= Rydal Dam =

- Location of the Rydal Dam in New South Wales
- Country: Australia
- Location: Central Tablelands, New South Wales
- Coordinates: 33°29′S 150°02′E
- Purpose: Industrial
- Status: Operational
- Construction began: 1956
- Opening date: 1957
- Owner: State Water Corporation

Dam and spillways
- Type of dam: Embankment dam
- Impounds: Off stream storage
- Height: 16 metres (52 ft)
- Length: 460 metres (1,510 ft)
- Spillways: 1
- Spillway type: Fuse plug uncontrolled open channel
- Spillway capacity: 75 cubic metres per second (2,600 cu ft/s)

Reservoir
- Total capacity: 370 megalitres (13×10^{6} cu ft)
- Catchment area: 1.5 square kilometres (0.58 sq mi)
- Surface area: 7 hectares (17 acres)
- Normal elevation: 971 metres (3,186 ft) AHD
- Website; Rydal Dam at www.statewater.com.au

Rydal Dam is a minor ungated homogeneous earthfill embankment dam with a fuse plug uncontrolled open channel spillway across an off stream storage, located near Rydal in the Central Tablelands region of New South Wales, Australia. The dam's purpose is to provide water storage for Delta power stations at Wallerawang and Mount Piper. The impounded reservoir is also called the Rydal Dam.

== Location and features ==
Commenced in 1956, completed in 1957, and upgraded in 1989 and 1996, the Rydal Dam is a minor ungated dam, located approximately 2 kilometres (1.2 mi) north of Rydal, 22 kilometres (14 mi) south-west of Lithgow. The dam was built by WV Hall and Elliott on behalf of the New South Wales Department of Land and Water Conservation for industrial purposes.

Water from the Rydal Dam feeds the Fish River Water Supply, which is a unique regional water supply scheme and is the only scheme in eastern Australia to transfer western flowing water east of the Great Dividing Range. In addition to Rydal Dam, the scheme comprises Oberon Dam, a weir on the Duckmaloi River, a water treatment plant, and extensive pipeline network supplying water to Oberon, Portland, Mount Piper Power Station, Wallerawang town, Wallerawang Power Station, Lithgow and the Upper Blue Mountains. Lake Lyell and Lake Wallace, although officially not part of the scheme, also provide water storage for Wallerawang and Mount Piper power stations.

The dam wall, constructed with earthfill, is 16 metres (52 ft) high and 460 metres (1,510 ft) long. The maximum water depth is 10 metres (33 ft) and at 100% capacity the dam wall holds back 370 megalitres (13×10^{6} cu ft) of water at an elevation of approximately 971 metres (3,186 ft) AHD. The surface area of the reservoir is 7 hectares (17 acres) and the catchment area is 1.5 square kilometres (0.58 sq mi). The uncontrolled open channel spillway with fuse plug is capable of discharging 75 cubic metres per second (2,600 cu ft/s).

== See also ==
- Delta Electricity
- Fish River
- Lake Lyell
- List of dams and reservoirs in New South Wales
- Mount Piper Power Station
- Oberon Dam
- Wallerawang Power Station
