= EnergyAustralia =

Australian energy company

- Type: Subsidiary
- Industry: Energy
- Founded: 1995; 31 years ago
- Headquarters: Melbourne, Victoria, Australia
- Key people: Mark Collette (MD)
- Services: Electricity and natural gas retail, solar and batteries
- Revenue: 6,889,300,000 Australian dollar
- Number of employees: 2,300
- Parent: CLP Group
- Website: www.energyaustralia.com.au

EnergyAustralia (formerly TRUenergy) is an electricity generation, electricity and gas retailing private company in Australia. It is one of the "big three" retailers in the National Electricity Market. It generates electricity primarily using coal fired generation, at the Yallourn Power Station in Victoria, and the Mount Piper Power Station in New South Wales. 10% of its generation is from wind power, 32% from gas, and 58% from coal. It is Australia's second biggest emitter of greenhouse gases, after AGL Energy. As a loss making company in 2023, its parent in Hong Kong, CLP Group, has stated that it is looking for partners for renewable energy investment, however as of this time, there were no plans to build new renewable energy itself.

It has committed to closing Yallourn Power Station in 2028, but plans to keep Mount Piper Power Station running until 2040.

Over 400,000 customers have opted in to EnergyAustralia's "carbon neutral" product, offered at no additional cost, however this product has led to legal accusations of "greenwashing".

== History ==
In 2005, TXU Corp sold all its Australian assets to Singapore Power, which retained the distribution businesses (electricity and natural gas distribution networks) in Victoria, and onsold the retail and generation businesses to the Hong Kong–based CLP Group, which also owned the Yallourn Power Station, in Victoria's Latrobe Valley. In Australia, CLP traded as TRUenergy, and became the fifth largest energy retailer in Australia. In 2011, TRUenergy acquired from the New South Wales Government the state's electricity retail business and trade name of EnergyAustralia. Following the sale of the government's electricity retail assets, the government changed the name of the remainder of the government enterprise to Ausgrid, and in 2012 TRUenergy changed its name to EnergyAustralia.

In 2013, EnergyAustralia acquired Wallerawang Power Station, now closed, along with Mount Piper Power Station, both in New South Wales, from Delta Electricity for A$160 million.

In 2015, EnergyAustralia closed its call centre in Melbourne, outsourcing up to 300 jobs to the Philippines.

In 2018, EnergyAustralia became one of the 17 energy businesses who supported the launch of the Energy Charter, a global initiative aimed at bringing together all parts of the power supply chain to give customers more affordable and reliable energy.

In 2021, EnergyAustralia announced that it will close the Yallourn Power Station in mid-2028, four years ahead of schedule, and instead build a 350-megawatt power-generating battery in the Latrobe Valley by the end of 2026. At the time, Yallourn produced about 20% of Victoria's electricity.

== Operations ==
EnergyAustralia supplies electricity and natural gas to more than 1.7 million residential and business customers throughout Australia.

In 2021 to 2022, it emitted 16.2 million tonnes of carbon dioxide, making it Australia's second largest emitter.

As of July 2017, EnergyAustralia has a master hedge agreement with Ecogen Energy for Ecogen to supply to it the output from Ecogen's gas-fired Newport and Jeeralang Power Stations, both in Victoria, which have a combined capacity of 960 megawatts (1,290,000 hp). EnergyAustralia also owns the gas-fired Hallett Power Station in South Australia with a capacity of 200 megawatts (270,000 hp).EnergyAusteralia operates in Queensland,Victoria,South Australia,and New South Wales as reported by moveinconnect.

In addition to the retail function, EnergyAustralia has a significant portfolio of industrial and commercial customers, and a A$5 billion portfolio of energy assets, including Hallett Power Station, Wallerawang Power Station (now decommissioned), and Mount Piper Power Station. It owned an underground natural gas storage facility at the Iona Gas Plant near Port Campbell until 2015.

In September 2023, the ACCC, the competition regulator, commenced legal action in regard to EnergyAustralia allegedly not complying with industry regulations around transparency in pricing, in 2022. EnergyAustralia may face millions of dollars of fines in regard to this.

== Carbon neutral electricity ==
EnergyAustralia offers a carbon neutral electricity option to their customers by purchasing carbon offset units from a range of Australian and international offset projects including renewable energy projects in developing countries, land management and tree planting in Australia. It is certified by Climate Active, the Australian government's certification product.

However, it does not commence until 6 months after an accounts connection date, and if the account number changes, the six month counter restarts. This is not clearly advertised, however it is in their terms and conditions.

In relation to this product, in August 2023, a lawsuit was filed in the Federal Court of Australia, accusing EnergyAustralia of greenwashing, aiming to bar them from making deceptive claims about their product in the future. EnergyAustralia stated that their product complied with the federal government's Climate Active certification product. However, a 2022 Australia Institute report heavily criticised this certification product, alleging that it was "state sponsored greenwashing."

According to Michael Mazengarb, a consultant in renewable energy and climate change policy, EnergyAustralia is by far the largest buyer of offsets under the Climate Active certification. It is able to afford to offer this product at no additional cost to its customers, because "the offsets are so cheap".

== Energy generation and assets ==
EnergyAustralia's portfolio of assets includes:

- Mount Piper Power Station, New South Wales
- Tallawarra Power Station, New South Wales
- Wallerawang Power Station, New South Wales (decommissioned)
- Pine Dale Mine, New South Wales
- Yallourn Power Station, Victoria
- Cathedral Rocks Wind Farm, South Australia
- Hallett Power Station, South Australia
- Waterloo Wind Farm, South Australia
