= Wallerawang Power Station =

Decommissioned thermal coal power station near Wallerawang, Australia

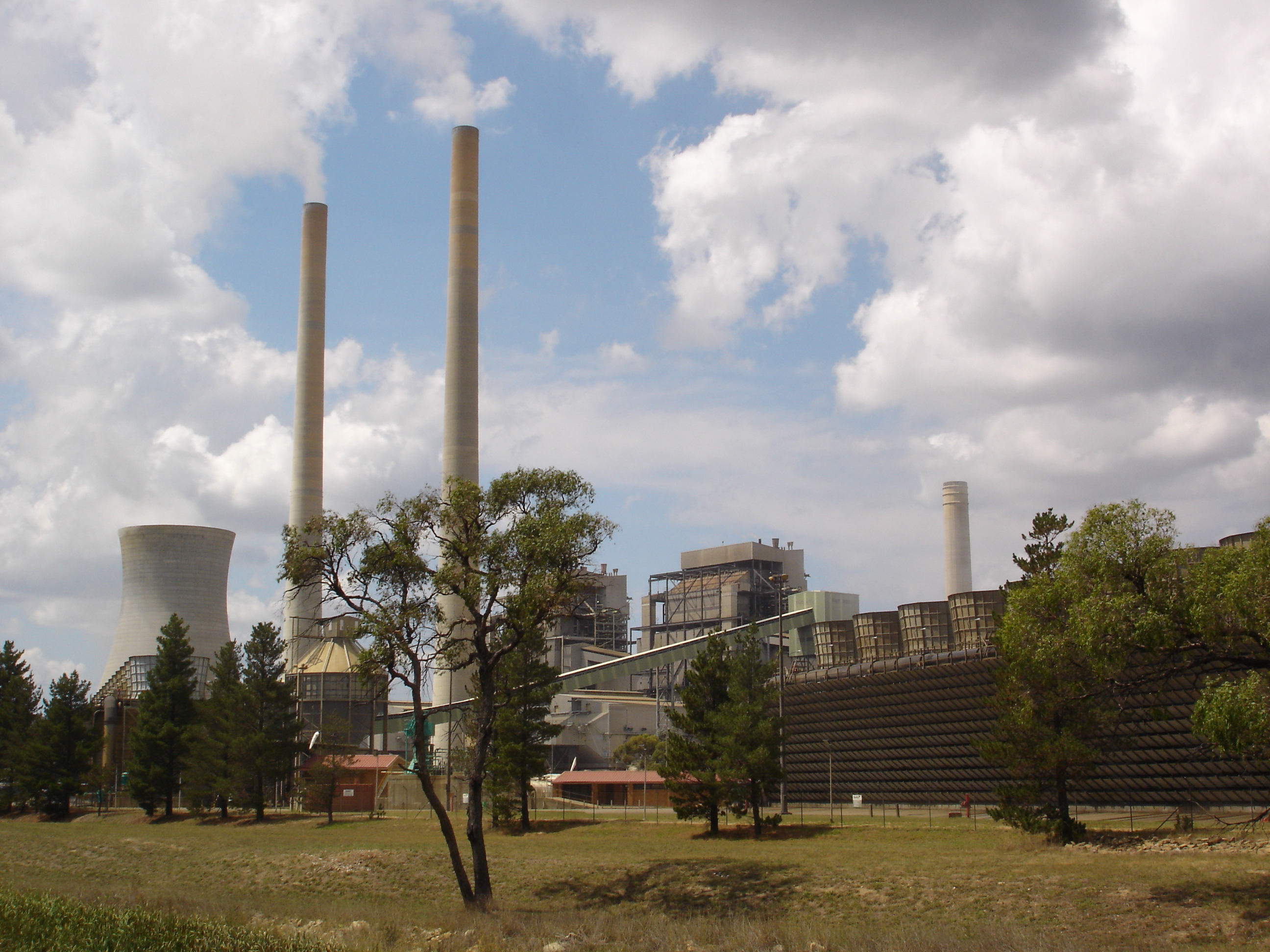
- Wallerawang Power Station in 2007
- Country: Australia
- Location: Wallerawang, New South Wales
- Coordinates: 33°24′14″S 150°5′4″E
- Status: Decommissioned
- Commission date: May 1957; 69 years ago (A); 1961; 65 years ago (B); 1976; 50 years ago (C)
- Decommission date: January 2013; 13 years ago (A); April 2014; 12 years ago (B); November 2014; 12 years ago (C)
- Owner: EnergyAustralia

Thermal power station
- Primary fuel: Thermal coal

Power generation
- Units operational: 2
- Make and model: CA Parsons & Company
- Nameplate capacity: 1,000 megawatts (1,300,000 hp)

External links
- Website: Mt Piper & Wallerawang Power Stations at www.energyaustralia.com.au
- Commons: Related media on Commons

Wallerawang Power Station was a thermal coal power station, located near Wallerawang, in the Central Tablelands region of New South Wales, Australia. The power station was equipped with two turbo-alternators of 500 megawatts (670,000 hp) each, supplied by CA Parsons & Company of Newcastle-upon-Tyne, England. Production commenced in May 1957.

In July 2013, EnergyAustralia acquired Wallerawang Power Station, along with Mount Piper Power Station, from Delta Electricity for $160 million. Due to dwindling demand, the first of the two generating units had been mothballed in January 2013, and the second in April 2014. In November 2014, EnergyAustralia announced that it would permanently close Wallerawang due to ongoing reduced energy demand, lack of access to competitively priced coal and the power station's high operating costs. EnergyAustralia began the process of removing useful equipment from the station in 2015. The plant was finally demolished in 2021 using controlled demolition.

== Features and capacity ==
Wallerawang A – originally built with four British Thomson-Houston 30 megawatts (40,000 hp) single cylinder generators, completed in 1957–1959. Steam was supplied to each generator by a John Thompson Etaflow boiler at a rate of 150,000 kilograms per hour (330,000 lb/h) at 600 pounds per square inch (4,100 kPa) and 540 °F (282 °C). Wallerawang A was decommissioned in May 1986.

Wallerawang B – comprised two General Electric 60 megawatts (80,000 hp) 2–cylinder turbines with hydrogen cooled generators completed in 1961. Steam was supplied to each generator by a John Thompson boiler at a rate of 270,000 kilograms per hour (600,000 lb/h) at 900 pounds per square inch (6,200 kPa) and 900 °F (482 °C). Wallerawang B was decommissioned in 1990.

Wallerawang C — comprised two 500 megawatts (670,000 hp) units were completed in 1976 and 1980. Due to dwindling energy demand, in January 2013 the NSW government-owned corporation, Delta Electricity, mothballed one of the two remaining units of Wallerawang C for twelve months. The other was also mothballed 15 months later.

The coal for Wallerawang Power Station came from mines in the local area, delivered by private road. 75% of the coal comes from the Centennial Coal owned Angus Place colliery.

Wallerawang Power Station drew its cooling water from Lake Wallace and Thompson's Creek dam, fresh water lakes on the Coxs River. Water from Lake Lyell and mine dewatering projects can also supply water in times of shortage. In 2007 and in 2009, water shortages occurred in the Fish River system, causing concern that the generating facility would be forced to close. Oberon Shire was also concerned about the level of potable water available from the Oberon Dam, a water cooling source for Wallerawang Power Station.

Lake Lyell is proposed for a 385 MW / 3.08 GWh pumped hydro project.

== Pollutants ==
A report from Carbon Monitoring for Action estimated that the Wallerawang Power Station emitted approximately 6,500,000 tonnes (6,400,000 long tons) of CO_{2} each year as a result of burning coal. The Rudd government announced the introduction of a Carbon Pollution Reduction Scheme to help combat climate change that was expected to commence in 2010, however a bill to introduce the cap and trade system was defeated on the floor of the Parliament. The subsequent Australian Renewable Energy Agency Bill, 2011 (Cth) was enacted and established an emissions trading scheme to price carbon in Australia in a regulated manner between from 2012 to June 2015. The carbon pricing scheme was discontinued by new federal government officials in 2014. It was expected that these measures would have impacted on emissions from power stations.

Wallerawang Power Station has emitted the following selected list of pollutants:

Pollutant identified	Levels of pollutant			Location(s) of pollutant
Pollutant identified	2011–2012		2010–2011	Location(s) of pollutant
Ammonia	▲	740 kilograms (1,630 lb)	520 kilograms (1,150 lb)	Air
Ammonia	▼	6,900 kilograms (15,200 lb)	8,600 kilograms (19,000 lb)	Water
Carbon monoxide	▼	660,000 kilograms (1,460,000 lb)	470,000 kilograms (1,040,000 lb)	Air
Chlorine and compounds	▼	680 kilograms (1,500 lb)	1,600 kilograms (3,500 lb)	Air
Chlorine and compounds	▲	1,900 kilograms (4,200 lb)	1,200 kilograms (2,600 lb)	Water
Hydrochloric acid	▲	1,600,000 kilograms (3,500,000 lb)	1,100,000 kilograms (2,400,000 lb)	Air
Lead and compounds	▼	46 kilograms (101 lb)	110 kilograms (240 lb)	Air
Mercury and compounds	▲	12 kilograms (26 lb)	6 kilograms (13 lb)	Air
Oxides of Nitrogen	▲	16,000,000 kilograms (35,000,000 lb)	11,000,000 kilograms (24,000,000 lb)	Air
Sulfuric acid	▼	310,000 kilograms (680,000 lb)	210,000 kilograms (460,000 lb)	Air
Zinc and compounds	▲	320 kilograms (710 lb)	220 kilograms (490 lb)	Air

== See also ==
- Mount Piper Power Station
- Rydal Dam
