= Oberon Dam =

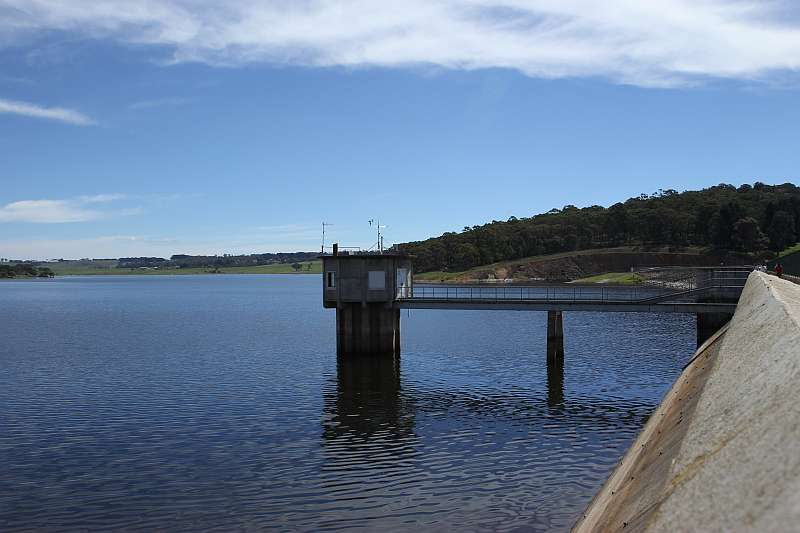
- Oberon Dam wall and reservoir, with fuse plug spillway in top right

- Location of the Oberon Dam in New South Wales
- Country: Australia
- Location: Central Tablelands, New South Wales
- Coordinates: 33°43′S 149°52′E
- Status: Operational
- Construction began: 1943
- Opening date: 1959
- Owner: State Water Corporation

Dam and spillways
- Type of dam: Embankment dam
- Impounds: Fish River
- Height: 34 metres (112 ft)
- Length: 378 metres (1,240 ft)
- Spillways: 2
- Spillway type: Ungated concrete ski jump chute spillway with fuse plug
- Spillway capacity: 280 cubic metres per second (9,900 cu ft/s)

Reservoir
- Creates: Lake Oberon
- Total capacity: 45,420 megalitres (1,604×10^{6} cu ft)
- Catchment area: 140 square kilometres (54 sq mi)
- Surface area: 410 hectares (1,000 acres)
- Maximum water depth: 30 metres (98 ft)
- Normal elevation: 1,068 metres (3,504 ft) AHD
- Website; Oberon Dam at www.statewater.com.au

Oberon Dam or Fish River Dam is a major ungated concrete slab and buttress with earth embankment dam comprising a concrete ski jump chute spillway and fuse plug across the Fish River upstream of Oberon in the Central Tablelands region of New South Wales, Australia. The dam's purpose includes flood mitigation, industrial, and water supply. The impounded reservoir is called Lake Oberon.

== Location and features ==
Commenced in 1943, completed over two stages in 1959, and upgraded in 1996, the Oberon Dam is a major dam on the Fish River (formerly, Fish River Creek), located approximately 3 kilometres (1.9 mi) upstream, south-east of Oberon. The dam was built by the NSW Department of Public Works on behalf of the New South Wales Department of Land and Water Conservation. The original intent of the works was to supply water to the National Oil Proprietary Ltd's refinery at Glen Davis in the western coal fields, factories at Lithgow, and supporting populations. Water from Oberon Dam feeds the Fish River Water Supply, which is a unique regional water supply scheme and is the only scheme in eastern Australia to transfer western flowing water to areas east of the Great Dividing Range.

The dam wall is 35 metres (115 ft) high and the buttress is 232 metres (761 ft) long, and the embankment a further 167 metres (548 ft) long. The maximum water depth is 30 metres (98 ft) and at 100% capacity the dam wall holds back 45,420 megalitres (1,604×10^{6} cu ft) of water at 1,068 metres (3,504 ft) AHD. The surface area of Lake Oberon is 410 hectares (1,000 acres) and the catchment area is 140 square kilometres (54 sq mi). The concrete ski jump chute and fuse plug spillways are capable of discharging 280 cubic metres per second (9,900 cu ft/s).

Oberon Dam provides a bulk water supply to Oberon Shire, Lithgow City Council and Sydney Catchment Authority as well as to the power stations owned and operated by EnergyAustralia.

== Recreation ==
The reservoir is regularly stocked with brown and rainbow trout and can be fished throughout the year from the water's edge. On the reservoir's northern shore toilets and picnic facilities are available.

== See also ==
- List of dams and reservoirs in New South Wales
