= Glen Davis Shale Oil Works =

Oil extraction plant

The Glen Davis Shale Oil Works was a shale oil extraction plant, in the Capertee Valley, at Glen Davis, New South Wales, Australia, which operated from 1940 until 1952. It was the last oil-shale operation in Australia, until the Stuart Oil Shale Project in the late 1990s. For the period of 1865–1952, it provided one fifth of the shale oil produced in Australia.

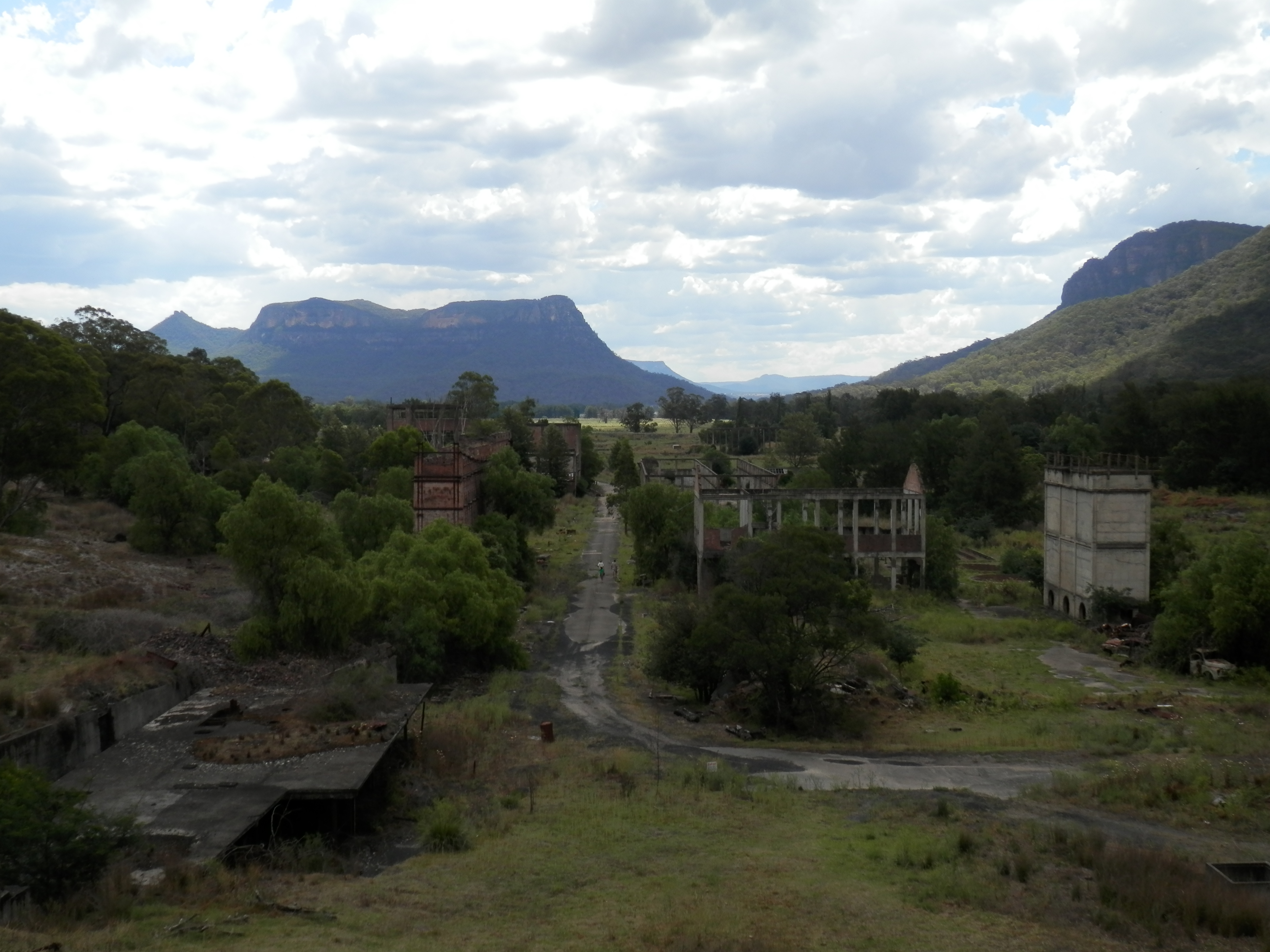
Ruins of Glen Davis Oil Shale Works, Nov 2014.

== History ==
The shale oil industry at Glen Davis was developed for production of shale oil for national defence purposes, although the basis of this project was the 1934 report of the Newnes Investigation Committee, which looked at ways to decrease the number of unemployed miners in the region. A public notice in the Commonwealth of Australia Gazette, on 28 May 1936, invited offers for developing the oil industry in the Glen Davis area.

National Oil Proprietary Limited was created—with capital of £500,000—as a special purpose vehicle, by George Francis Davis of Davis Gelatine, to build and operate the new oil shale operation. This company received financial support from the Commonwealth of Australia and New South Wales governments. Davis contributed £166,000 and Commonwealth Government £344,000 (together the capital of £500,000), and the New South Wales Government provided £166,000 secured by debentures.

Glen Davis was chosen as the site, in preference to the old works site at Newnes, due to the high cost of rehabilitating the old Wolgan Valley railway and because mining conditions were considered to be better at Glen Davis. However, Glen Davis had its own disadvantages.

Construction of the shale oil works started in 1938 and the plant was commissioned in 1939, with operations starting on 3 January 1940. More capital was required from shareholders in April 1940 and again in November 1940, and the Commonwealth Government provided another £225,000 in the form of a loan. It became apparent that the estimate of cost provided in the Newnes Investigation Committee's report was inadequate, as the total expenditure on the plant reached £1,300,000.

The incoming Curtin government was not satisfied with assurances that its investment was safe. George Davis was knighted in 1941, for his contribution to the war effort, but the Commonwealth Government took over the board and appointed new management in December 1941. Sir George Davis remained chairman of the board but was no longer joint Managing Director, and the board was now dominated by government nominees. Davis resigned from the board in October 1942. The government would buy out the private shareholders in 1949.

During World War II, shale oil produced by the Glen Davis Shale Oil Works was considered to be a strategic resource. In 1941, 4,273,315 imperial gallons (19,426,870 L; 5,132,037 US gal) of shale oil were produced.

In 1942, a visiting party from the US Board of Economic Warfare recommended that the plant be expanded using Renco (or NTU) retorts, and an order was placed to supply these from the US but that order was later cancelled. A Renco retort, which had been successfully tested by Standard Oil of Australia at Newcastle using Baemari oil shale, was transported to Glen Davis, in 1942, but not used there. During the calendar years 1943 to 1945 inclusive, the Glen Davis plant refined around 2,000,000 gallons of crude shale oil that had been produced from the mines and NTU retorts of Lithgow Oil Proprietary Ltd, at Marangaroo, near Lithgow. Despite expert opinion and the apparent success of NTU retorts at Marangaroo, Glen Davis remained committed to its 'modified Pumpherston' or 'Fell' retort design. That commitment to retort design was likely based on advice given to George Davis by John Fell, who had run the Newnes oil extraction operations from 1914 to 1923, but the failure to even try the Renco retort, which had been relocated at great cost, remains one of the mysteries of the Glen Davis operation.

After expansion of the Glen Davis plant in 1946—to a nominal capacity of 10,000,000 imperial gallons (45,000,000 L; 12,000,000 US gal) of petrol per year—a shortage of mined shale constrained its output. In 1947, the refinery section of the plant was only operating 70-days during the first half of that year; not enough crude shale oil was produced by the retorts, which were only processing about 400 short tons of shale per calendar day. Productivity was poor and the works' losses were only limited by a petrol excise rebate on the oil that it produced. Securing sufficient skilled labour was a problem, due to the isolated location of Glen Davis. The workforce was around 600.

There were plans to further expand the scale of mining, retorting and refining to double the capacity. However, in 1948, a report by Gordon Sellers of the Joint Coal Board revealed that the remaining shale reserves at Glen Davis were insufficient to support an expansion. Consequently, there would be no further capital investment from the government.

In December 1950, it was decided to close the operation. In 1951, the last full year before closure, it produced only 1,452,000 imperial gallons (6,600,000 L; 1,744,000 US gal) and in the year ending December 1950 it had lost £507,637—consisting of a trading loss of £206,078, depreciation of £124,903, and interest of £176,656—revenue from petrol sales was £263,156 but wages, salaries, stores and insurance costs were £501,951. Had the plant achieved even half of its design throughput in 1951, it would have been profitable but, by the end of 1950, the accumulated losses already totalled 84% of capital and advances. To the end, the continuing inability to mine sufficient shale to feed the retorts was the cause of the works' losses. Plans to change the method of mining from 'bord and pillar' to 'longwall' never eventuated.

Government funding ceased in 1952, and Glen Davis was closed on 30 May. Although some syndicates had interest in the facility, no deal was concluded. The closure caused a 'stay down' strike by miners and other workers kept the retorts running without being paid. The 'stay down' strike ended after 26 days, without success, when the Australian Council of Trade Unions decided not to support the strike.

The works had been the site of contention between communist-inspired and non-communist trade union leadership, particularly between the Miner's Federation—covering the mine workers—and the Australian Workers' Union—covering workers at the retorts and refinery. In 1948, the miners' union refused to allow Polish immigrants—eight of the men were experienced coal miners—to work in the shale mine but the same men were welcomed by the AWU. The miner's resistance to the Poles' working in the mine, seems to have been based on a perception of their political views rather than their ethnicity.

Many saw the rigorous enforcement of the 'darg'—a work quota—by communist-led miners, as the reason for the low production rate of oil shale in the highly mechanised shale mine—with claims that miners were working actively for as little as four hours in an eight-hour shift—that in turn being the cause of the works' eventual fate. Others denied even the existence of a 'darg' and of communist-led unions at Glen Davis, blaming instead the state of the mining equipment and the management for the closure. Others blamed the scale of operations and the choice of retort design as the cause of its demise.

The closure of the works loomed as a personal financial catastrophe for those who had built or bought houses on land in the township. The Commonwealth Government agreed to compensation that softened the blow, and the unions agreed to allow the industrial plant to be disassembled. Beginning in early 1953, much of the movable equipment and other salvageable items were put on sale at auction. The population soon drifted away—dwindling from around 2,000, at its peak, to only 195 by late 1954—and some buildings in the town were relocated, leaving Glen Davis close to a ghost town. The immovable parts of the plant became ruins.

Although the works had been intended as a means of securing local petrol production, it had provided only a tiny portion of annual petrol consumption in Australia, which by 1952 was 638-million imperial gallons per year. As early as 1944, it had been pointed out that the entire oil shale reserves of New South Wales were equivalent to only three months of Australia's peace-time oil consumption. In the end, the Glen Davis operation had only a very minor economic significance and would not be missed.

The site was used as a location for the 1980 Australian movie "The Chain Reaction" and as the base location for the 2021 reality television show SAS Australia.

== Deposits and resources ==
Two seams of oil shale were mined at Glen Davis. The main seam was torbanite and was mined between 5 and 2 feet in thickness. Lying immediately above the 'main seam' was a layer of white clay—6 inches to 2 feet thick—and above that a seam of semi-carbonaceous shale, the 'top' or 'secondary' seam.

When assayed, the shale from the richer 'main seam' averaged 50% oil—containing over 130 imperial gallons (590 L; 160 US gal) per long ton—while the 'top' or 'secondary' seam contained only 8.5% oil, or just over 20 imperial gallons per long ton. The mixed shale from both seams averaged 20% oil or about 50 imperial gallons (230 L; 60 US gal) per long ton. The deposit held a total of 2000-million imperial gallons of oil. Although the secondary seam shale reduced the average oil content in the mined shale, mining both seams together allowed mechanised mining methods to be used.

There was an independent coal mine nearby that supplied the works with the coal that it used as a fuel for its processes.

The rainfall at Glen Davis was 16 to 18 inches per year and, in dry times, surface water at Glen Davis was insufficient. Bores were put down but the water needed treatment. Water was a constraint on production in the early years. From March 1946, water was supplied to the works, from the Oberon Dam on the Fish River, by a 105 km long pipeline. This is a rare instance of water from the Murray-Darling catchment being diverted to a location that is east of the Great Dividing Range. In 1949, reticulated water was supplied to the township. Yet, during the heavy rains of June 1949, the works was affected by the flooding of the nearby Capertee River and there was more flooding during 1950.

== Description ==
The 55,000 acres (22,000 ha) mining and shale oil extraction complex was located in Gindantherie, Goolloinboin, Barton, Glen Alice, and Capertee parishes of Cook and Hunter counties.

The oil shale mine used bord-and-pillar mining techniques, and employed 170 miners. The mine was highly mechanised. The mined shale was brought out of the mine using electric locomotives hauling skips over a 3ft 6in narrow-gauge industrial tramway. The shale was crushed by a Pennsylvania single-roll type crusher and was then conveyed into the retorts.

The company originally planned to use two tunnel ovens, each with a daily capacity of 336 tons, designed by AS Franz Krull of Estonia and Lurgi AG of Germany, similar to those used by some oil shale industries in Estonia. However, for economic reasons, it was decided in March 1939 to instead use the retorts that had been employed in the closed Newnes Shale Oil Works; 64 modified Pumpherston retorts were transferred from Newnes. Crucially, the gas off-take arrangement of the Newnes retorts was not retained—causing initial problems when the Glen Davis plant started—and the retorts needed to be modified to use the older Newnes arrangement. Another 44 planned similar retorts were deferred until this problem was resolved. The 44 retorts were added in 1946.

Retorts were initially heated by coal, obtained from a nearby coal mine, before the retort reached a temperature at which its operation was self-sustaining. The rate of recovery of the retorts was 82% of the assayed oil content as crude oil. The crude shale oil was refined to make petrol, with the crude oil yielding a little over 50% petrol.

The petrol was pumped, under high pressure, through a 32-mile (51 km) long pipeline to storage tanks at Newnes Junction, from where it was transported by rail. There were two storage tanks at Newnes Junction, each with a capacity or 500,000 gallons. The pipeline was made of 3-inch diameter steel pipe.

The first part of the pipeline was laid through chasms and across a saddle between the works and the Wolgan Valley. The next section of the pipeline, in part, followed the former route of the Wolgan Valley Railway but deviated from that route—following parts of the modern-day Pagoda Track and the Old Coach Road—to shorten its length. It was supported on pipe support and bridge structures made, at least in part, from old bullhead rails from the disused railway. The long exposed pipeline would prove a tempting target for criminals; despite the obvious danger involved, there were at least three separate attempts to drill into overland pipeline and steal petrol, during the time that petrol was rationed. The pipeline was also vulnerable during bushfires.

It was intended originally to construct another—gravity fed—pipeline from Newnes Junction to Blacktown, where National Oil Proprietary Ltd. had land for a distribution centre, but this section of the pipeline was never built.

The works had its own brickworks and power station.

== Gallery ==
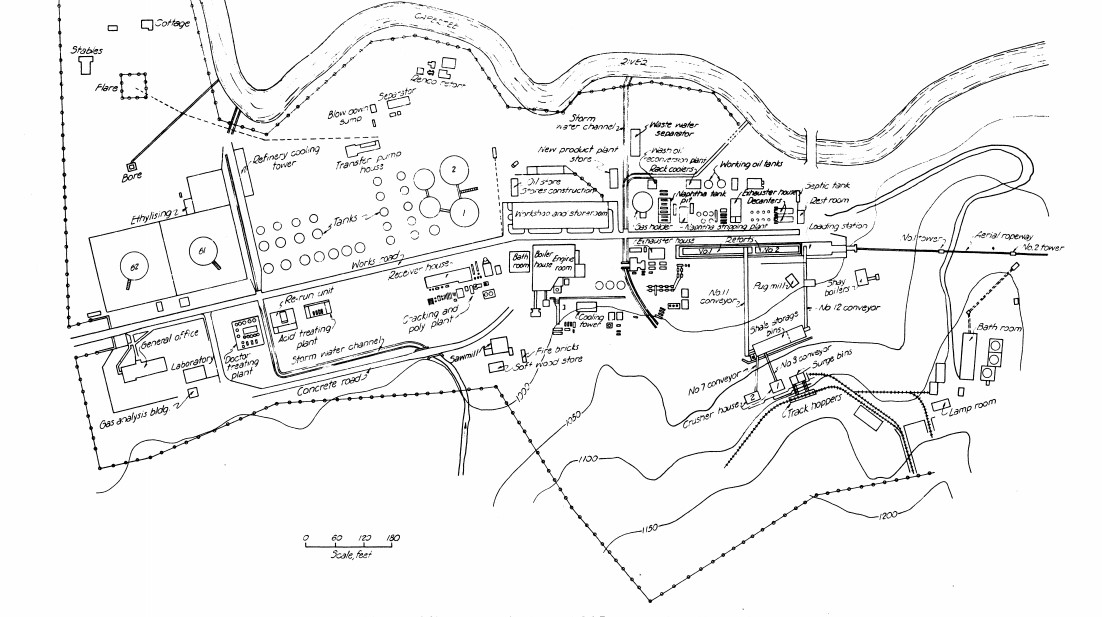
General layout of the works.

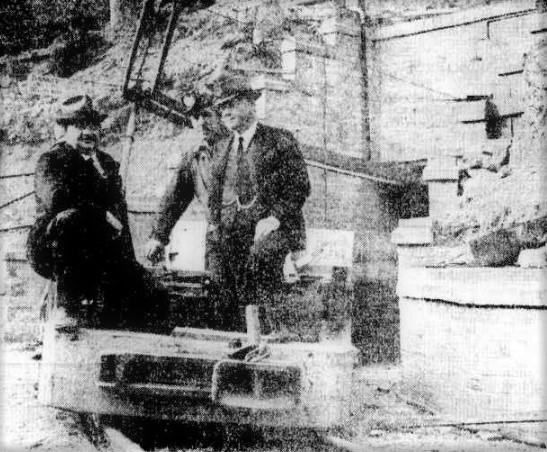
Sir George Davis (left) and Premier Mair (right, visiting Glen Davis in July 1940) aboard an electric locomotive, with mine adit at rear.

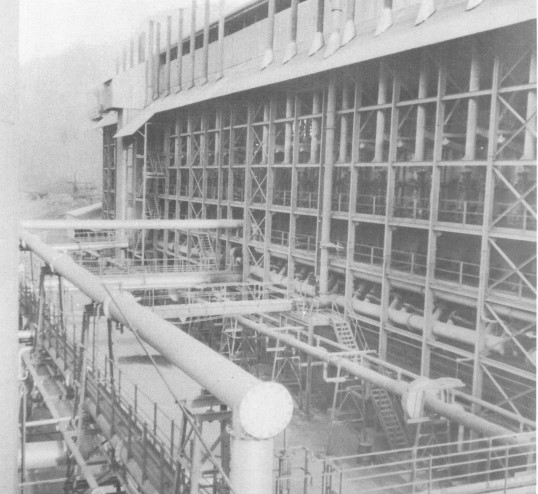
Retorts c.1947.

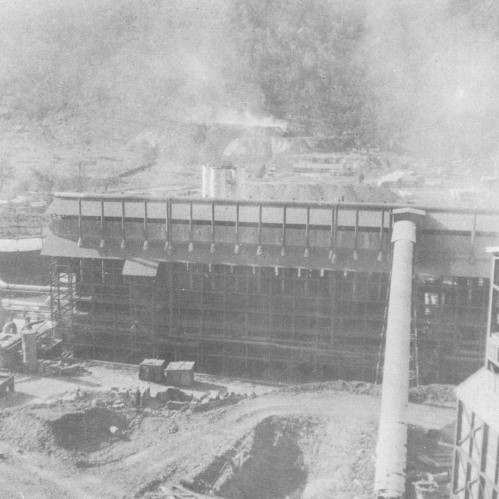
Retorts and shale conveyor from storage bins c.1947.

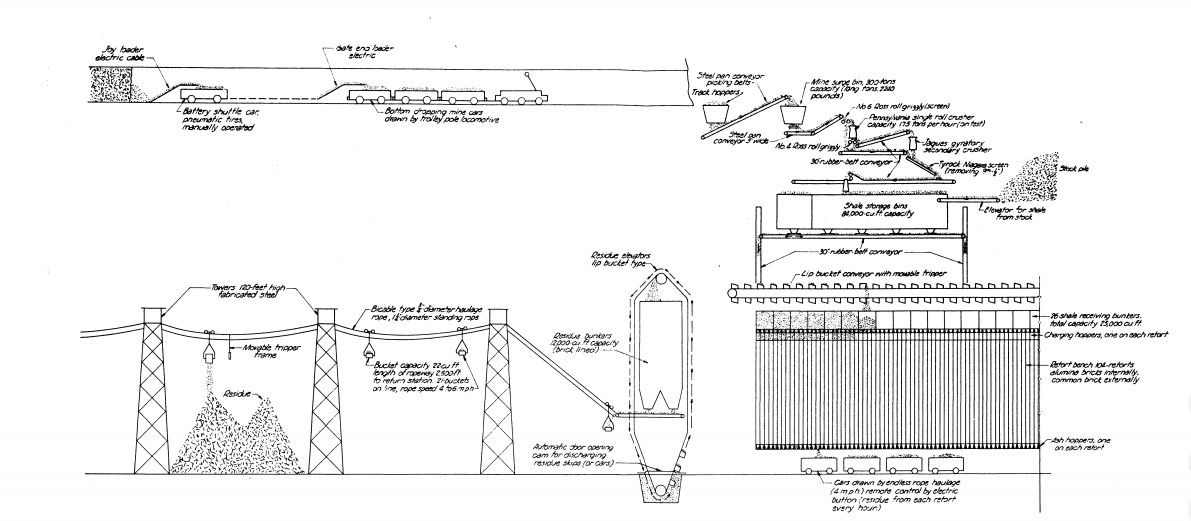
Diagram of process flow of oil shale from mine to waste dump.

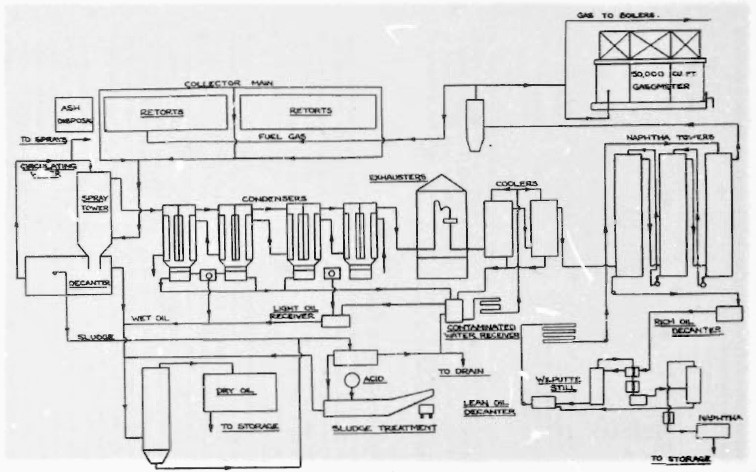
Diagram of process flow from retort gas off-take to Condensing Plant and Naphtha Plant.

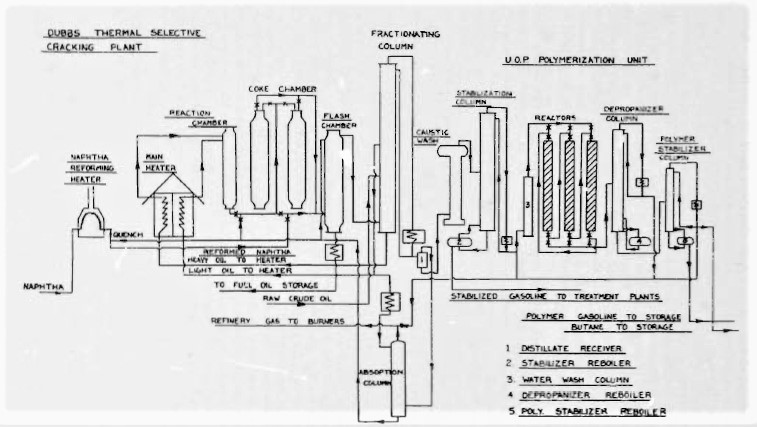
Diagram of process flow for Cracking and Polymerization Plant

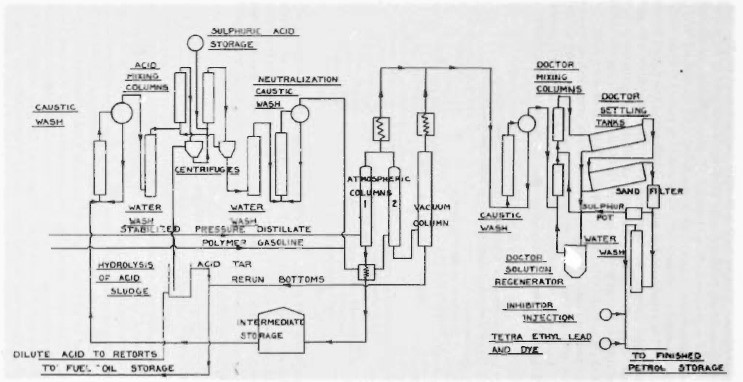
Diagram of process flow for (Final) Treatment Plant

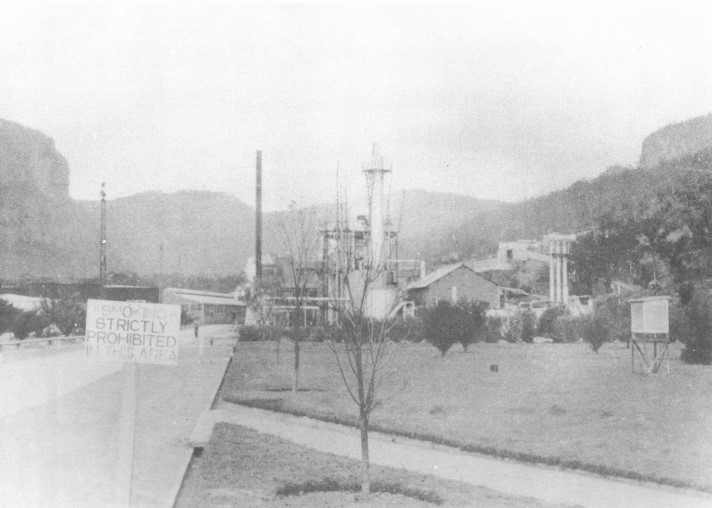
View with refinery in the background c.1947.

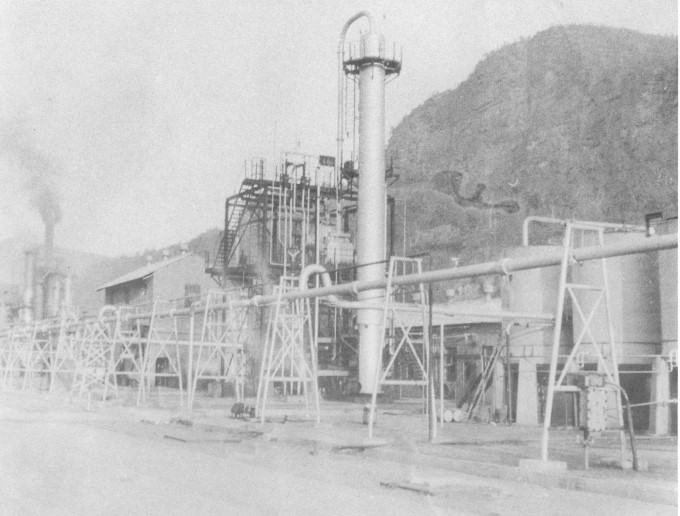
Refinery c.1947.

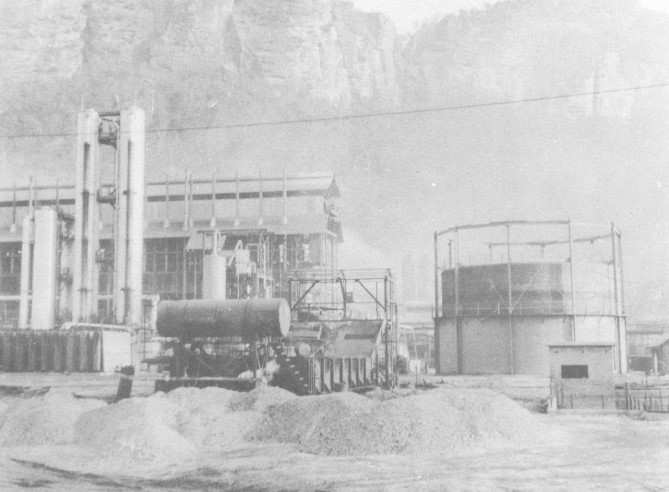
Naphtha plant c.1947.

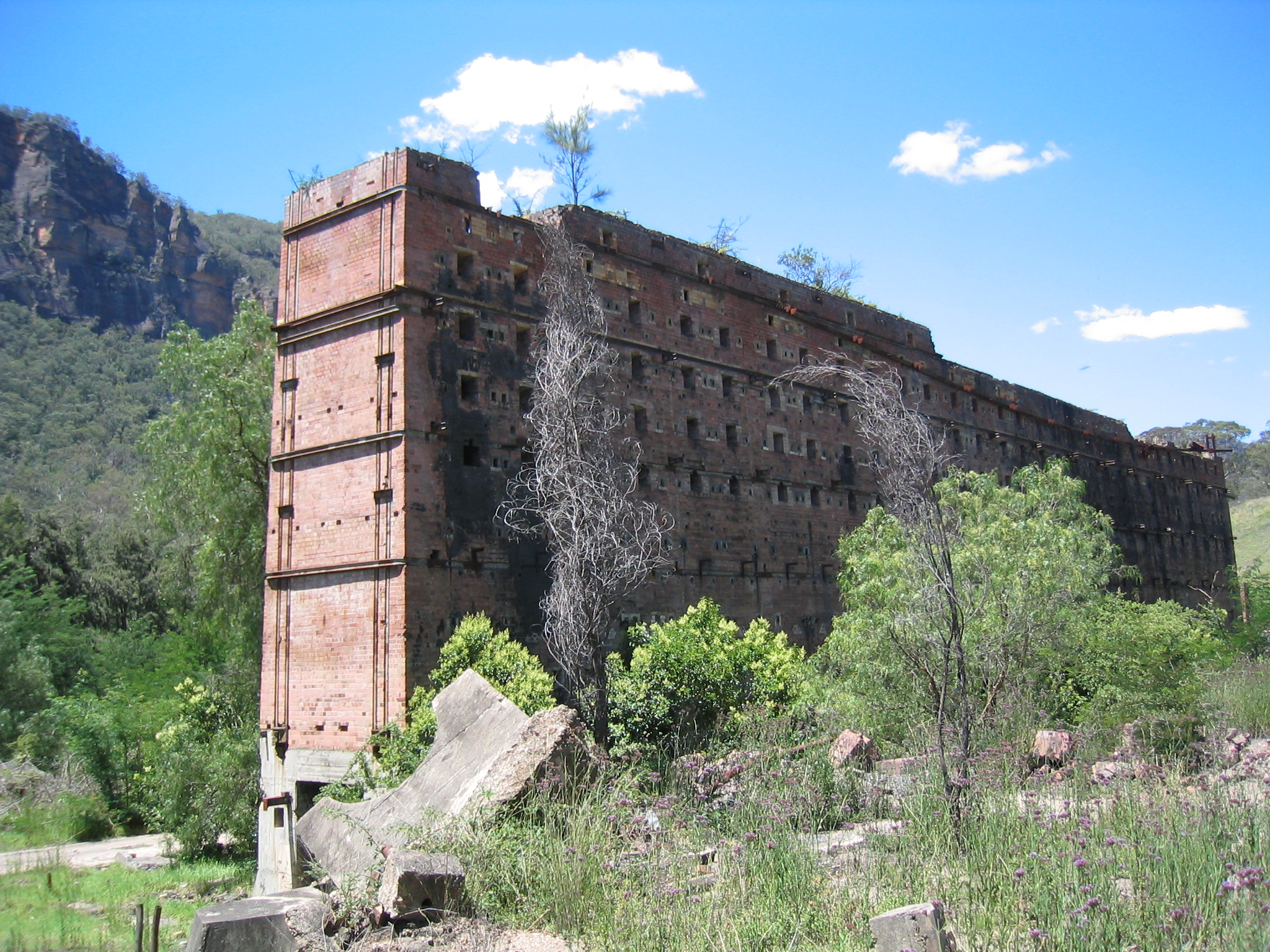
Ruins of the retorts (Jan. 2005)

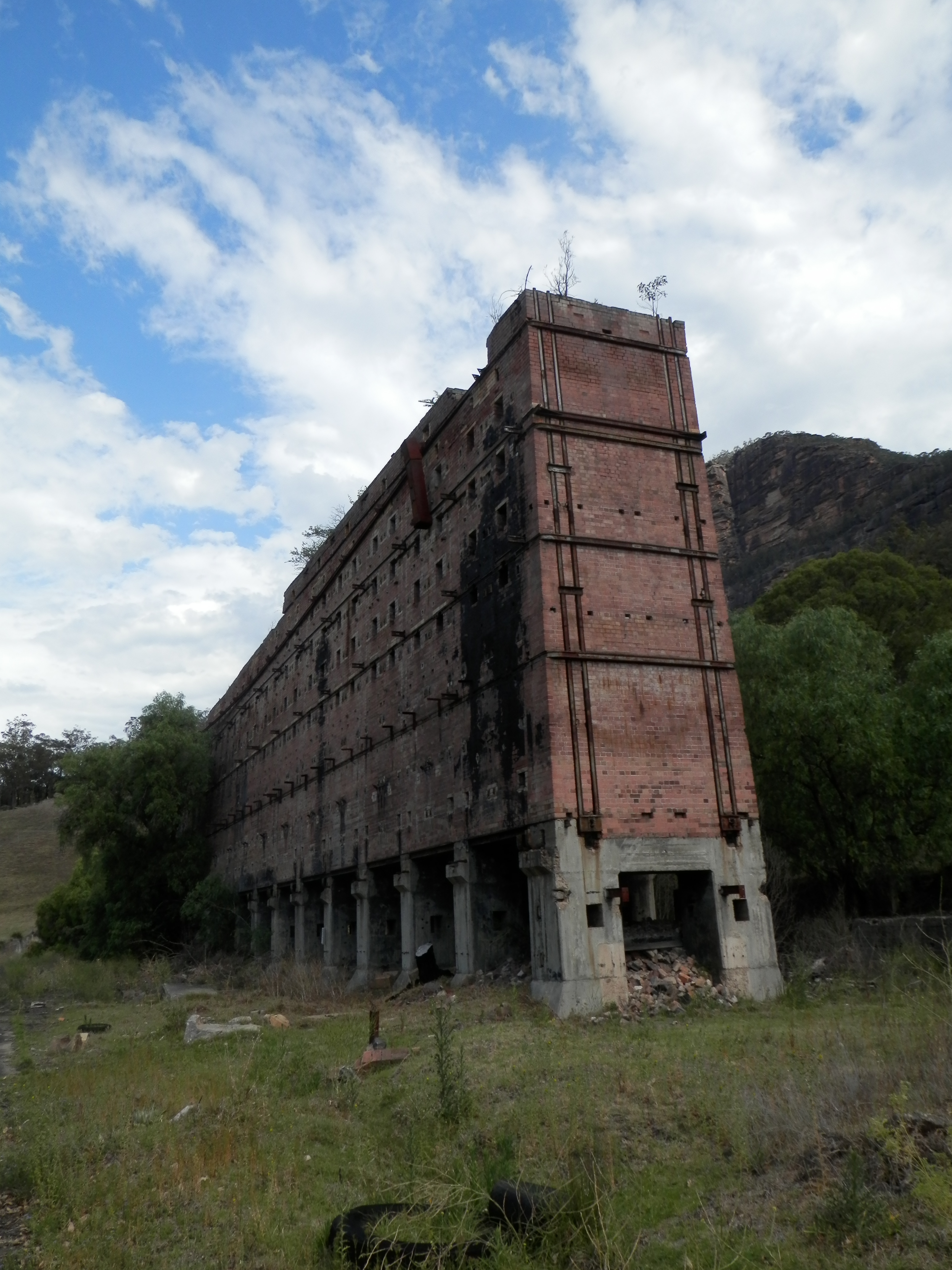
Ruins of the retorts in November 2014.

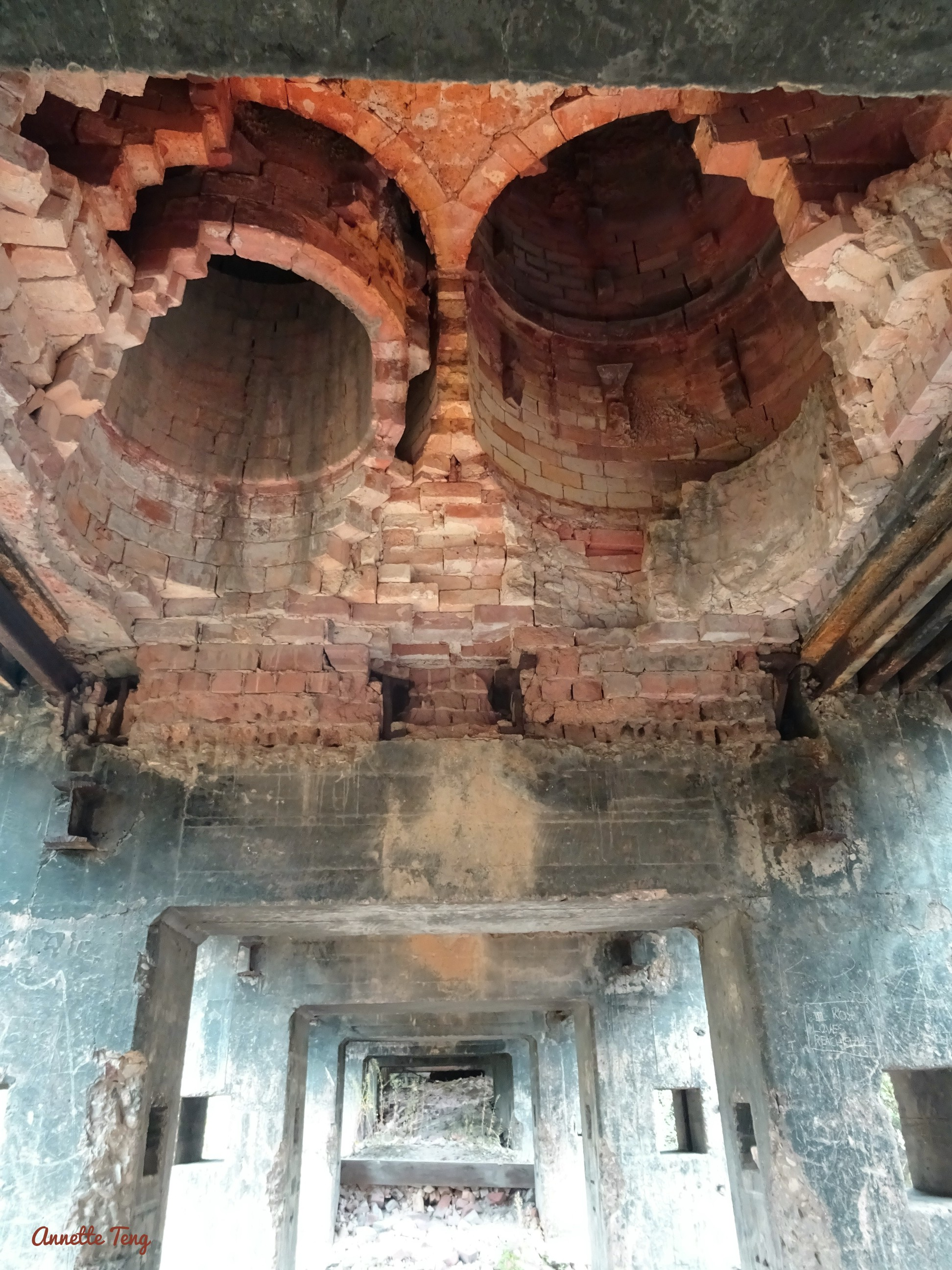
Underside of the ruin of the retorts.

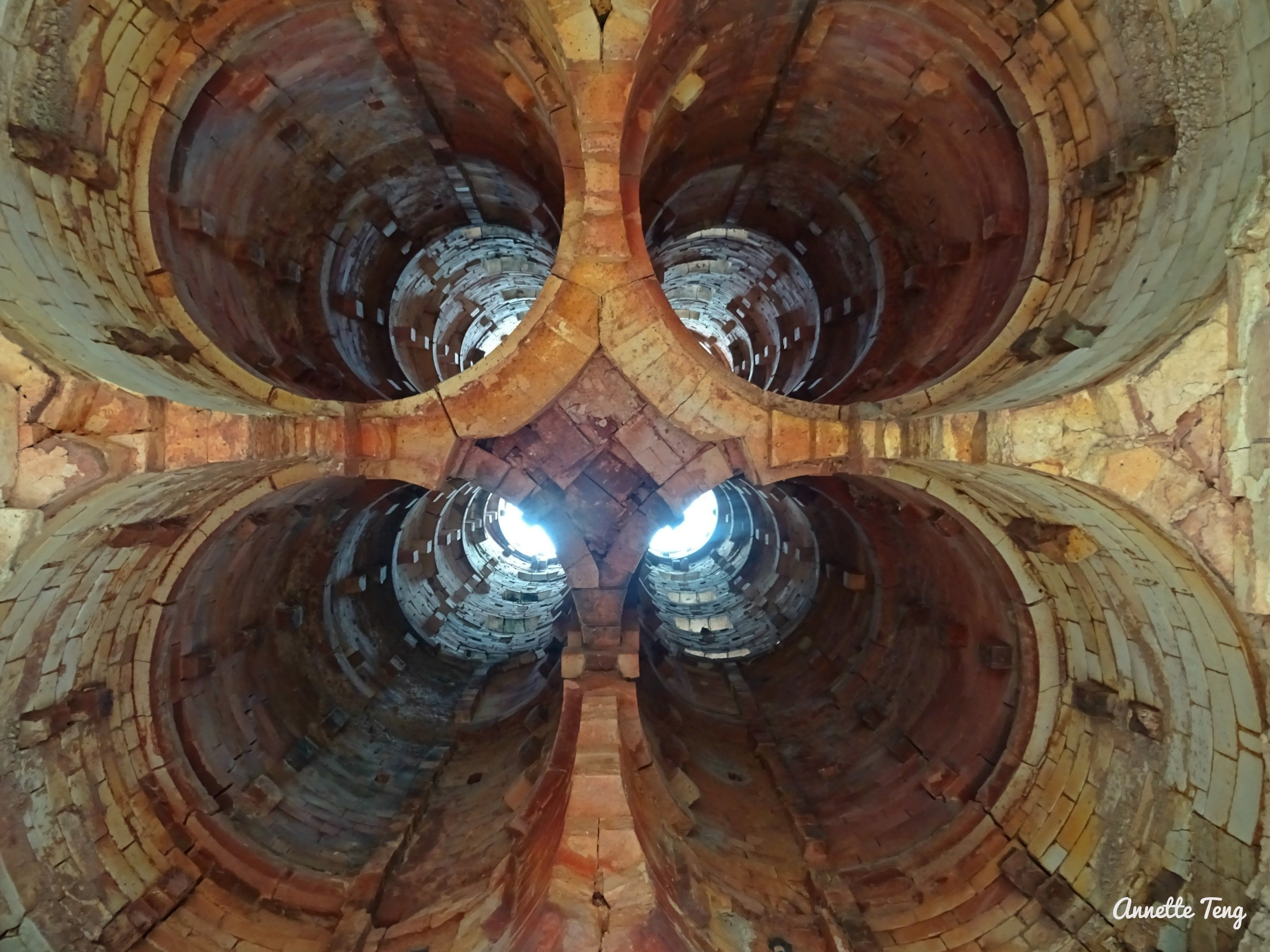
Upward view through ruined retort structure

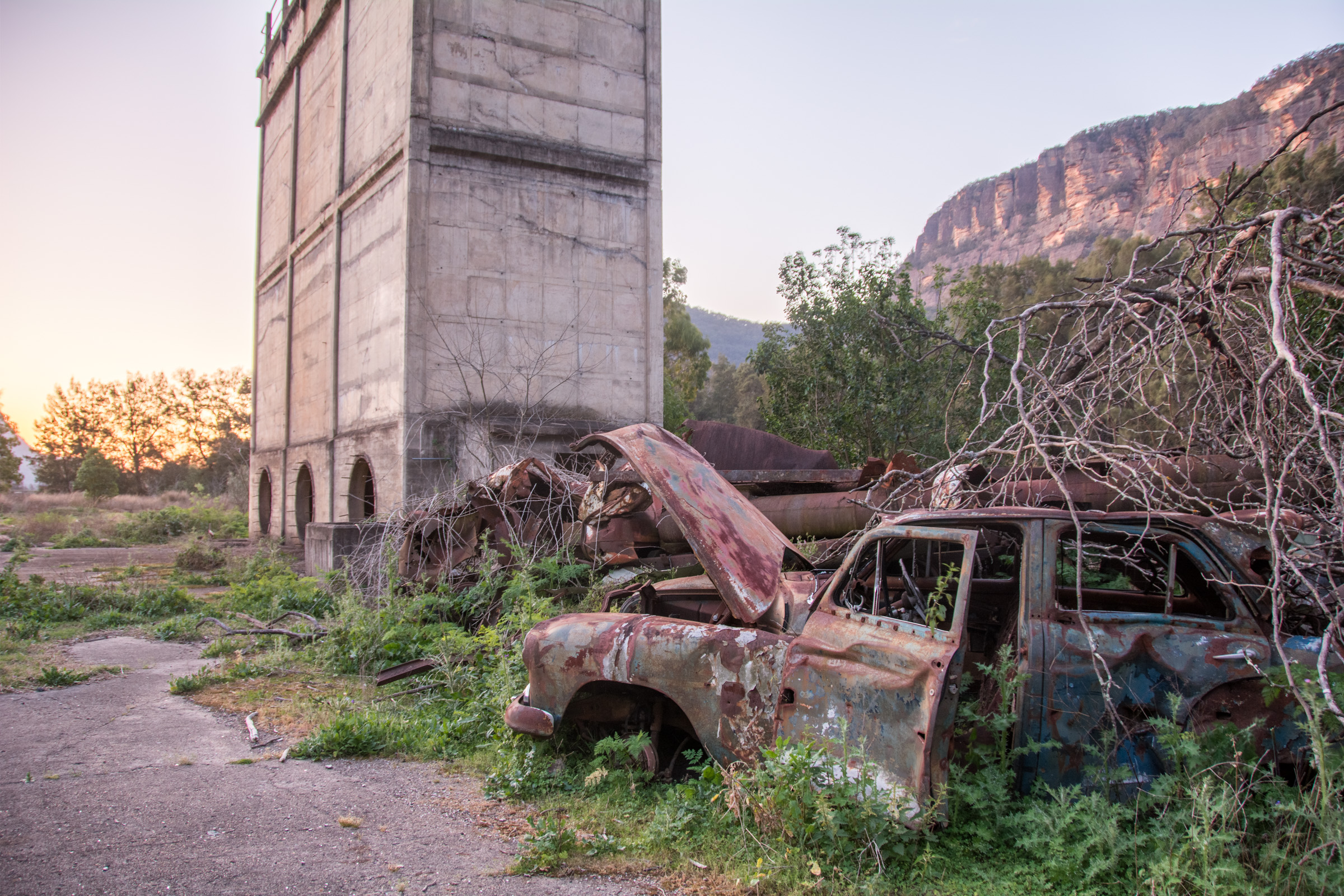
Ruins of the primary cooler.

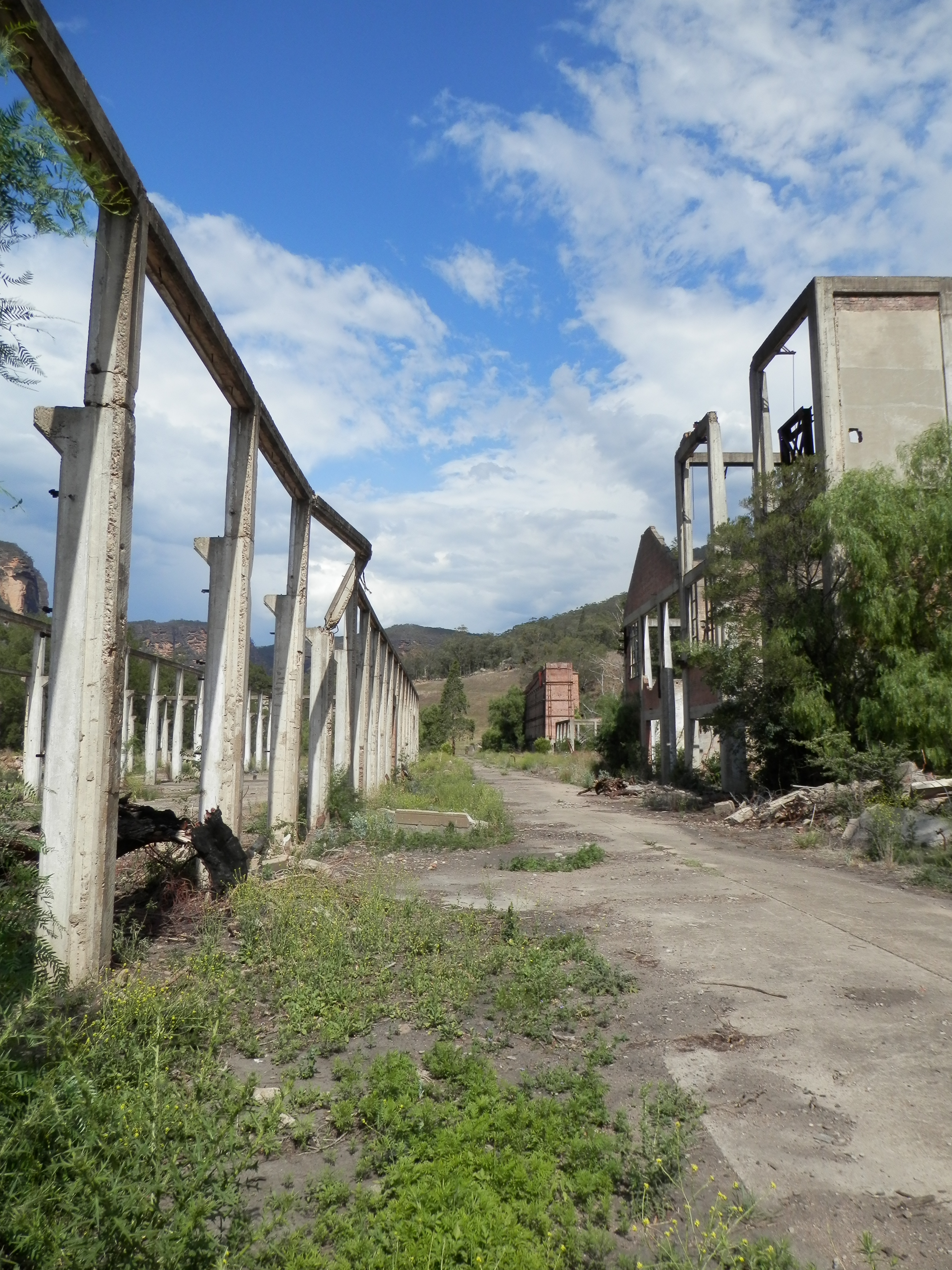
Ruins of workshop (left), boiler house (right), and retorts (background) in Nov. 2014.

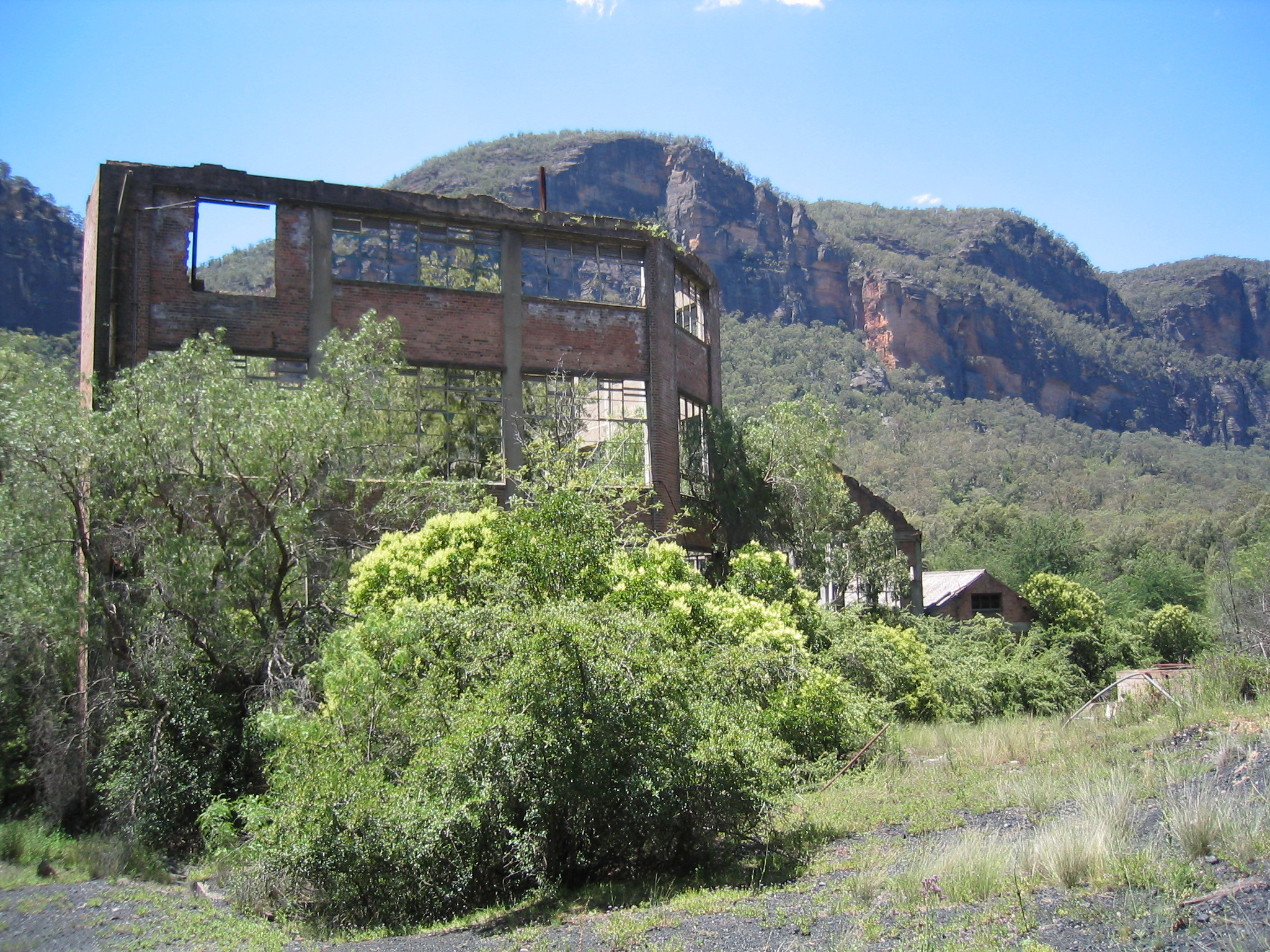
Overgrown ruins of buildings (Jan 2005)

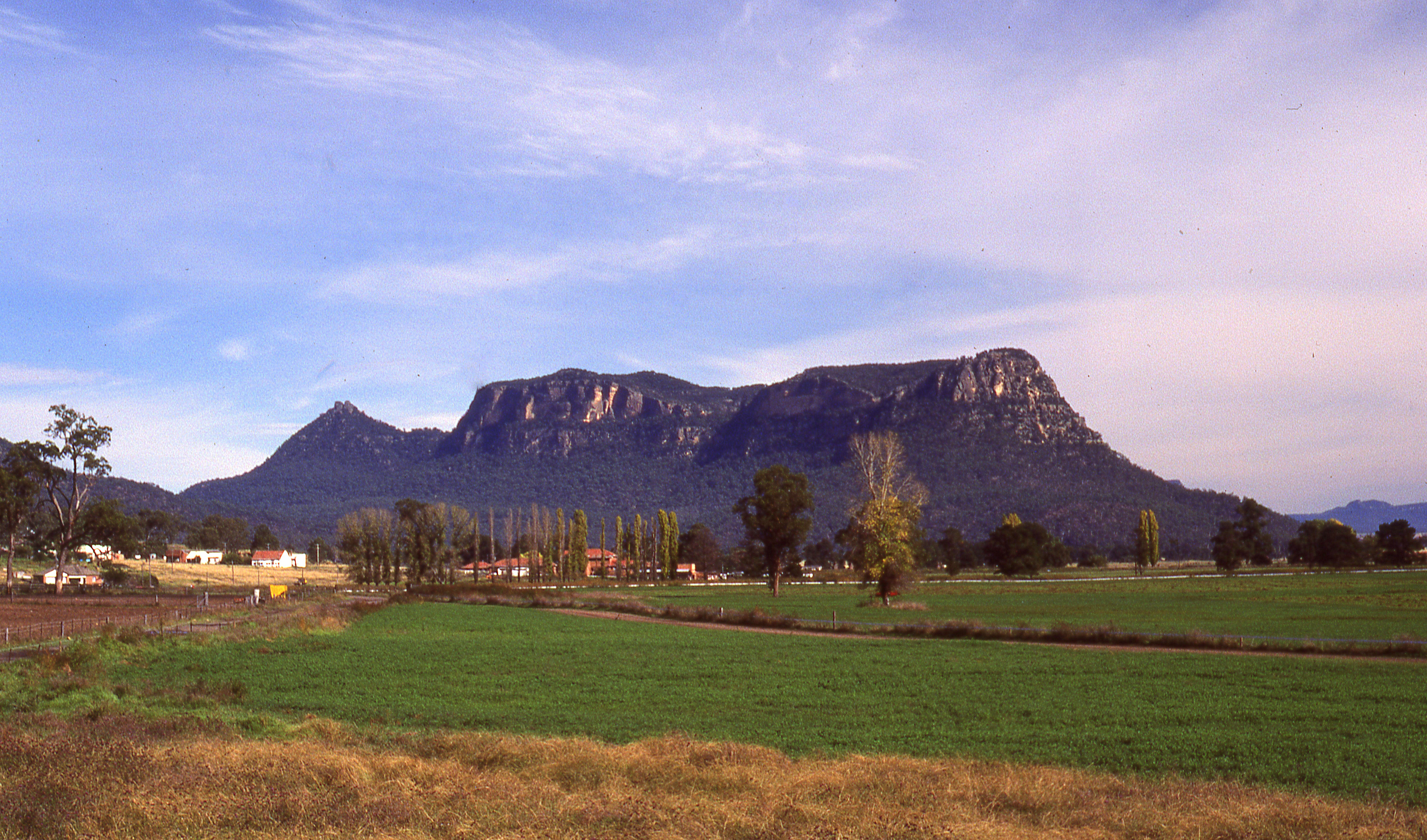
Remaining township, with Mt Gundangaroo in the background.

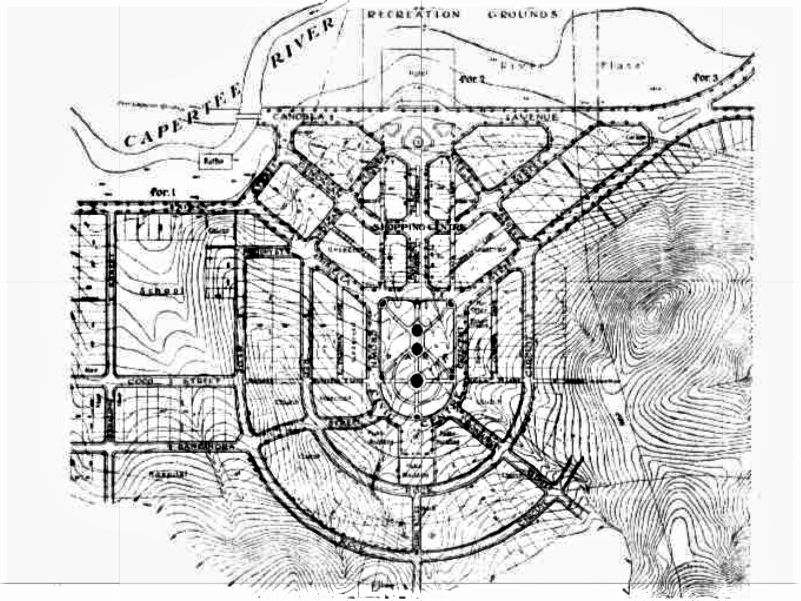
Town Plan of Glen Davis (1939)

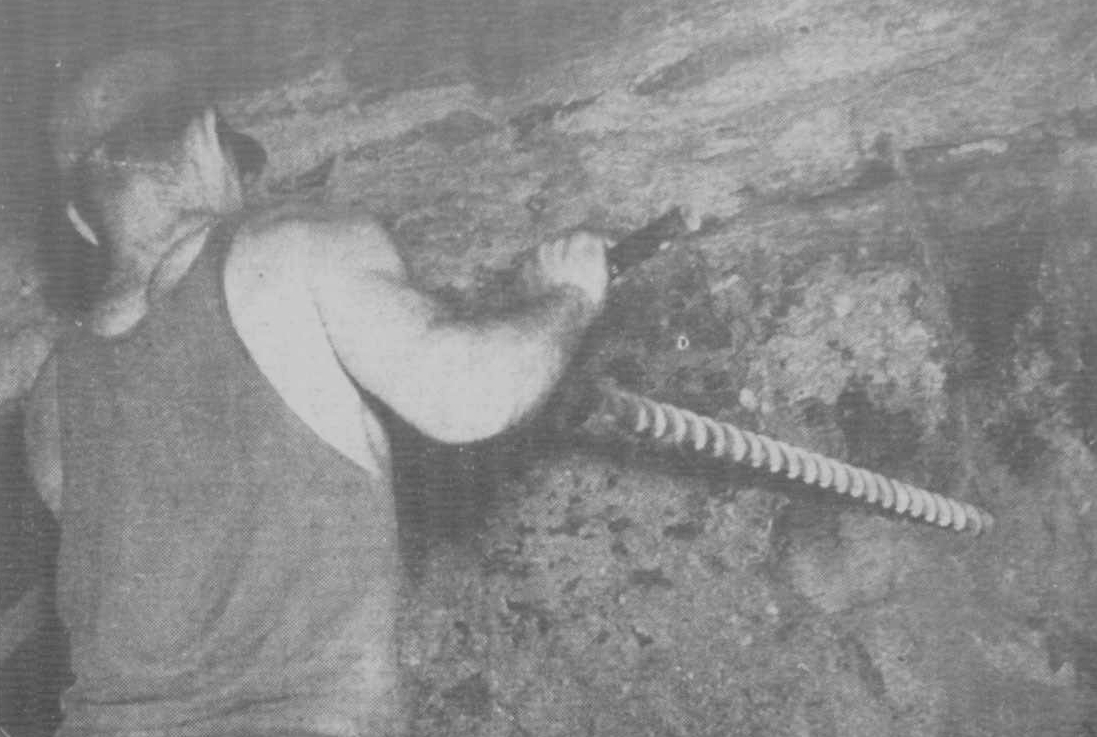
Drilling a charge hole into shale seam, 1939.

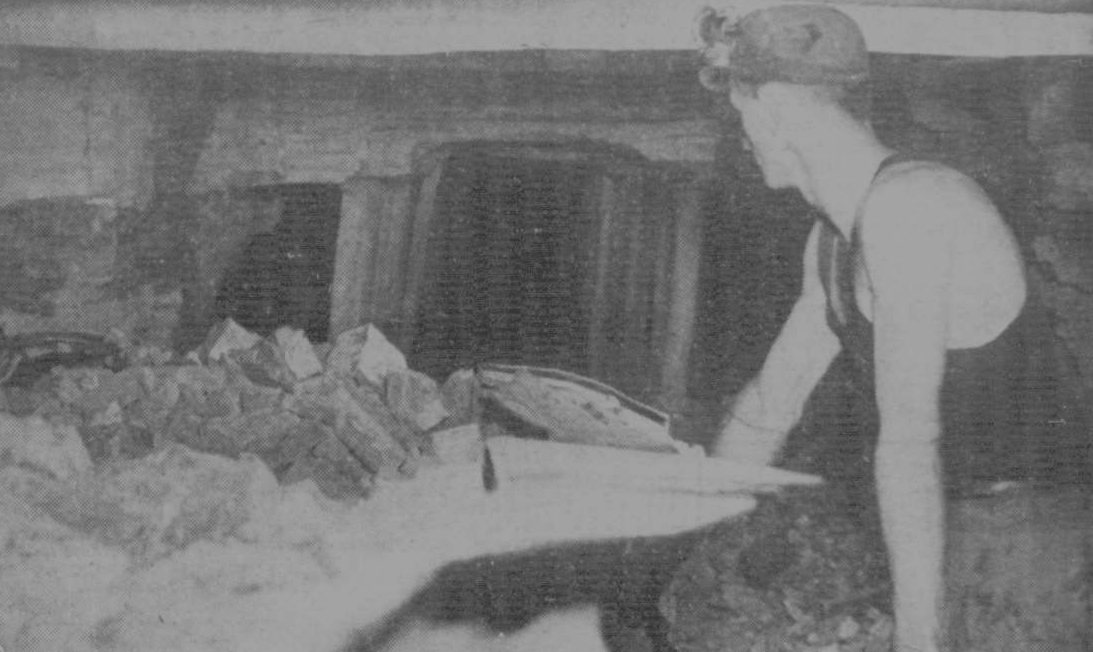
Loading mined shale underground, 1939

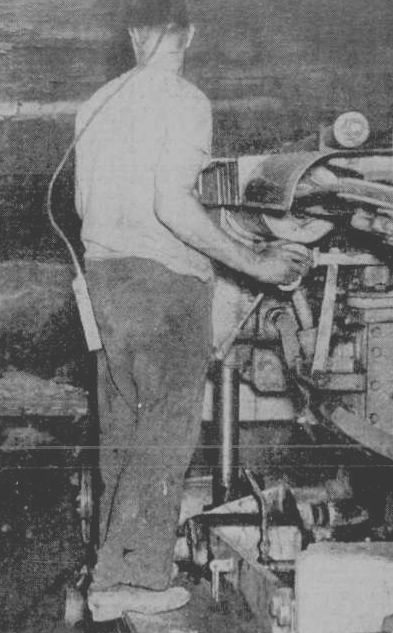
Electric cutter biting into shale seam, 1939

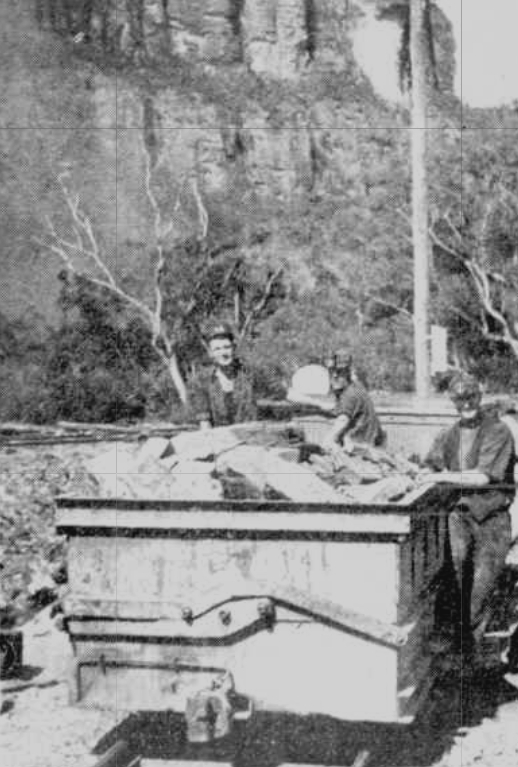
Truckload of mined shale on way from mine to dump, 1939

== See also ==
- Glen Davis, New South Wales
- George Francis Davis
- Newnes, New South Wales
- Joadja, New South Wales
- List of oil shale operations in Australia
