= Newport Power Station =

Gas-fired power station in Victoria, Australia

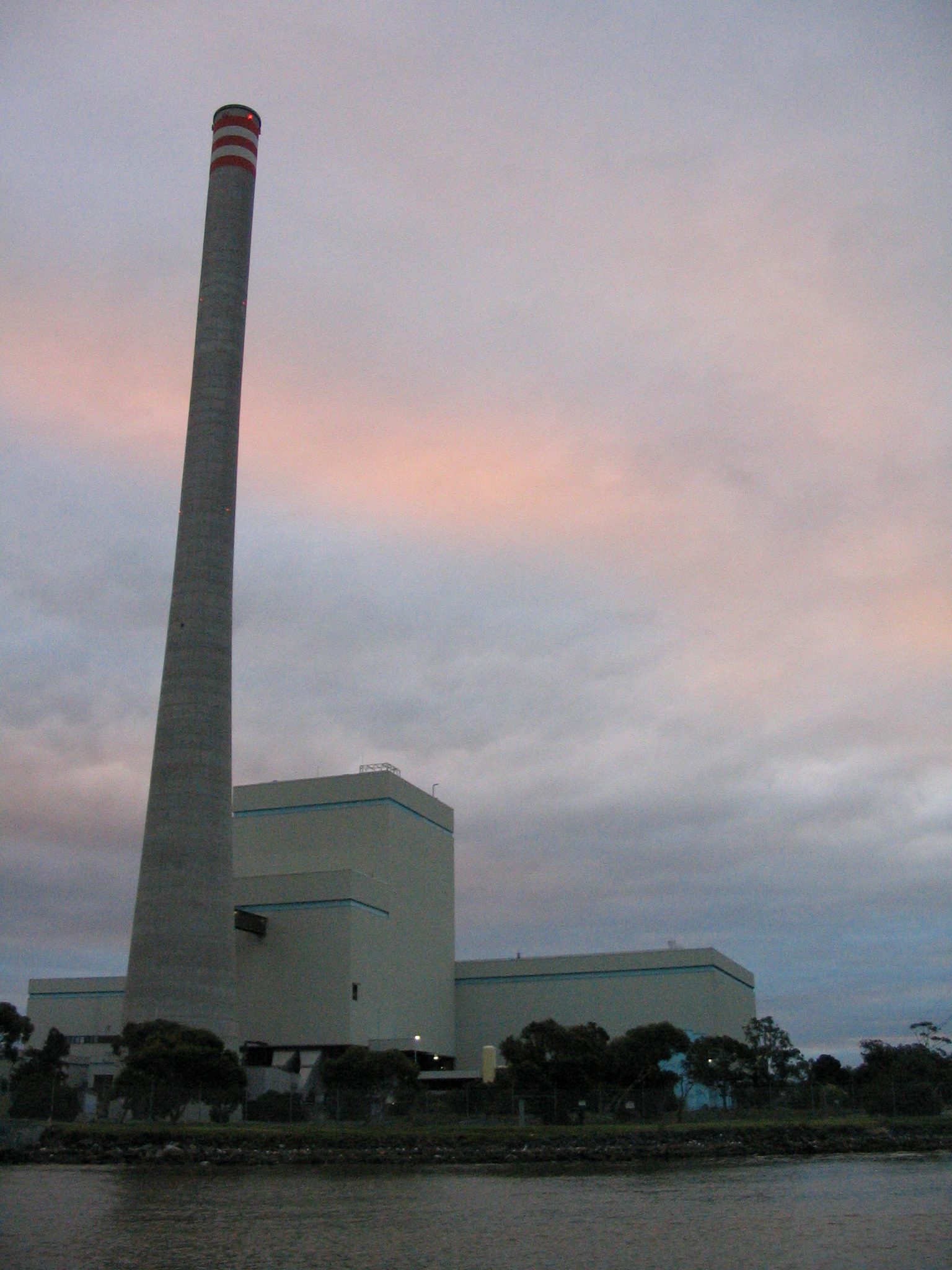
- Country: Australia
- Coordinates: 37°50′30.5″S 144°53′42″E
- Status: Operational
- Commission date: 1981
- Owner: Ecogen Energy

Thermal power station
- Primary fuel: Natural gas
- Turbine technology: Combined-cycle
- Combined cycle?: Yes

Power generation
- Nameplate capacity: 510 MW

External links
- Website: www.energyaustralia.com.au/about-us/energy-generation/newport-power-station

The Newport Power Station was a complex of power stations located on the west bank of the Yarra River, approximately 6 km south-west of Melbourne, Victoria, Australia, in the suburb of Newport. Newport A, B, and C were coal-fired plants which operated at the site between 1919 and the 1980s, and were claimed to be (in terms of the amount of plant) the largest power station in the southern hemisphere in 1953 with 42 boilers and 14 turbo-alternators producing 327 megawatts (439,000 hp).

Newport D is a gas-fired peaking power plant which has operated since 1981. It uses natural gas to generate steam in a boiler which supplies a three-stage steam turbine coupled to a generator to produce up to 510 MW (680,000 hp) of electricity. The plant has a single smokestack 183 m /600 ft in height which towers over the local vicinity.

The power station is owned by Ecogen Energy. The output from Ecogen's Newport and Jeeralang power stations is currently contracted to EnergyAustralia, the country's third-biggest electricity and gas retailer.

== Newport A, B, and C ==
Newport A was opened in 1918 as a coal-fired power station by the Victorian Railways to supply electricity as part of the project for the electrification of its suburban rail system. Initially, there were six turbo-generators; four were 15 MW (20,000 hp) capacity and two were 12.5 MW (16,800 hp). The speed was 1500 RPM and produced 25 Hz. Steam was supplied by 24 Babcock & Wilcox chain grate boilers at 250 psi (1,700 kPa). The two smaller generators were replaced with a 30 MW CA Parsons & Company and a 35 MW single cylinder Parsons alternator, numbered A2+A4. Steam was supplied by the four "M" boilers, which were pulverized coal-fired at 400 psi (2,800 kPa). The total capacity was 120 MW (160,000 hp).

Newport A also supplied electricity to businesses that required 25 Hz power, and supplied bulk electricity to the Melbourne City Council Electric Supply Department, the Melbourne Electric Supply Company and the State Electricity Commission of Victoria (SECV). Newport A was transferred to the SECV by the Newport "A" Power Station Act 1951 (No. 5554).

Newport B was opened by the SECV in 1923 to supply electricity to Melbourne until the Yallourn Power Station entered service. Initially there were two Parsons 15 MW (20,000 hp) generators. Speed 3000 RPM and 50 Hz. Later No.3 was installed with a 30 MW (40,000 hp) capacity, and No.8, a Stahl turbine with a capacity of 22 MW (30,000 hp). Steam was supplied by 10 B+W chain grate boilers at 250 psi (1,700 kPa). The total capacity of Newport B was 82 MW (110,000 hp).

Newport C, with a capacity of 120 MW (160,000 hp), was opened in 1947 by the SECV, after wartime delays. There were four CA Parsons & Company 30 MW (40,000 hp) turbo generators numbered 4, 5, 6+7. Steam was supplied by 8 "D" type ICAL chain grate boilers, each producing 175,000 lb/h (79,000 kg/h) of steam at 620 psi (4,300 kPa) and 840 °F (449 °C). These were the last chain grate boilers used in Victoria and were still in service in early 1981.

The power station boilers were originally fueled by black coal from New South Wales, but were converted to burn brown coal briquettes in the 1950s. Use of the plants declined with the opening of newer power stations in the Latrobe Valley, becoming used for peak loads in later years.

== Newport D: controversy and campaign ==
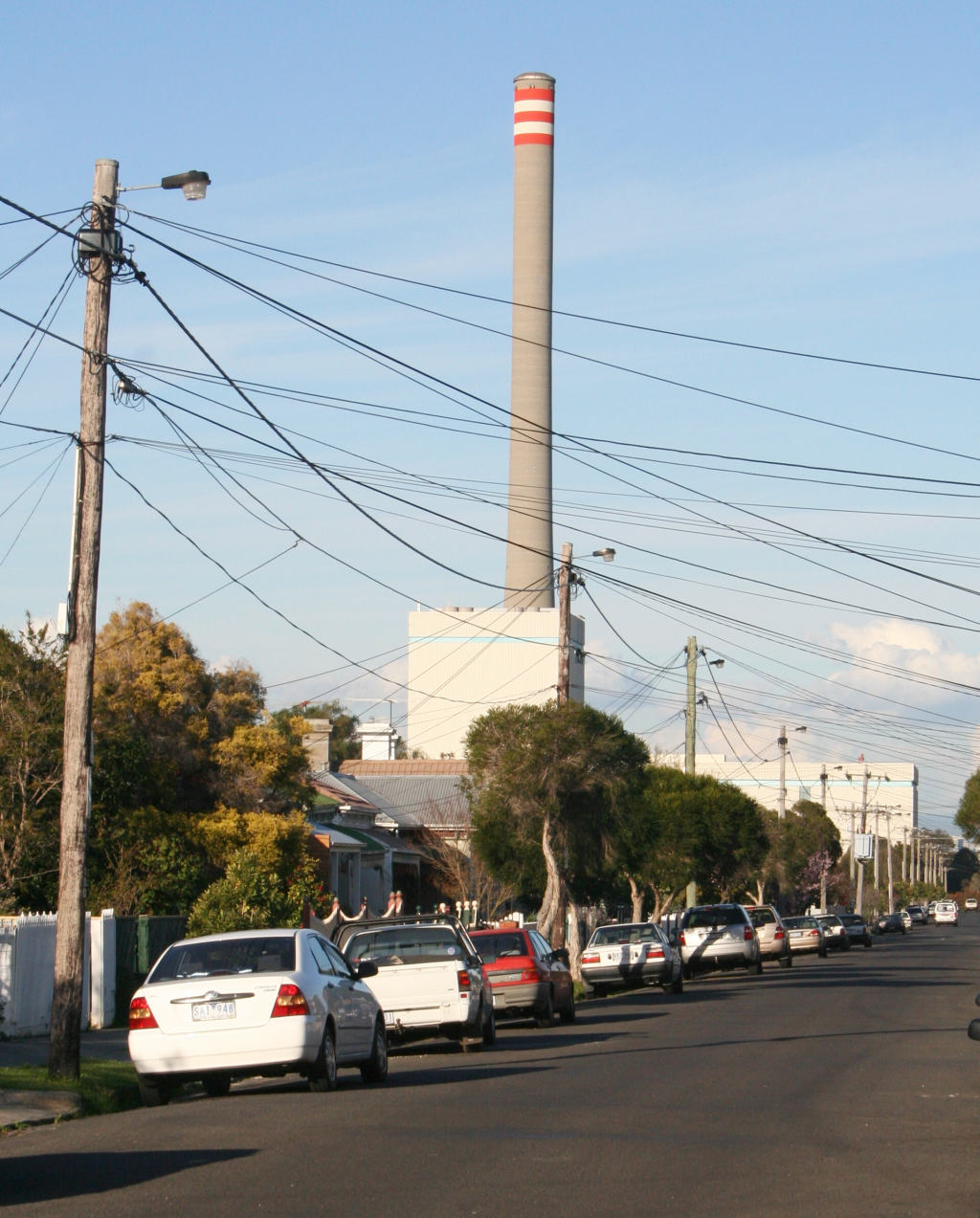
Newport chimney dominates the surrounding suburbs

Newport D is the current power station on the site. Its construction was immensely controversial, and was the subject of bitter opposition by trade unions and environmentalists throughout the 1970s.

After the SECV announced in 1967 plans for the construction of a large gas-fired power station in Newport, local residents began holding public meetings to discuss the potential harm to the community from pollution. In 1974, the Victorian Trades Hall Council banned construction on the site. Stan Williams, secretary of the Federated Engine Drivers and Firemen's Association, declared to the Premier of Victoria Rupert Hamer: "The fact is that we're not going to build it at Newport, and that's final." After a temporary retreat, the government attempted to restart the project, but the unions voted to reaffirm the ban. Hamer responded by suspending 300 construction projects and announcing a new law that would require secret ballots for construction bans, on pain of deregistration of the union involved. The aggressive response led to a gradual retreat by the union leadership, under added pressure from the poor economic climate.

The union leadership agreed to a compromise that a panel led by Louis Matheson would investigate the proposed plant. Matheson was considered unsympathetic to the campaign against the plant, because he had risen to national prominence as Vice-Chancellor of Monash University in the late 1960s, during a time of widespread student protest there. The panel's findings were mixed. Its interim report stated that even a 500 MW (670,000 hp) plant at Newport would do unacceptable environmental damage, but its final report in April 1977 endorsed the plant, but with only one 500 MW (670,000 hp) generator unit. There were claims that some panel members changed their votes at the last minute under political pressure. The campaign continued at the grassroots level, but the trade union leadership refused to seriously enforce construction bans. As a result, protesters invaded Trades Hall Council meetings, demanding enforcement of the bans. Protesters clashed with police at the construction site, while campaign meetings continued to draw hundreds of workers and residents. Nonetheless, with the union leadership refusing to enforce a picket or construction ban, construction went ahead.

As a consequence of the reduction in the planned power output from Newport D from 1,000 MW (1,300,000 hp) to 500 MW (670,000 hp), Jeeralang Power Station was opened in the Latrobe Valley, operating with gas turbines. Jeeralang power station has a capacity of 460 megawatts (620,000 hp) but is only used to meet peak loads. As a result, the actual capacity factor of Jeeralang station is less than 5%.

The Federal Government Clean Energy Regulator reported that Newport D emitted 538,108 tonnes (593,163 tons) CO_{2}-equivalent of Scope 1 greenhouse gases between 1 July 2017 and 30 June 2018. Australia's greenhouse gas emissions are reported under the National Greenhouse Accounts. The National Pollutant Inventory provides details of other pollutant emissions.

== Ownership ==
Until 1999 the gas powered Newport and Jeeralang power stations were owned by the government-owned Generation Victoria, and operated under the name Ecogen Energy. Ecogen Energy was sold by the State Government of Victoria in March 1999 to US-based AES Corporation subsidiary AES Transpower.

AES Transpower sold Ecogen Energy in December 2002 to Babcock & Brown and its investment offshoot Prime Infrastructure. In 2006 Babcock & Brown Power acquired a 73% stake, and Industry Funds Management (IFM) acquired the balance. B&B sold its stake to co-shareholder IFM in 2008. As at July 2017, IFM's 100% interest in Ecogen was up for sale. In 2018, Ecogen was sold by IFM Investors to EnergyAustralia for $205 million.
