= George Francis Davis =

New Zealand-born industrialist (1883–1947)

Sir George Francis Davis
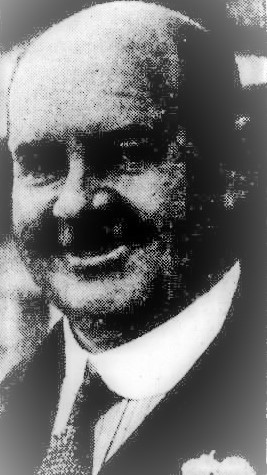
- George Davis c.1947

Personal details
- Born: 22 November 1883 New Lynn, New Zealand
- Died: 13 July 1947 (aged 63) Vaucluse, New South Wales, Australia
- Spouse: Elizabeth Eileen (née Schischka)
- Parent(s): Lillian Edwedinah (née Ball) and Charles George Davis
- Education: King's College, Auckland
- Occupation: Industrialist

Sir George Francis Davis (1883 – 1947) was a New Zealand-born industrialist. He is notable mainly for his association with Davis Gelatine, Cockatoo Island Dockyard and the Glen Davis Shale Oil Works, in Australia. Glen Davis, New South Wales is named after him.

== Early life and family background ==
Davis was born in New Lynn, Auckland, New Zealand on 22 November 1883. His parents were Charles George Davis and Lillian Edwedinah, née Ball, and he was their third and youngest son. Davis attended King's College, Auckland. He left school at 15, and went to sea for four years in the sailing ships of John Emery and Co., Boston. He was later to say that he wanted to join the navy, but was not accepted due to his poor hearing.

Both the Davis and Ball families were involved in glue manufacture in England. His parents had emigrated from England in 1879, intending to farm in New Zealand. Instead Charles Davis set up a small glue factory in New Lynn in 1881, moving to a new larger factory in Onehunga in 1888. The eldest son Charles Christopher (Chris) Davis was working in factory from 1892. By 1899 Chris was the manager of the company that his father formed in that year, New Zealand Glue Co. Ltd, in which his father held a one third share.

== Business in New Zealand ==
It was not until 1901 that Davis joined the family business. In 1903, his father bought out the other shareholders, and divided those shares equally between Davis and his elder brother Chris. In 1909, the company bought a rival manufacturer based at Woolston, a suburb of Christchurch, and George became the manager of the Woolston factory.

When their father died in April 1913, the two brothers decided to expand into the production of gelatin. George went to England to learn the craft from some of his mother's family. In 1913, plant for the manufacture of gelatin was added to the Woolston factory. It was soon supplying not only New Zealand but also Australia and Canada. In 1915, the middle brother, Maurice, who had been working as a marine engineer, joined Davis at the Woolston factory.

The industry of gelatin and glue production, from animal skins, sinews, and bones, waste products of the meat industry, would make the Davis family's fortune.

== Expansion to Australia ==
After a share issue in 1916, a decision was made to expand to Australia. George who had set up gelatin manufacturing in New Zealand was chosen to set up a new factory in Australia.

He arrived in Sydney at the end of October 1917, and immediately bought 8 ha of land in Botany. Foundations of the new factory were laid, in December 1917, and it produced its first gelatin in early January 1919. Botany was already the site of tanneries and other industries that produced by products of meat production, to which was added the gelatin made by the new factory.

Following the same pattern as in New Zealand, the Davis family bought out competitors in Australia and expanded the Botany factory. Davis's maternal cousin Jack Ball emigrated to Australia, in 1924, and became manager of the Botany factory and a director of the Australian company.

== Davis Gelatine ==
Between 1921 and 1926, the family interests were restructured so that the Australian company, Davis Gelatine (Australia) Pty Ltd, became the holding company, with subsidiary companies in New Zealand, South Africa and Canada, all under the name Davis Gelatine. George Davis was managing director of the company. The organisation sought additional capital from the public in late 1921, floating Davis Gelatine (Australia) Limited, issuing both ordinary shares and debentures, with the objective of paying down the debts incurred in its rapid expansion. It had already achieved market dominance in Australia, within three years of starting local production.

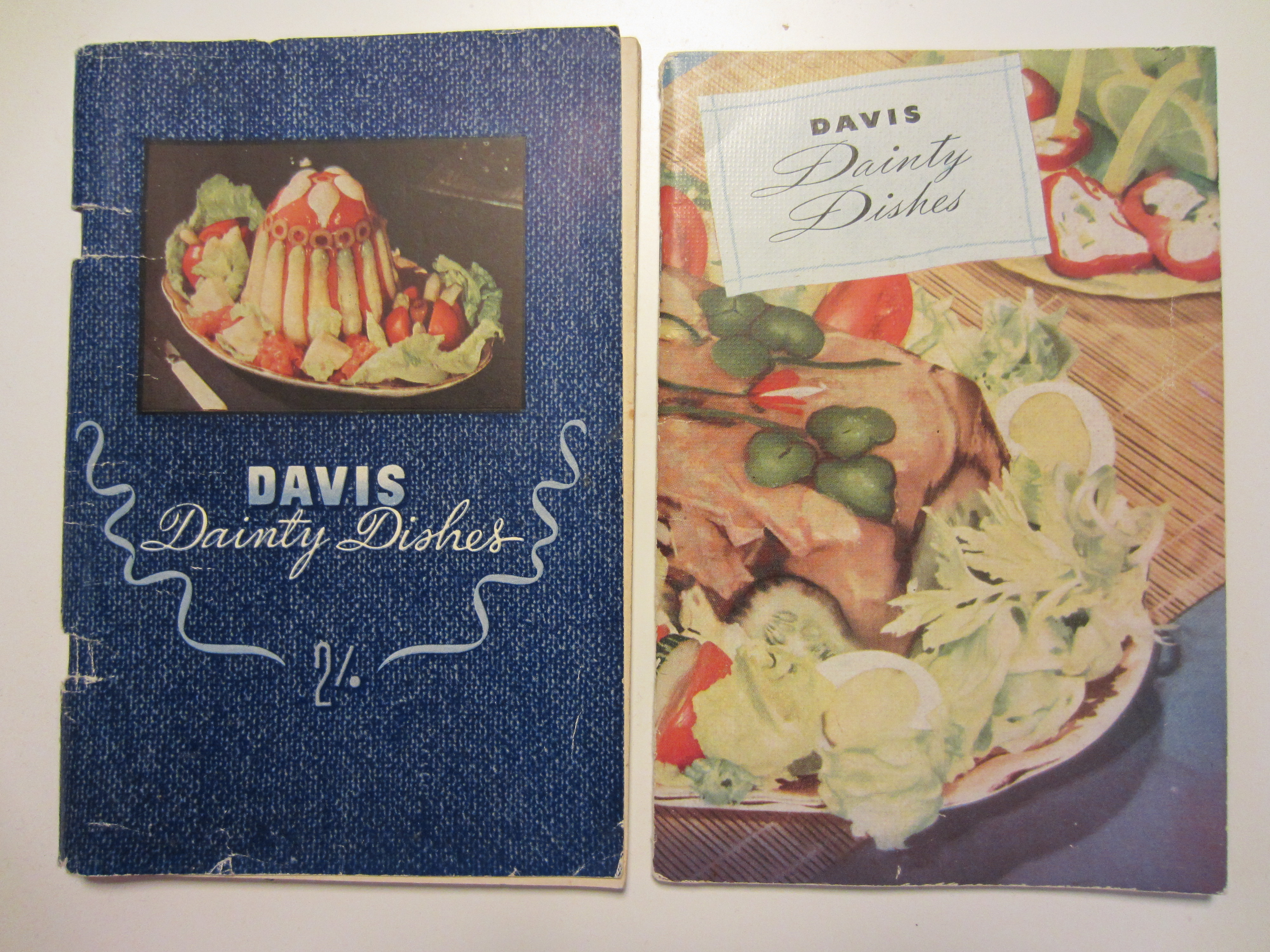
'Davis Dainty Dishes' recipe booklets.

'Davis Gelatine' became a famous brand. The company promoted use of gelatin through recipes for 'Davis Dainty Dishes' that it published, over many years beginning in 1922, both in booklet form and in publications, particularly the cookery pages of the Australian Women's Weekly. Davis Gelatine almost certainly took the concept of 'Dainty Dishes' from 'Dainty Desserts for Dainty People', and similar titles using the word 'Dainty', that were published by the Knox Gelatine Company of Johnstown, New York.'

The Davis Gelatine recipe booklets were published in Australia, New Zealand, Canada, and South Africa, and from 1932 in Great Britain. There were nine editions compiled between 1922 and 1947; a complete revision was made in 1949. The booklets would eventually be printed in five languages; English, French, German, Afrikaans and Portuguese. Over the years that the booklets were published, the total number printed was well in excess of one million copies.

As the main manufacturer of gelatin in Australia, the company also benefited from the demand for gelatin generated by other manufacturers. The main ingredients of jelly crystals—such as Aeroplane Jelly—were dry granular gelatin and sugar, with flavouring, and used in the commercial production of ice cream. Dry gelatin was added when canning some products, particularly canned hams. Gelatin was also used in the production of photographic film. It was a material with many uses.

== Factory at Botany ==
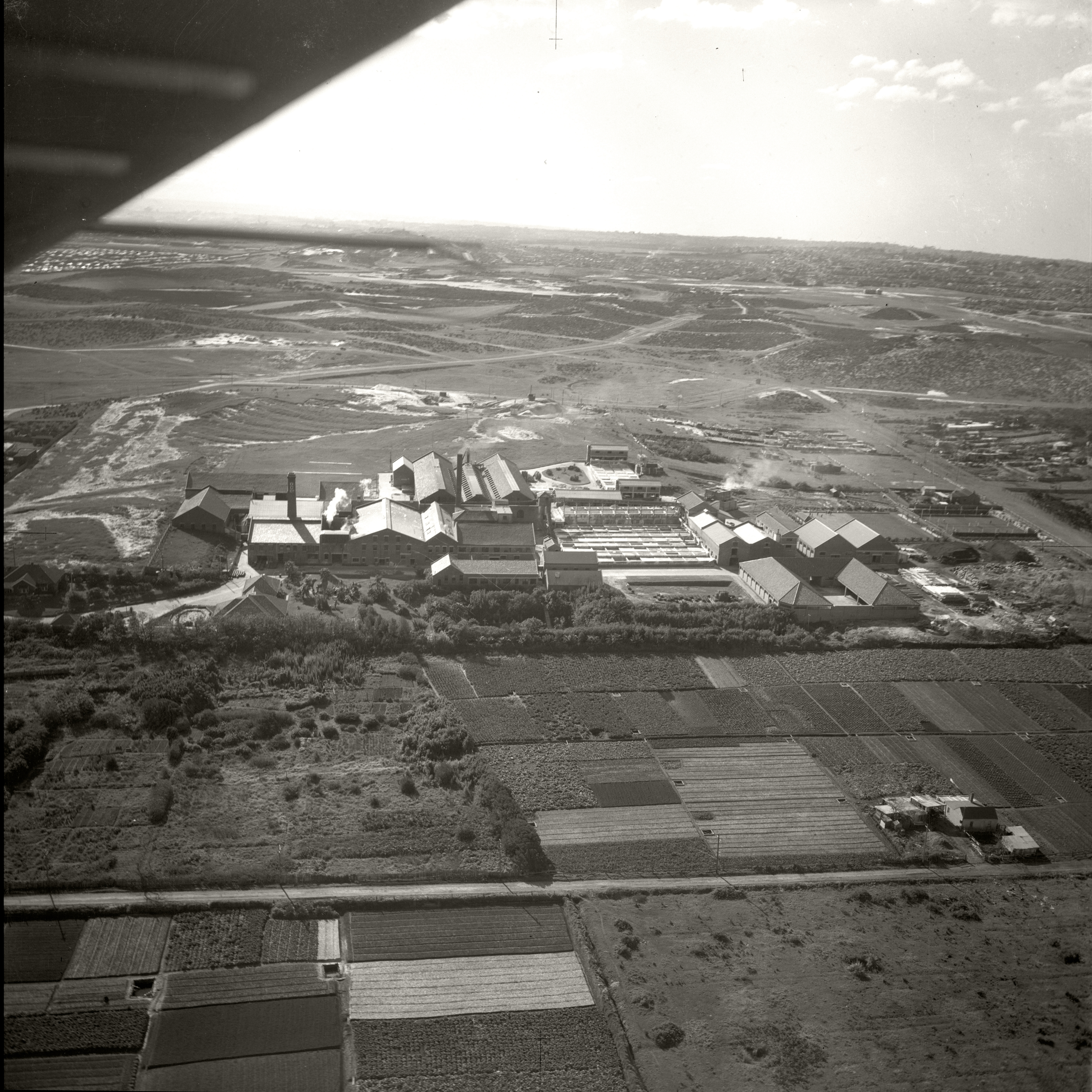
Davis Gelatine Factory, Botany, New South Wales in 1937

Davis set out to create a model factory at Botany. It was surrounded by park-like gardens and included facilities for workers, such as a bowling green and tennis courts.

The plant consumed four million gallons of water per week, drawn from the Botany Swamps aquifer and then clarified and filtered. The raw materials were pieces of animal skin that could not be used in the process of tanning and small sinews, both by-products of the meat industry. The process included acid baths, washing, and lime pits. Last was a drying room, reported to be like a 'tame hurricane', where the water content of sheets of gelatin were dried, reducing their thickness from 3/8 inch to 1/32 inch.

The plant was competitive, despite high wages, evidence that Australia had a competitive advantage in the production of gelatin, on a very large scale. By 1928, the Botany plant had trebled in size and was the largest in the world. The combined output of Davis Gelatine plants accounted for 10% of world production in that year.

== Marriage and personal life ==
Davis married in Sydney, on the same day that he had bought the land for the Botany factory. His wife was Elizabeth Eileen Schischka, (1889 – 1981)—known as Eileen—the Auckland-born daughter of a friend of his mother, who had come with him to Sydney. Her family had Bohemian ancestry.

Although he was keen on travel, gardening and motoring, as recreational pursuits, his business interests were his life. Davis was hearing-impaired and that made him reticent in company. He wore an early type of hearing aid. The couple had no children. From 1917 to 1930 they lived in a house adjacent to the factory at Botany. In 1930, they moved to a house in the harbourside suburb of Vaucluse.

However, his life remained dominated by business, as he became involved in other areas of activity that were important to Australia's response to the deteriorating international situation during the 1930s and the Great Depression.

== Cockatoo Island Dockyard ==
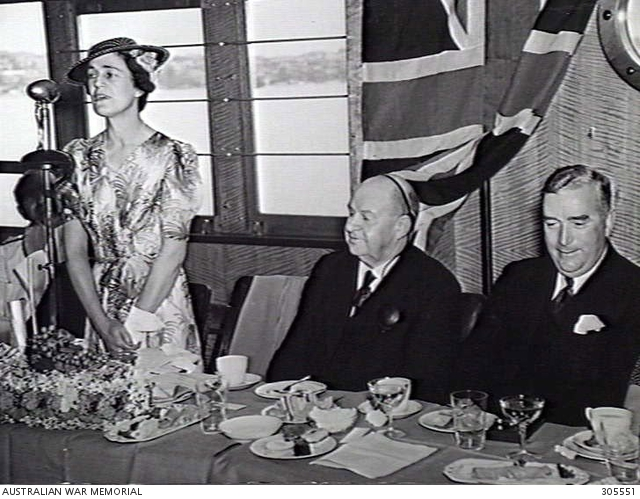
Pattie Menzies, George Davis and Robert Menzies, at the launch of HMAS Warrego at Cockatoo Island, 10 February 1940. The seated woman on the left (partially obscured) is Elizabeth Eileen Davis.

Possessed of seemingly boundless energy and initiative, Davis formed a syndicate of business interests to take out a lease on the moribund Cockatoo Island Dockyard, The yard had been badly affected by a High Court decision, in 1929, which effectively precluded the Commonwealth Government owned dockyard from tendering for work against private companies, and by the effects of the Great Depression. In 1933, Davis formed a new company Cockatoo Docks & Engineering Company to run the yard.

He turned the dockyard operations around and expanded the range of services it could provide, in time for it to become a vital part of the war effort. At its peak, the yard employed 3,500 workers, ten times the number that had been employed when the new company took over. Following the Fall of Singapore, it became the main ship repair base in the South Pacific for a period; 19 new ships were built there and major repairs undertaken on 40 Allied warships.

== Glen Davis and shale oil ==
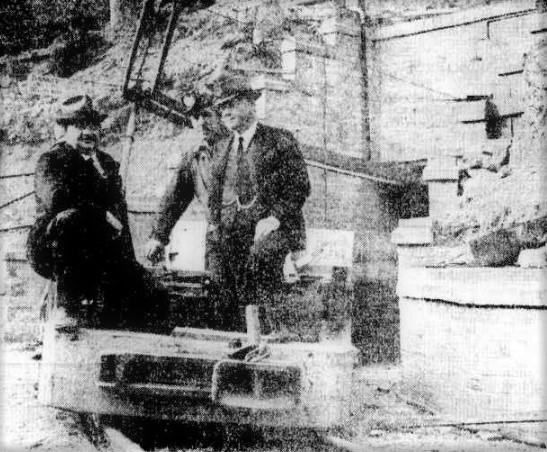
George Davis (left) with Premier Mair (right), during a visit to Glen Davis in 1940.

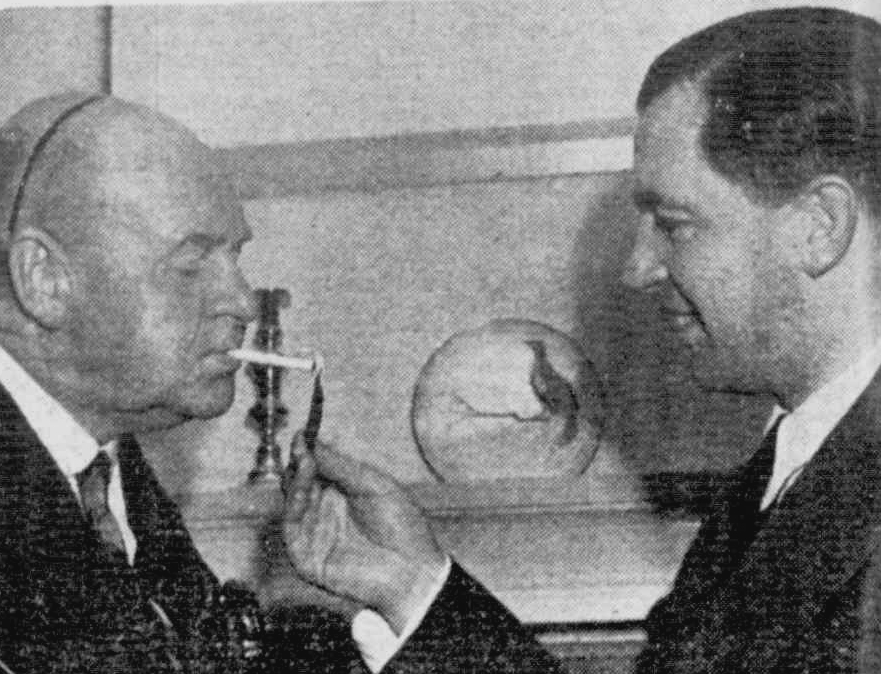
George Davis has his cigarette lit by Harold Holt using a burning piece of Glen Davis oil shale in 1939. Note the headband securing his hearing aid.

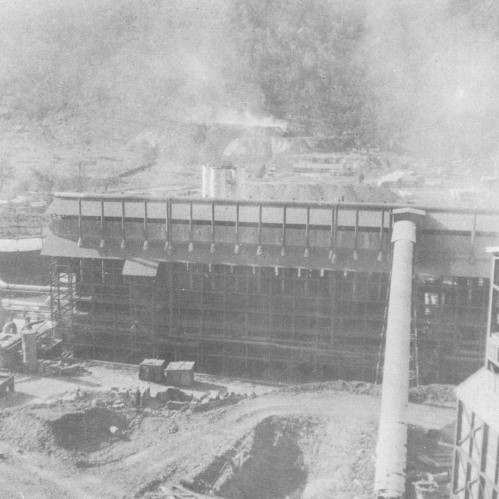
Retorts at Glen Davis

The revival of the dockyard had brought Davis to the attention of the Commonwealth and New South Wales governments, as a person who could tackle something new and get it done, quickly and effectively. However, both the governments at the time were controlled by the United Australia Party—a political party that favoured private enterprise as opposed to government ownership of industries—and rightly or wrongly, Davis was seen as being associated with that side of politics. In the 1930s, Australia was almost entirely dependent for its petroleum supplies on imports; at best there was some local refining of imported crude oil. There had been production of oil from oil shale, but this had ceased. The oil shale of New South Wales is particularly rich in oil content. The genesis of a revival of the shale oil industry was partially due a need for a secure source of oil in wartime, and partially to provide employment for unemployed miners on the Western coalfield. These dual objectives, efficient local oil production and employment creation, would not always align in their outcomes.

A public notice in the Commonwealth of Australia Gazette, on 28 May 1936, invited offers for developing the oil industry in the Glen Davis area. Davis responded to this invitation and the result was the agreement ratified in the National Oil Proprietary Limited Agreement Ratification Act 1937, an act of the NSW Parliament.

Davis withdrew almost entirely from his other activities, and threw himself into the task of creating a modern shale oil industry. It was later said of him by Bertram Stevens that, "the Lyons Administration and my own, asked him to shoulder this further national obligation at Glen Davis. He promptly agreed, and without stint gave to it his time and boundless energy and much of his resources taking from it not one penny of reward."

He made a tour of existing plants in other countries, visiting Scotland, Germany, Estonia and the United States, over eleven months. He returned in January 1938. Samples of oil shale were sent to Estonia and the United States for trial processing into refined petroleum products.

A new company, National Oil Proprietary Ltd, had been set up to build and run the operations. The amount of capital for the company, £500,000, which would later prove to be inadequate, had been based on estimates made by the government. Davis contributed £166,000 and Commonwealth Government £344,000 (together the capital of £500,000), and the New South Wales Government provided £166,000 secured by debentures.

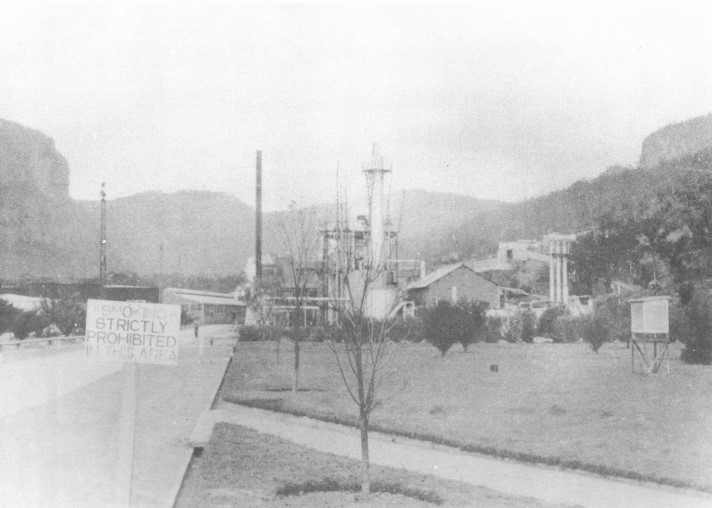
Refinery at Glen Davis.

Earlier proposals for restarting shale oil production had been based on resurrecting Newnes, by bringing shale from the Capertee Valley, through a new mine tunnel between the Wolgan and Capertee valleys and processing the shale at the site of the old works, previously operated by Commonwealth Oil Corporation. Davis chose not to re-establish operations at Newnes but instead to build an entirely new plant in the relatively remote Capertee Valley. The refined fuel would be carried via a new pipeline running over a saddle from the Capertee Valley into the Wolgan Valley, and then mainly following the route of the old Wolgan Valley Railway to new storage tanks at Newnes Junction. The old railway line was lifted, with some of the old bullhead rails being reused as supports for the pipeline.

Originally, Davis's plan was to use Estonian-made tunnel kilns, but as costs rose and war seemed imminent, a decision was made to rebuild retorts at Glen Davis, using designs and reused materials from the old retorts at Newnes; that decision resulted in an expensive and protracted relocation exercise, and old retort technology. Otherwise, Davis built a very modern plant, with a highly mechanised shale mine that promised to produce at a high enough rate to make the plant economically viable.

Work on the new plant began in 1938, but the first oil was not produced at the remotely situated plant until January 1940, by which time Australia was at war. The plant had cost £1,300,000, and more capital was raised from shareholders, with the Commonwealth Government providing more funds in the form of a £225,000 loan.

The initial rate of production was disappointing. In 1941, the UAP lost power to the Labor Party. The incoming Curtin government was fearful for its investment and anxious about the precious oil supply, and its Minister for Supply and Development, Jack Beasley, moved to take control of operations at Glen Davis.

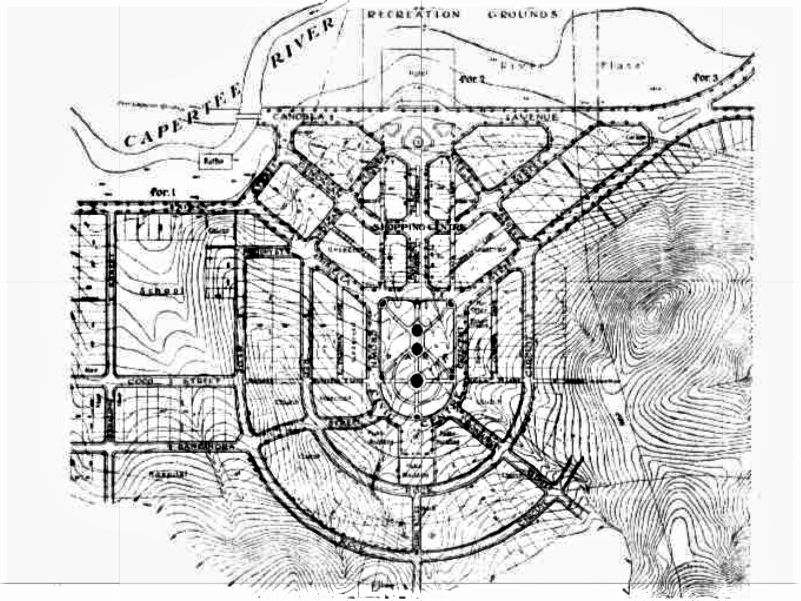
Plan of the town of Glen Davis.

For his role in establishing the industry, Davis had been knighted in January 1941. After December 1941, the by then Sir George Davis remained chairman of the board of National Oil but was effectively sidelined, as the board consisted largely of government appointees and he had lost his position as managing director. He resigned from the board in October 1942. He would devote most of his time thereafter to the Davis Gelatine company and the dockyard.

To house the workers of the oil shale works, a new town was planned by the New South Wales Government. Its plan would be influenced by the ‘Garden City’ movement, and was very much in line with Davis's own view on ideal workers communities. However, in its early years, conditions at the remotely situated town site were primitive.

The new town was named Glen Davis, after Davis himself.

== Later life, death and legacy ==
Following the end of World War II, Davis and his wife left Australia for ten months—up to the end of December 1946—during which time they visited overseas branches of his companies—in England, South Africa, Canada, and America—and also visited Norway and Sweden. It is probable that during this time Davis discussed the sale of Cockatoo Dockyard & Engineering with its eventual buyer, Vickers.

Davis died at home of cardiovascular disease on 13 July 1947, after being ill for some weeks. He was survived by his wife, who died in 1981. At the time of his death, he was chairman of Davis Gelatine, and its associated companies, Cockatoo Docks & Engineering Company, Mount Frome Lime and Animal Health Products; and a director of Mercantile Mutual and Alluvial Prospectors Company.

Cockatoo Dockyard & Engineering was taken over by Vickers in 1947, having played a vital role during World War II. It was Davis who had saved it from terminal decline, during the 1930s, and expanded it to allow it to be such an important wartime facility. Following a change of government policy in 1972, the dockyard entered a long decline. It finally closed at the end of 1991. Cockatoo Island is now a UNESCO World Heritage Site.

Davis did not live to see the bitter end of his vision for Glen Davis Shale Oil Works. The government's intervention at Glen Davis was not successful, despite an expansion in 1946. Never profitable, the Glen Davis Shale Oil Works was closed in May 1952, once its accumulated losses had exceeded the value of capital and loans. Glen Davis soon became virtually a ghost town, declining from a population of 2000 at its peak to only 115, including the surrounding area, in 2016. The ruins of the old works are now a minor tourist attraction.

The Davis Gelatine company remained in family hands, under the leadership of one of Charles Christopher ('Chris') Davis's children, Malcolm Chris Davis (1917–2009), as a publicly listed company, Davis Gelatine Consolidated Limited. Malcolm Davis retired in 1978, after having expanded the business into areas such as sealants, paper conversion, food stabilisers and emulsifiers, PVC plastics compounding, gummed tapes and paper coating, wine production, and food essences and flavourings. He wrote a history of the company, Davis Gelatine: An Outline History, published in 1993. The company became a part of Fielder Gillespie in 1983. The factory at Botany was only closed in 1990. Its site was reused mainly for warehouses, and only a small part of the once extensive gardens remain. Gelatin sold under the brand name, Davis Gelatine, is still made at a modern plant in Beaudesert, Queensland, the sole remaining gelatin plant in Australasia, which is owned by DGF Stoess AG of Germany.

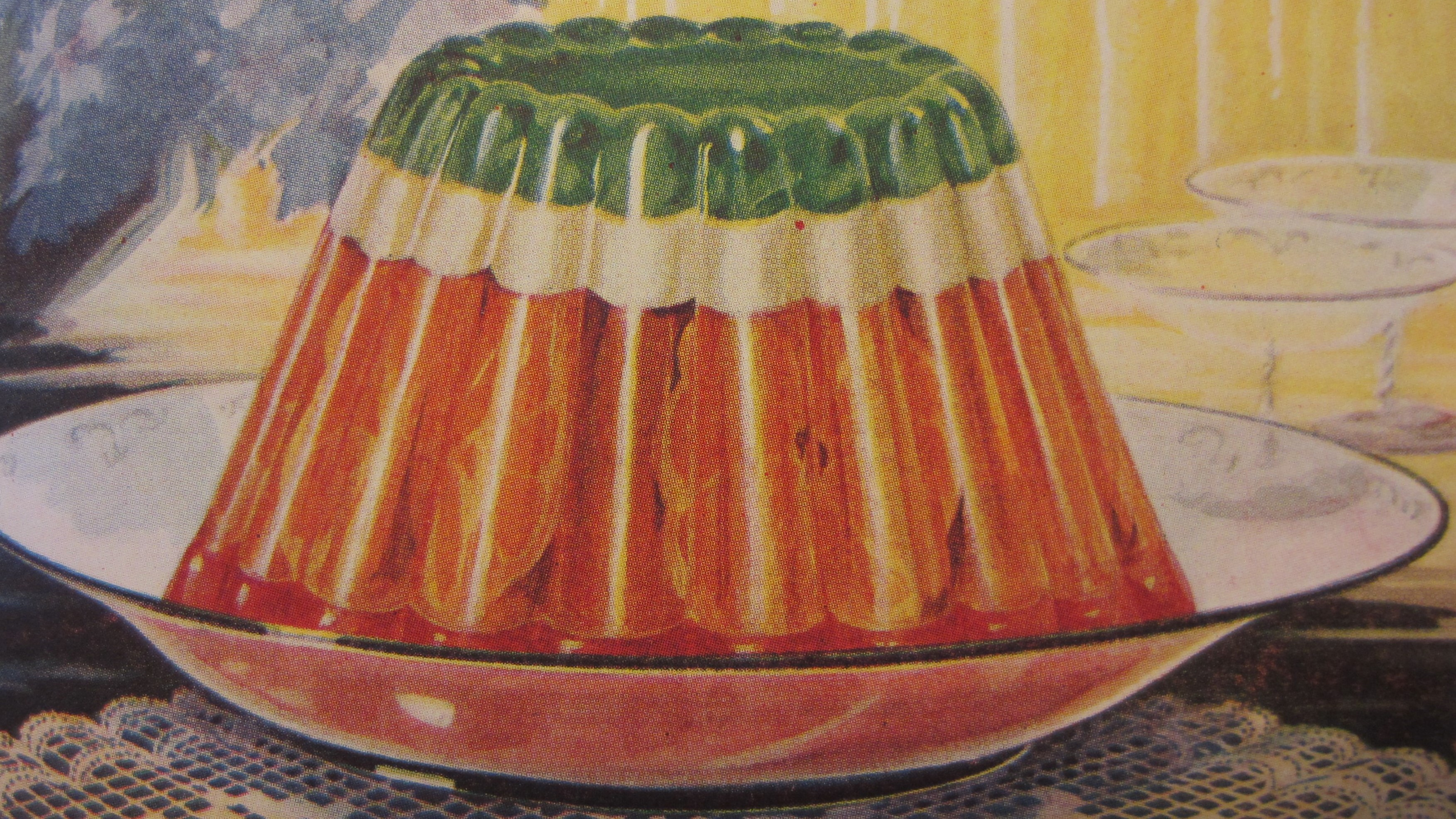
Davis Gelatine's dessert called 'Pavlova'.

There was still, in 2022, a thriving market in second-hand copies of 'Davis Dainty Dishes' recipe booklets, many of which seem to have survived the changing fashions of home cooking. The recipes use relatively large amounts of gelatin and, consequently, some appear quite unappetising, at least to modern-day tastes.

The 1926 edition of the recipe booklet contains what is probably the first known publication of a recipe for a dessert called 'Pavlova', seemingly giving it a firm place in Antipodean culinary history. However, Davis Gelatine's recipe is a multi-layered jelly, nothing like the Pavlova that is still very popular in Australian and New Zealand. Nonetheless, it is often referenced in discussions of the origins of the beloved summer dessert.
