= Hallett Power Station =

- Country: Australia
- Location: Canowie, South Australia
- Coordinates: 33.3487°S 138.7517°E
- Status: Operational
- Commission date: 2001
- Owner: EnergyAustralia

Thermal power station
- Primary fuel: Natural gas
- Secondary fuel: Diesel

Power generation
- Units operational: 12
- Make and model: Frame 5
- Nameplate capacity: 203 MW

External links
- Website: www.energyaustralia.com.au/about-us/energy-generation/hallett-power-station

Hallett Power Station is located in Canowie, in the Mid North of South Australia, located about 210 kilometres (130 mi) north of Adelaide. It was commissioned in 2001 and opened in 2002. It was built by AGL Energy, but was sold in 2007, and is currently operated by EnergyAustralia. It has capacity of approximately 200 megawatts (270,000 hp), and connects to the National Electricity Grid. It contains 12 gas turbine generators. The company plans a 50 MW / 200 MWh battery at the site.

The powerstation is fuelled by natural gas drawn from the Moomba Adelaide Pipeline System, and can also operate from a back-up supply of diesel in the event of a failure of the gas supply. It was built using second-hand gas turbines. These are all General Electric (GE) Frame 5 units, manufactured under licence by John Brown, AEG and Nuovo Pignone.
