= Mount Piper Power Station =

Coal-fired power station in Australia

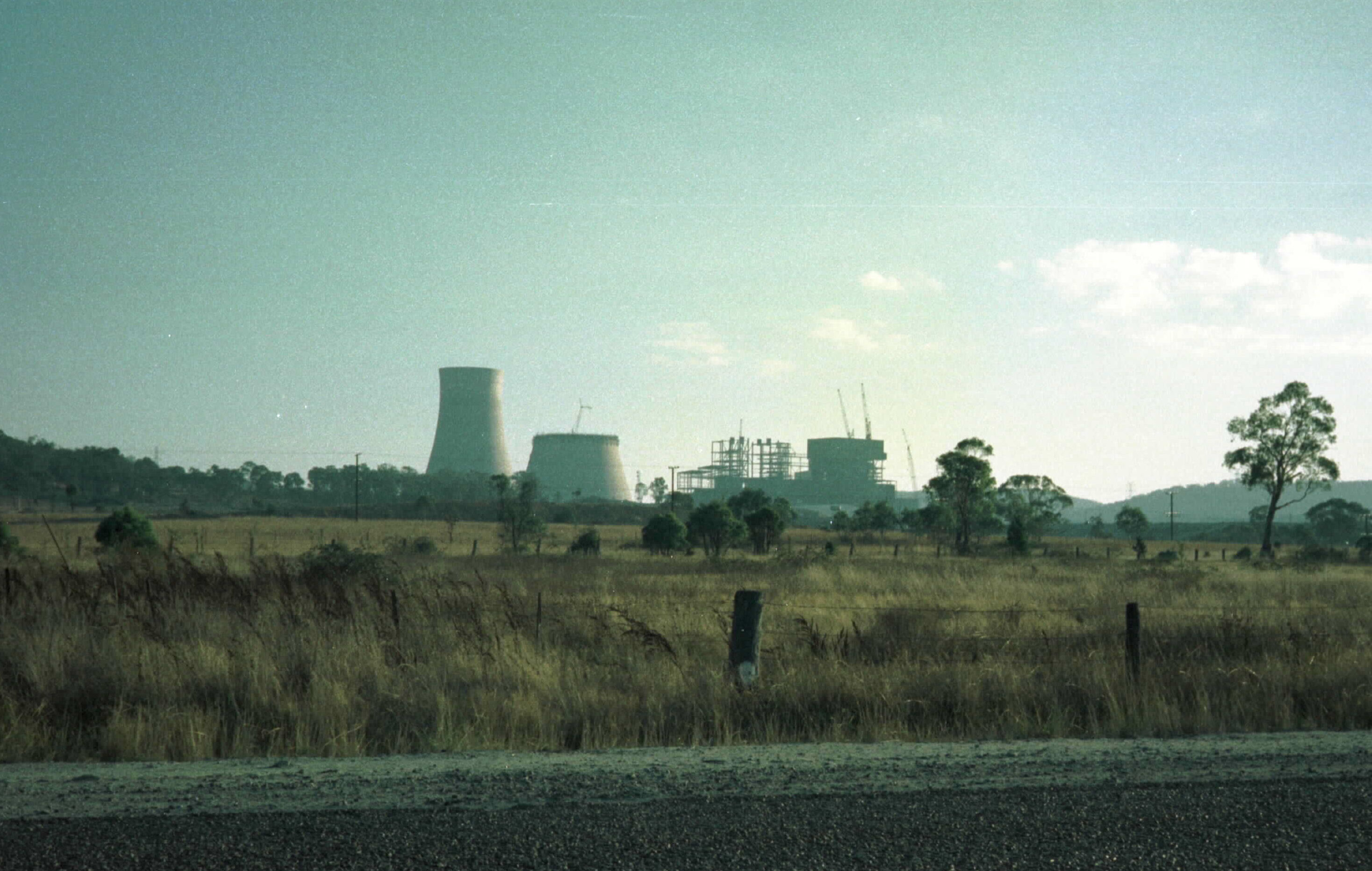
- Country: Australia
- Location: New South Wales
- Coordinates: 33°21′32″S 150°1′56″E
- Status: Operational
- Commission date: 1993
- Owner: EnergyAustralia

Thermal power station
- Primary fuel: Coal
- Turbine technology: Steam turbine

Power generation
- Units operational: 2 × 700 megawatts (940,000 hp)
- Make and model: Tokyo Shibaura Electric (Japan)
- Nameplate capacity: 1,400 MW
- Capacity factor: 56.60% (average 2017-2021)
- Annual net output: 6,941 GW·h (average 2017-2021)

External links
- Commons: Related media on Commons

Mount Piper Power Station is a coal powered power station with two steam turbines with a combined generating capacity of 1,400 MW of electricity. It is located near Portland, in the Central West of New South Wales, Australia and owned by EnergyAustralia, a subsidiary of CLP Group. On 23 September 2021, it was announced that the closure of the power station is being brought forward from 2042 to 2040 at the latest. The power station employs 250 workers.

== Construction ==
The first generator (Unit 2) was completed in 1992, and the second (Unit 1) in 1993. Units 3 and 4, although planned, were not built. It was the last power station built by the Electricity Commission of New South Wales (a body since abolished). Much of the design work done was undertaken in-house by the commission.

In 2009 Delta Electricity (the government owned enterprise that previously owned and managed the power station as a commercial entity) unofficially re-rated the units at Mount Piper from their original 660 MW to 700 MW.

In 2007 & early 2008 there was public talk of 'completing' the power station by using modern super-critical, dry-cooling tower, coal-fired units of up to 1000 MW capacity which uses much less water from surrounding rivers.

On 7 April 2010 the New South Wales Department of Planning announced that approval had been given to Delta Electricity to 'complete' the station by installing 2000 MW of new generating capacity. A 500 MW / 2,000 MWh grid battery is planned for the power station.

== Technical ==
Mount Piper draws its cooling water from Lyell Dam and Thomsons Creek Dam, both purpose-built for the station. Lyell Dam is located on the Coxs River 20 kilometres (12 mi) away. Large pumps draw water from the dam and pump it through a pipeline built between Thompsons Creek Dam and Mount Piper. Excess water that is unused by the power station is released into Thompsons Creek Dam. When no pumps are in service the water supply to the power station is gravity fed from Thompsons Creek Dam.

Carbon Monitoring for Action estimates this power station emits 9.08 million tonnes of greenhouse gases each year as a result of burning coal. The National Pollutant Inventory provides details of other pollutant emissions, but, as at 23 November 2008, not CO_{2}.

== Operations ==
Yearly generation (MWh) by unit
Year	Total	MP1	MP2
2011	10,242,151	5,163,830	5,078,321
2012	8,776,593	3,942,534	4,834,059
2013	9,854,146	5,340,532	4,513,614
2014	8,239,950	4,187,273	4,052,677
2015	5,467,455	2,796,720	2,670,735
2016	7,749,257	3,372,276	4,376,981
2017	7,344,075	4,189,078	3,154,997
2018	8,715,653	3,835,639	4,880,014
2019	4,691,506	2,423,968	2,267,538
2020	6,769,304	3,005,181	3,764,123
2021	7,185,315	3,870,977	3,314,338

== See also ==
- Wallerawang Power Station
