= Jeeralang Power Station =

Coordinates: 38.274339°S 146.425567°E

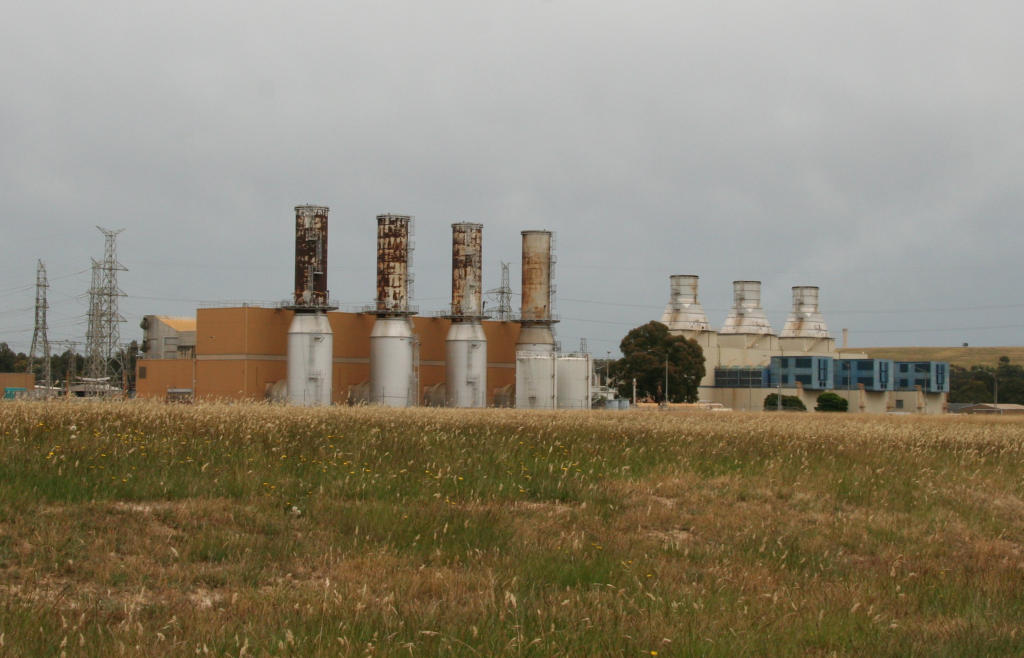
Four turbines of Jeeralang A to left, three turbines of Jeeralang B to right.

Jeeralang Power Station is a gas turbine power station with a capacity of 460 megawatts (620,000 hp) near Morwell, Victoria, Australia. The station is a peaking facility which is used only during periods of peak demand, and is also used as a black start facility to restore power to the grid in the event of major system failure. As a result, the actual capacity factor of the station is less than 5%. The power station was built by the State Electricity Commission of Victoria in response to the scaling back of Newport D power station from 1,000 megawatts (1,300,000 hp) to 500 megawatts (670,000 hp), as a result of community concerns and union bans. Jeeralang consists of seven gas turbines configured to operate in single cycle mode.

Jeeralang A was built between 1977 and 1979 and consists of four Siemens Industries V93.1 gas turbines with a combined capacity of 220 megawatts (300,000 hp).

Jeeralang B was built between 1978 and 1980 and consists of three Alstom Atlantique MS-9001 gas turbines with a combined capacity of 240 megawatts (320,000 hp).

The power station is currently operated by Ecogen Energy and was purchased by EnergyAustralia in April 2018.

The 350 MW / 1,400 MWh Wooreen grid battery is being built at the site for 2027.
