= Ecogen Energy =

Australian power station operator

Ecogen Energy is a power station operator in Victoria, Australia, managing two peaking power plants: the natural gas fired Newport Power Station and Jeeralang Power Station.

Initially, Ecogen Energy was a trading name of Generation Victoria and operated gas powered power stations until 1999. In March 1999, the State Government of Victoria sold the company to AES Corporation subsidiary AES Transpower for $361 million, $350 million allocated for debt reduction and $11 million received by the state.

In December 2002, AES Transpower sold Ecogen Energy to Babcock & Brown and their investment offshoot Prime Infrastructure for $81 million. A 73% stake was sold to Babcock & Brown Power in 2006 for $59 million. Babcock & Brown Power sold its 73% interest to co-shareholder Industry Funds Management in 2008 for $87 million, which held the remainder of the shares.

In 2018,
