= Fuse plug =

Collapsible dam to increase a dam's capacity

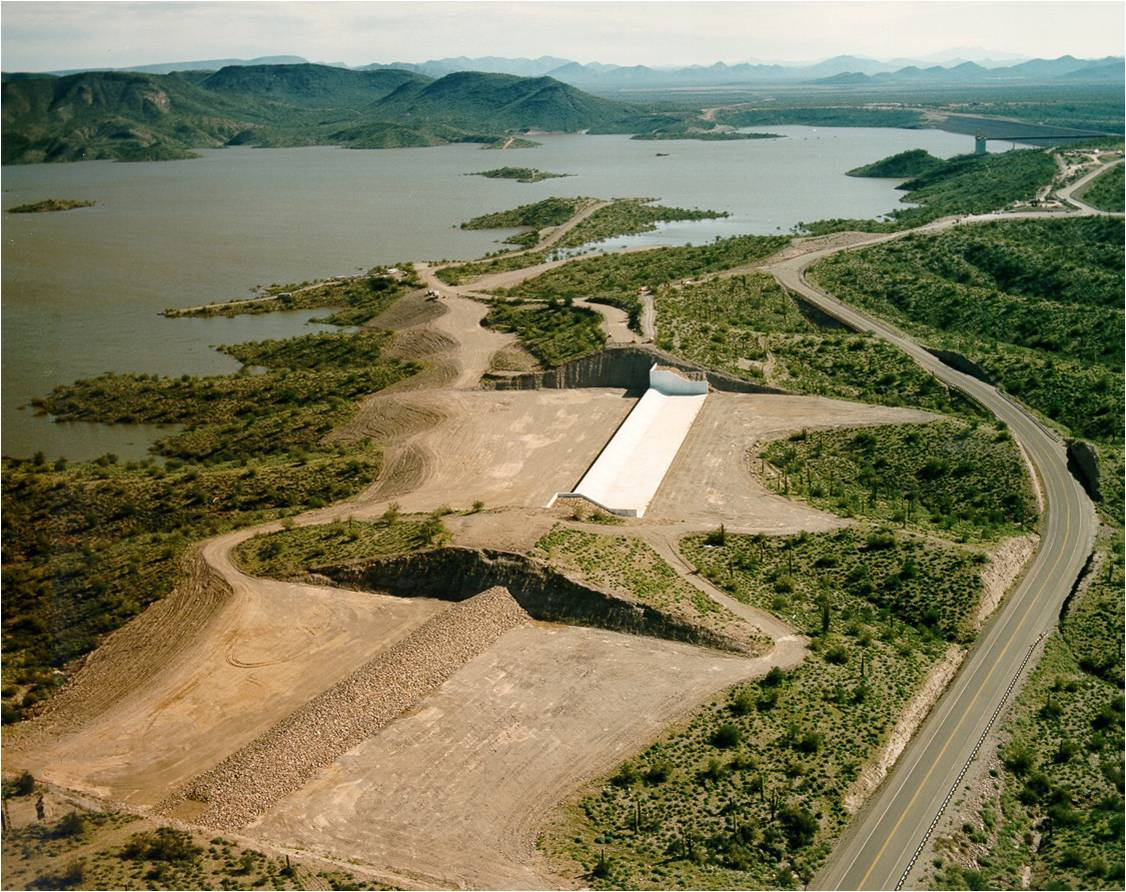
An emergency spillway with fuse plug (bottom) and an auxiliary ogee spillway (top) at New Waddell Dam

A fuse plug is a collapsible dam installed on spillways in dams to increase the dam's capacity.

== Description ==
A fuse plug can temporarily or longterm, depending on its design, increase the height and water retention capacity of a dam, either to create a larger reservoir against drought or temporarily impound flood waters above the level previously anticipated.

It may be designed into new construction, or added to an existing dam to increase its capacity, whether by correspondingly increasing the height of the dam, or taking advantage of any disparity between the top of the existing spillway and a higher water level that can be safely retained.

The fuse plug may be an earth embankment, sand-filled container, or other structure meant to break up into smaller components. Under normal flow conditions the water will spill over the fuse plug and down the spillway. In high flood conditions, where the water level may become so high that the dam itself may be put in danger, the fuse plug simply washes away and the flood waters spill over the original spillway.

An example is the Warragamba Dam in New South Wales, which has had its original dam height raised to increase capacity against both drought and cyclical extreme flooding, utilizing fuse plugs that are approximately 14m high.
