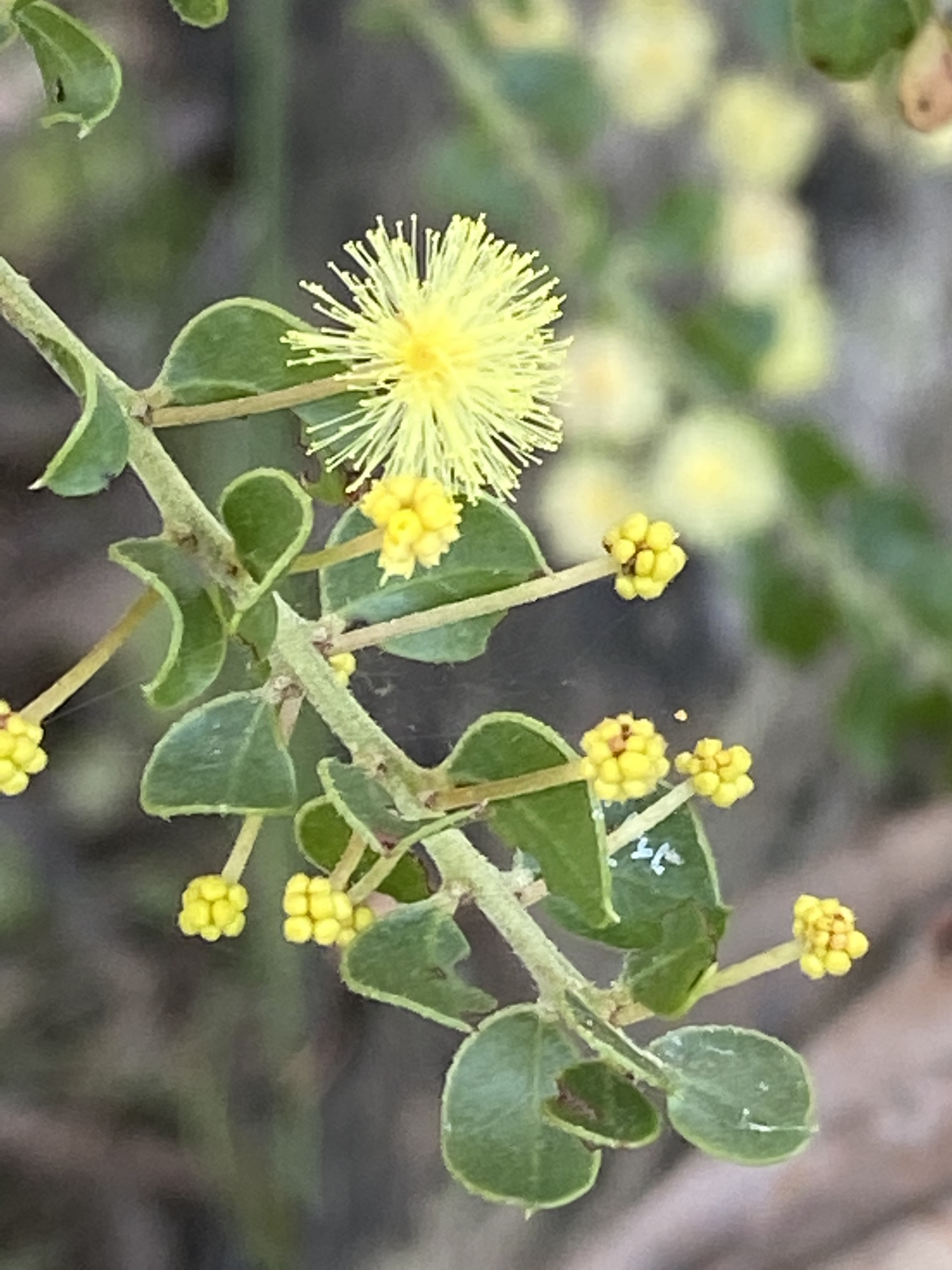

Conservation status
- Vulnerable (IUCN 3.1)

Scientific classification
- Kingdom: Plantae
- Clade: Tracheophytes
- Clade: Angiosperms
- Clade: Eudicots
- Clade: Rosids
- Order: Fabales
- Family: Fabaceae
- Subfamily: Caesalpinioideae
- Clade: Mimosoid clade
- Genus: Acacia
- Species: A. clandullensis

Binomial name
- Acacia clandullensis B.J.Conn & Tame
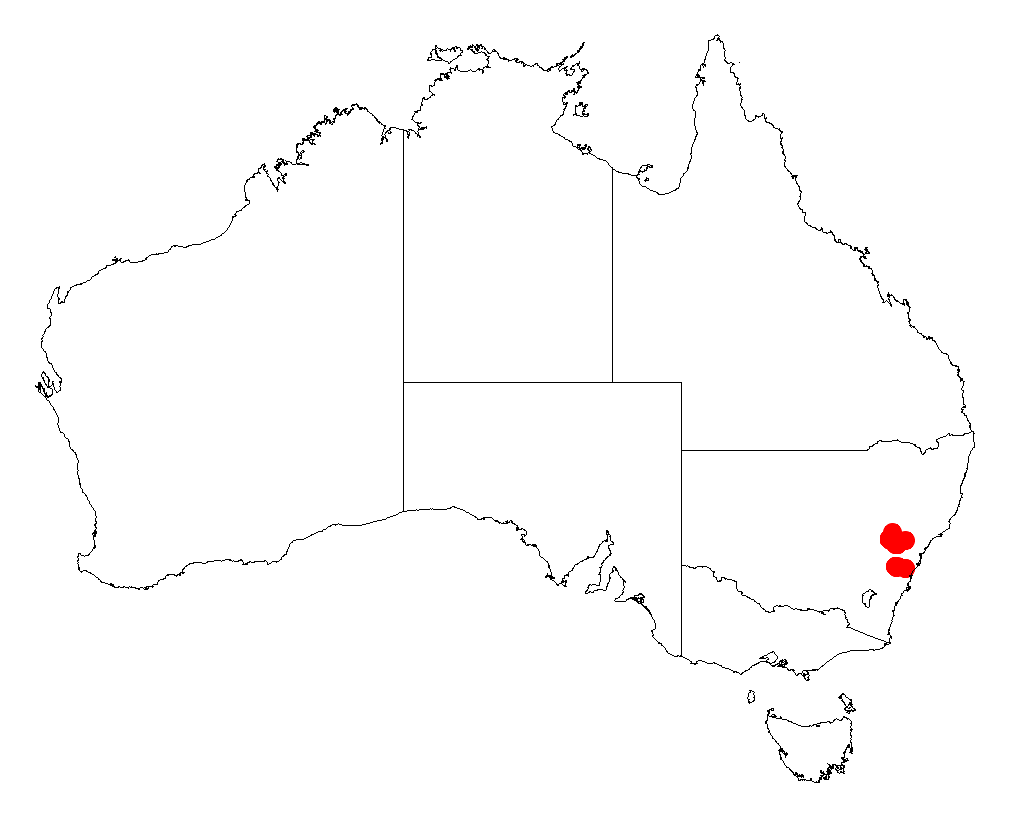
- Occurrence data from AVH

Synonyms
- Racosperma clandullense (B.J.Conn & Tame) Pedley

= Acacia clandullensis =

Gold dust wattle

Species of legume

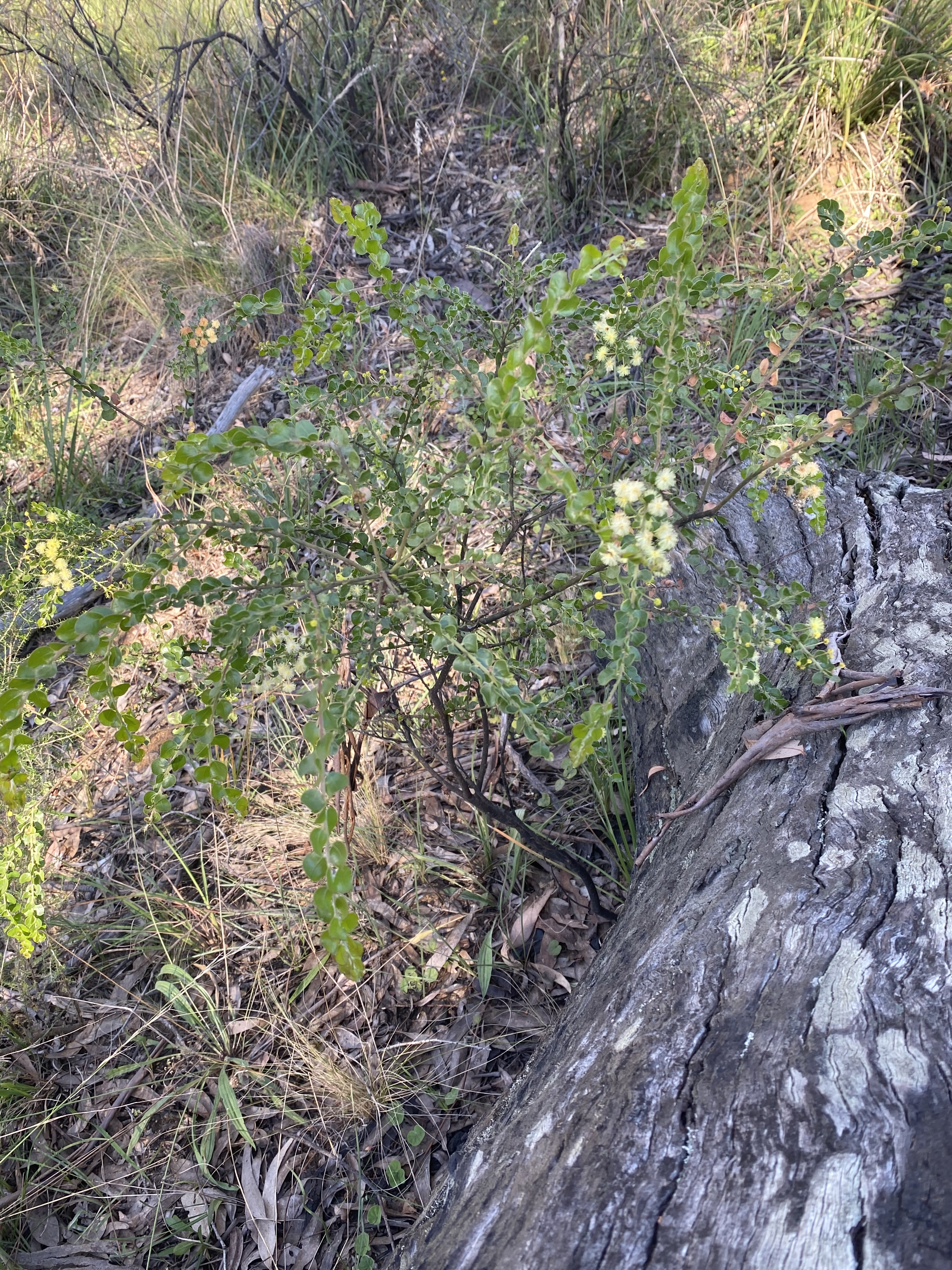
Habit in the Capertee Valley

Acacia clandullensis, commonly known as gold-dust wattle, is a species of flowering plant in the family Fabaceae and is endemic to New South Wales, Australia. It is an open shrub with hanging, densely hairy branchlets, more or less circular to elliptic or egg-shaped phyllodes with the narrower end towards the base, spherical heads of pale yellow to yellow flowers and straight, or slightly curved, glabrous, leathery to firm pods.

== Description ==
Acacia clandullensis is an open shrub with slightly ridged, densely hairy, hanging branchlets and that typically grows to a height of up to 2 m (6 ft 7 in). Its phyllodes are somewhat crowded, twisted or sometimes bent, more or less circular to broadly elliptic to egg-shaped with the narrower end towards the base, mostly 7–1 mm (0.276–0.039 in) long and 5–10 mm (0.20–0.39 in) wide, their bases in the same plane as the branchlets. The phyllodes are light green and wavy with scattered hairs. The flowers are borne in a spherical head in axils on a peduncle 3–14 mm (0.12–0.55 in) long, each head 4–8 mm (0.16–0.31 in) in diameter with 20 to 30 pale yellow to yellow flowers. Flowering occurs in most months, and the pods are flat, straight or slightly curved, leathery to firm and glabrous, 30–90 mm (1.2–3.5 in) long and 13–22 mm (0.51–0.87 in) wide and dark brown.

== Taxonomy ==
Acacia clandullensis was first formally described in 1996 by the botanists Barry Conn and Terry Tame in Australian Systematic Botany from specimens collected at Glen Davis by Roger Coveny in 1966. The specific epithet (clandullensis) refers to Clandulla, near the main area of occurrence of this species.

== Distribution ==
Gold-dust wattle is mostly found in the areas around Clandulla and Glen Davis growing at higher altitudes in stony sandy or clay-loam soils where it is usually part of open Eucalyptus rossii woodland. There is also a localised population near Yerranderie.

== See also ==
- List of Acacia species
