= Hibbertia coloensis =

Scientific classification
- Kingdom: Plantae
- Clade: Tracheophytes
- Clade: Angiosperms
- Clade: Eudicots
- Order: Dilleniales
- Family: Dilleniaceae
- Genus: Hibbertia
- Species: H. coloensis

Binomial name
- Hibbertia coloensis Toelken

Species of plant

Hibbertia coloensis is a species of flowering plant in the family Dilleniaceae and is endemic to the Wollemi National Park of New South Wales. It is a shrub with linear to lance-shaped leaves, and yellow flowers arranged in leaf axils, with twenty-four to twenty-six stamens arranged around three carpels.

== Description ==
Hibbertia coloensis is a much-branched shrub that typically grows up to 1.5 m (4 ft 11 in) high and 2 m (6 ft 7 in) wide. The leaves are linear to lance-shaped with the narrower end towards the base, 8–13 mm (0.31–0.51 in) long and 1.2–1.6 mm (0.047–0.063 in) wide on a petiole 0.3–0.7 mm (0.012–0.028 in) long. The flowers are arranged singly in leaf axils on the ends of branches on a peduncle up to 4 mm (0.16 in) long, with oval bracts 7–8 mm (0.28–0.31 in) long. The five sepals are joined at the base, the two outer sepal lobes 10–12 mm (0.39–0.47 in) long and the inner lobes 6.8–7.5 mm (0.27–0.30 in) long. The five petals are egg-shaped with the narrower end towards the base, yellow, up to 14 mm (0.55 in) long. There are twenty-four to twenty-six stamens arranged around the three hairy carpels, each carpel with six ovules. Flowering has been observed in October.

== Taxonomy ==
Hibbertia coloensis was first formally described in 2013 by Hellmut R. Toelken in the Journal of the Adelaide Botanic Gardens from specimens collected by Peter Weston in 2008. The specific epithet (coloensis) refers to the location of the type specimens.

== Distribution and habitat ==
This hibbertia grows in woodland in sand along the Colo River in Wollemi National Park, New South Wales.

== See also ==
- List of Hibbertia species
