= Wollemi Creek =

Coordinates: 33°13′S 150°31′E

Wollemi

Location
- Country: Australia
- State: New South Wales
- Region: Sydney Basin (IBRA), Central Tablelands
- Local government area: Singleton

Physical characteristics
- Source: Wollemi Range
  - location: Wollemi National Park
  - elevation: 685 m (2,247 ft)
- Mouth: confluence with the Colo River
  - location: near Glen Davis
  - elevation: 136 m (446 ft)
- Length: 84 km (52 mi)

Basin features
- River system: Hawkesbury-Nepean
- Tributaries
  - left: Putty Creek, Long Weeney Creek, Mellong Creek, Culoul Creek
  - right: Wirraba Creek, Koondah Creek, Dumball Creek
- National park: Wollemi NP

The Wollemi Creek, a partly perennial stream of the Hawkesbury-Nepean catchment, is located in the Central Tablelands and Blue Mountains regions of New South Wales, Australia.

== Course and features ==
The Wollemi Creek rises below Kekeelbon Mountains on the southern slopes of Mount Mounundilla, within the Wollemi Range, in remote country within the Wollemi National Park, north northwest of the locality of Putty. The river flows generally south southeast and south southwest, generally adjacent to the Putty Road, joined by seven minor tributaries before reaching its confluence with the Colo River in the upper reaches of the Colo Gorge, about 25 kilometres (16 mi) south southeast of Glen Davis. The river descends 549 metres (1,801 ft) over its 84-kilometre (52 mi) course.

The upper Wollemi Creek has two main sources, one originating at about 800 metres (2,600 ft) altitude 5 kilometres (3.1 mi) east of Mount Monundilla, and the other due south of that mountain. Both flow through rough deep gorges at about 600 metres (2,000 ft) in permanent dry weather flows, and fast flowing flood, until their confluence at about 300 metres (980 ft), due west of Putty, from where the creek flows eventually into the Colo.

The primary inhabitants of the upper creek are yabbies, eels, and possums. Some ancient massive gums populate the lower gorges and very few signs of non–native infestations are apparent, one notable exception being mistletoe which infests the upper branches of the oldest trees.

== See also ==
- Rivers of New South Wales
- List of rivers of New South Wales (L-Z)
- List of rivers of Australia
- Wollemia
