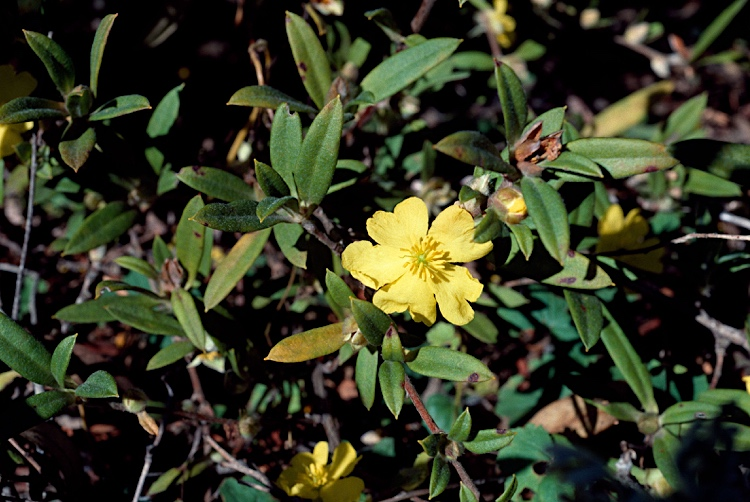
- In the Australian National Botanic Gardens

Scientific classification
- Kingdom: Plantae
- Clade: Embryophytes
- Clade: Tracheophytes
- Clade: Angiosperms
- Clade: Eudicots
- Order: Dilleniales
- Family: Dilleniaceae
- Genus: Hibbertia
- Species: H. saligna

Binomial name
- Hibbertia saligna R.Br. ex DC.

= Hibbertia saligna =

Species of flowering plant

Hibbertia saligna is a species of flowering plant in the family Dilleniaceae and is endemic to the east coast of New South Wales. It is an erect or spreading shrub with narrow elliptic to lance-shaped leaves with the narrower end towards the base and relatively large yellow flowers with 20 to 35 stamens arranged around three glabrous carpels.

== Description ==
Hibbertia saligna is an erect or spreading shrub that typically grows to a height of up to 2 m (6 ft 7 in), its young branches softly-hairy. The leaves are arranged alternately along the stems, narrow elliptic to lance-shaped, 20–110 mm (0.79–4.33 in) long and 4–15 mm (0.16–0.59 in) wide and sessile. The upper surface of the leaves is glabrous and the lower softly-hairy. The flowers are arranged on the ends of short side shoots, and are 30–49 mm (1.2–1.9 in) wide and sessile. The five sepals are joined at the base, silky-hairy and 12–16 mm (0.47–0.63 in) long. The five petals are yellow, about 15 mm (0.59 in) long with 20 to 35 stamens arranged around three glabrous carpels. Flowering occurs in spring.

== Taxonomy ==
Hibbertia saligna was first formally described in 1817 by Augustin Pyramus de Candolle in Regni Vegetabilis Systema Naturale from an unpublished description of Robert Brown, from specimens collected by Brown in "mountains near Port Jackson". The specific epithet (saligna) means "resembling a willow".

== Distribution and habitat ==
This hibbertia grows in moist gullies, on creek banks and in sheltered forests in eastern New South Wales, between the Blue Mountains, Glen Davis in the north and Batemans Bay in the south.
