= Colo River =

River in New South Wales, Australia

Colo
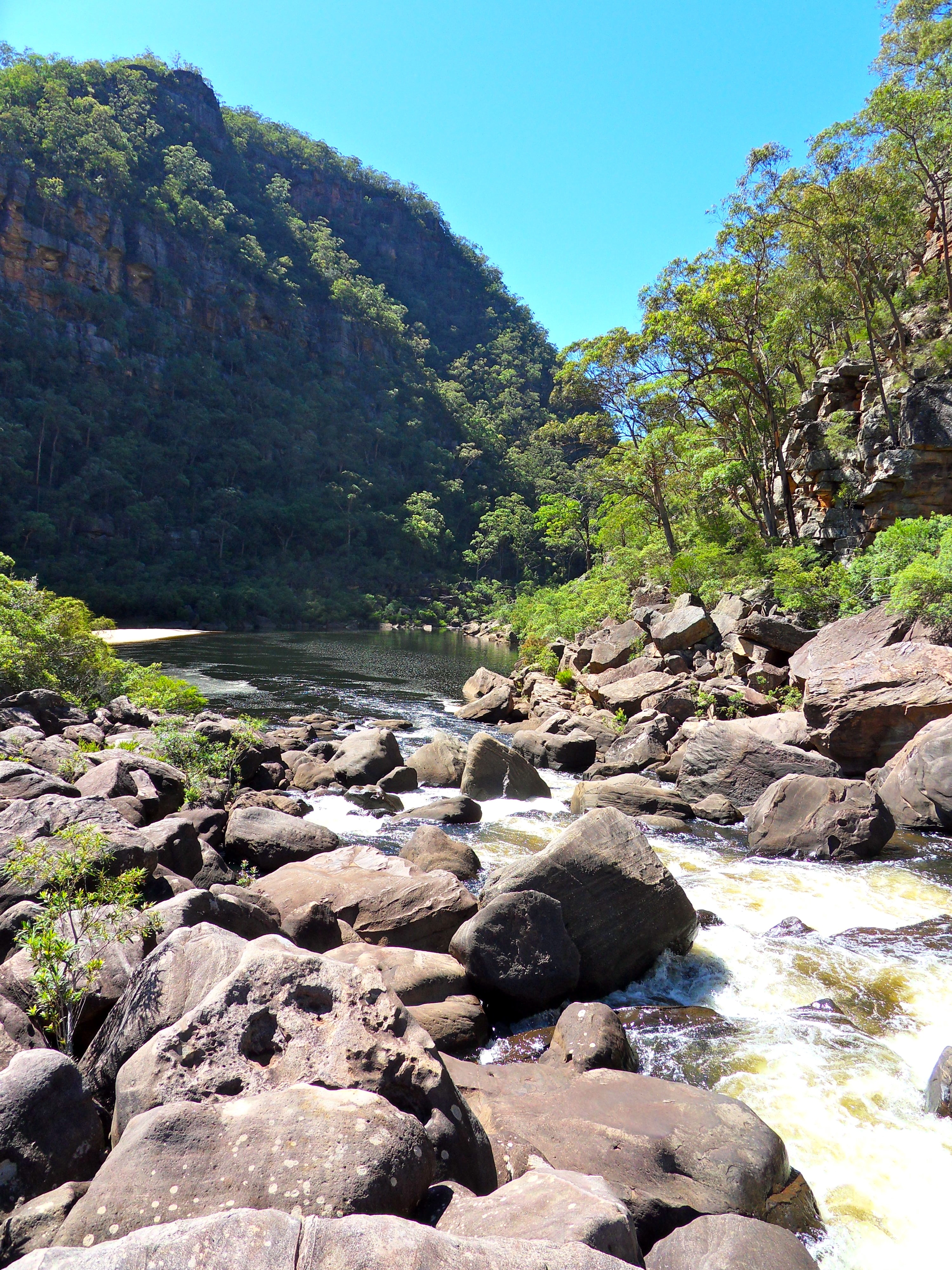
- King Rapids in Wollemi National Park, 2010
- The river's mouth

Location
- Country: Australia
- State: New South Wales

Physical characteristics
- Source: confluence of Capertee and Wolgan Rivers
  - location: northeast of Newnes in Central West region
  - coordinates: 33.20542°S 150.46524°E
  - elevation: 218 m (715 ft)
- Mouth: Hawkesbury River
  - location: near Lower Portland in Greater Sydney region
  - coordinates: 33.43722°S 150.88713°E
  - elevation: 4 m (13 ft)
- Length: 86 km (53 mi)

Basin features
- Progression: Hawkesbury→ Broken Bay
- River system: Hawkesbury–Nepean catchment
- Tributaries
  - left: Wollemi Creek, Dooli Creek, Angorawa Creek
  - right: Tambo Creek, Main Creek, Wollangambe River, Blacksmiths Creek, Gospers Creek
- Bridges: unnamed (Putty Road)
- National parks: Blue Mountains NP, Wollemi NP

The Colo River, a perennial stream that is part of the Hawkesbury-Nepean catchment, is located in the Central Tablelands of New South Wales, Australia.

== Course ==
The Colo River rises on the Great Dividing Range, northeast of Newnes, formed by the confluence of the Wolgan River and the Capertee River, which respectively drain the Wolgan and Capertee Valleys north of Lithgow. Colo River flows eastwards and then south through a deep gorge in the northern section of the Blue Mountains. The majority of the river lies in Wollemi National Park. The middle Colo is inaccessible, rugged and remote. The wilderness was saved from development, logging and damming in the late 1970s by the Colo Committee and other environmentalists. Emerging from the wilderness region, the lower part of the Colo River flows through a scenic, narrow agricultural valley and reaches the Hawkesbury River at Lower Portland north of Windsor. Tributaries of the Colo include the Capertee River, Wolgan River, Wollangambe River and Wollemi Creek. The river descends 214 metres (702 ft) over its 86-kilometre (53 mi) course.

At Colo, the river is crossed by the Putty Road (B84).

Parts of the area surrounding the river, including both the Blue Mountains National Park and the Wollemi National Park have received World Heritage listing, due in part to the discovery of the Wollemi Pine, often described as a 'living fossil' from the age of the dinosaurs. The Colo River gorge contains many boulder-rapids that alternate with deep pools. Even though this area is relatively close to the Sydney metropolitan area, the Colo River flows through the largest wilderness area in New South Wales. Local volunteer bush regeneration groups such as the "Friends of the Colo" have been helping eradicate invasive exotic weeds in the area surrounding the river.

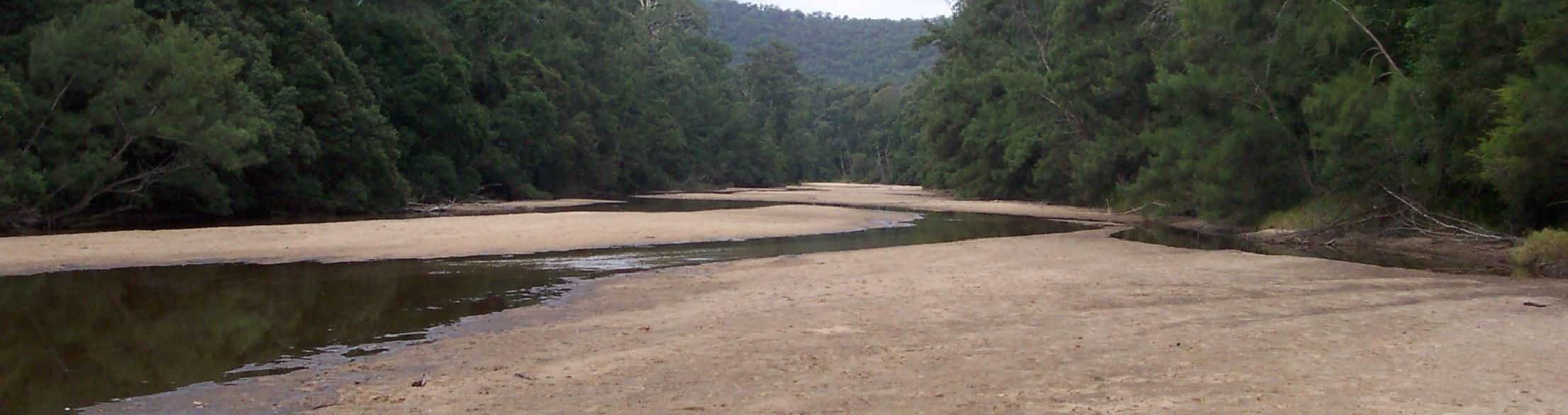
The Colo River under low-water conditions at Upper Colo.

== History ==
The traditional custodians of the land surrounding the Colo River are the Australian Aboriginal peoples of the Dharug and Darkinjung nations.

The area of the lower Colo River was first explored by Europeans in June 1789 by Governor Phillip. Settlement commenced there from the early 1800s via land grants. However, the first recorded European exploration of the forty kilometres of rugged gorge further upstream did not occur until 1831-33, when surveyor Frederick D'Arcy was tasked with mapping the area. In the 1880s it was proposed to build a railway line up the river, and its tributary the Capertee River, as an alternative to the established line over the Blue Mountains. A survey track was built all the way up the river, but the plan was abandoned.

== Recreation ==
Bushwalking, canoeing, packrafting, fishing, and accommodation retreats are all popular recreation activities along various parts of the Colo River.

== See also ==
- List of rivers of Australia
- List of rivers of New South Wales (A–K)
- Rivers of New South Wales
