= Wollangambe River =

Coordinates: 33°29′00″S 150°26′00″E

Wollangambe Wollangambe Creek
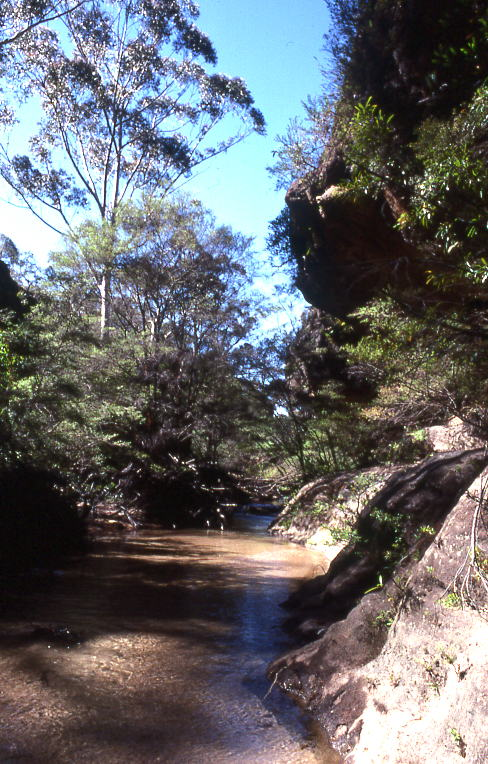
- Wollangambe River in the Blue Mountains, 2008.

Location
- Country: Australia
- State: New South Wales
- Region: Sydney Basin (IBRA), Greater Blue Mountains Area
- Local government areas: Lithgow, Blue Mountains

Physical characteristics
- Source: Great Dividing Range
  - location: near Newnes Junction
  - elevation: 924 m (3,031 ft)
- Mouth: confluence with the Colo River
  - location: west of Colo Heights
  - elevation: 55 m (180 ft)
- Length: 57 km (35 mi)

Basin features
- River system: Hawkesbury–Nepean catchment
- Tributaries
  - left: Bungleboori Creek, Nayook Creek
  - right: Bowens Creek
- National parks: Wollemi NP, Blue Mountains NP

The Wollangambe River, an Australian perennial river that is part of the Hawkesbury–Nepean catchment within the Sydney Basin, is located in the Greater Blue Mountains Area of New South Wales.

== Course and features ==
The Wollangambe River rises about 1 kilometre (0.62 mi) southeast of Happy Valley Springs, below Newnes Junction and within the Great Dividing Range. The river flows generally east and then north northeast, joined by three minor tributaries, mainly through rugged country that comprises Wollemi and Blue Mountains national parks. The river reaches its confluence with the Colo River west of Parsons Forest, near Colo Heights. The river descends 869 metres (2,851 ft) over its 57-kilometre (35 mi) course.

== Environmental damage ==
Centennial Coal has been dumping mine effluent into the Wollangambe River for approximately 30 years, effectively killing large sections of it.

In 2015, Centennial Coal released large amounts of coal fines into the Wollangambe River and World Heritage listed areas of the Blue Mountains National Park.

== See also ==
- List of rivers of Australia
- List of rivers of New South Wales (L–Z)
- Rivers of New South Wales
