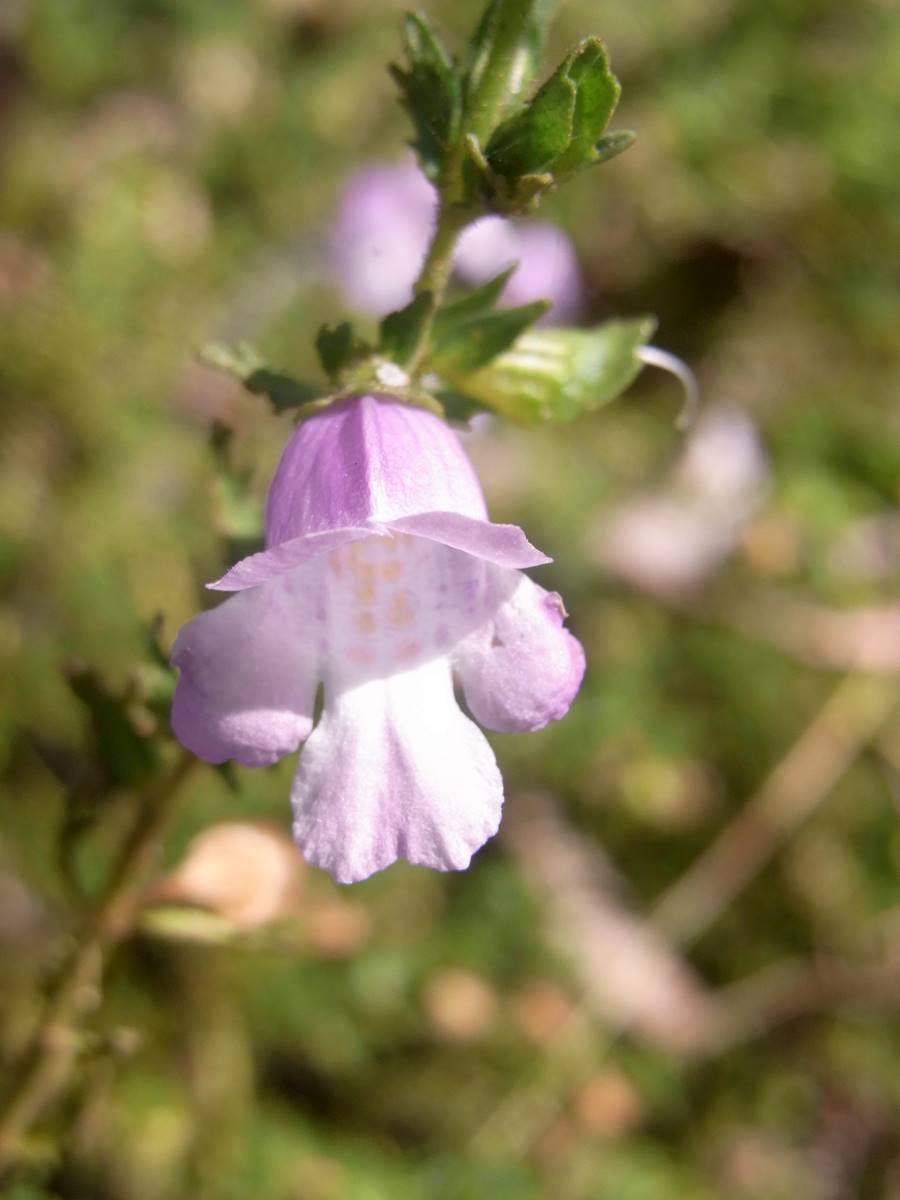
- In Burrendong Botanic Garden

Conservation status
- Vulnerable (EPBC Act)

Scientific classification
- Kingdom: Plantae
- Clade: Tracheophytes
- Clade: Angiosperms
- Clade: Eudicots
- Clade: Asterids
- Order: Lamiales
- Family: Lamiaceae
- Genus: Prostanthera
- Species: P. cryptandroides

Binomial name
- Prostanthera cryptandroides A.Cunn. ex Benth.
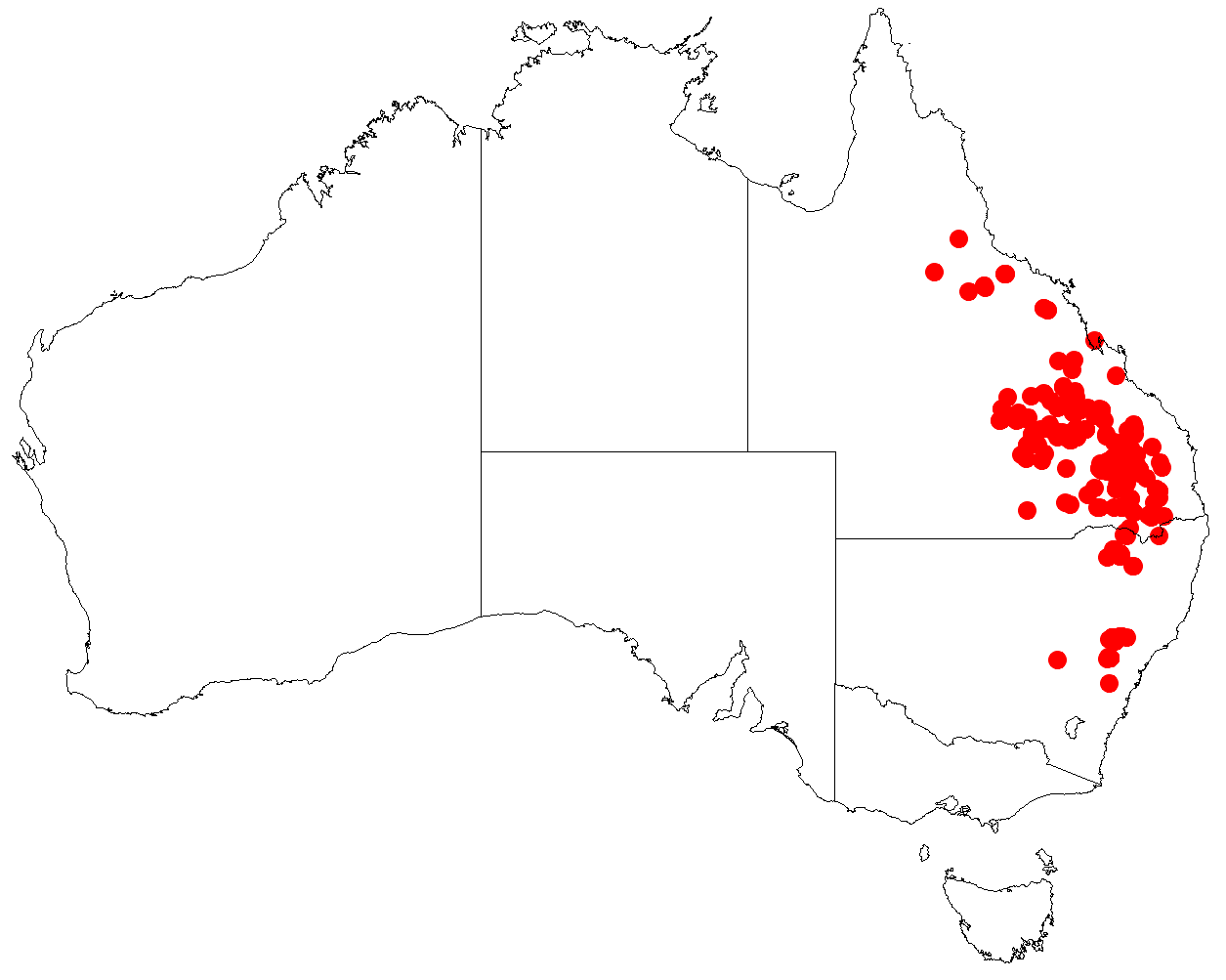
- Occurrence data from AVH

Synonyms
- Prostanthera odoratissima Benth.

= Prostanthera cryptandroides =

Species of flowering plant

Prostanthera cryptandroides is a species of flowering plant in the family Lamiaceae and is endemic to eastern Australia. It is a low, spreading shrub with narrow egg-shaped leaves and lilac to mauve flowers arranged singly in leaf axils.

== Description ==
Prostanthera cryptandroides is a low, spreading, strongly aromatic shrub, the branches with spreading hairs as well as glandular hairs. The leaves are pale green, narrow egg-shaped, 6–9 mm (0.24–0.35 in) long, 2–3 mm (0.079–0.118 in) wide and sessile or on a petiole up to 1 mm (0.039 in) long. The flowers are tube-shaped and arranged in upper leaf axils near the ends of branchlets. There are bracteoles 4–5 mm (0.16–0.20 in) long at the base of the flower, but that fall off as the flower develops. The sepals are 6–7 mm (0.24–0.28 in) long and form a tube 3–4 mm (0.12–0.16 in) long with two lobes, the upper 3–4 mm (0.12–0.16 in) long. The petals are lilac to mauve and 11–15 mm (0.43–0.59 in) long. Flowering occurs from September to April.

== Taxonomy ==
Prostanthera cryptandroides was first formally described in 1834 by George Bentham from an unpublished description by Allan Cunningham and the description was published in Bentham's book Labiatarum Genera et Species from specimens collected by Cunningham near the Hunter River.

In 1999, Barry Conn described two subspecies of P. cryptandroides in the journal Telopea and the names are accepted by the Australian Plant Census:

- Prostanthera cryptandroides A.Cunn. ex Benth. subsp. cryptandroides (commonly known as the Wollemi mint-bush) has branches and sepals without stalked glandular hairs;
- Prostanthera cryptandroides subsp. euphrasioides(Benth.) B.J.Conn has stalked glandular hairs on the branches and sepals.

== Distribution and habitat ==
This mint bush grows in forest, often in rocky places and is found from the Leichhardt region of north Queensland to northern New South Wales. Wollemi mint-bush has a restricted distribution between the Lithgow and Sandy Hollow districts of New South Wales. Populations of subsp. cryptandroides occur within the Wollemi and Gardens of Stone National Parks.

== Conservation status ==
Subspecies eudesmioides is classified as of "least concern" in Queensland. Subspecies cryptandroides is listed as "vulnerable" under the Australian Government Environment Protection and Biodiversity Conservation Act 1999 and the New South Wales Government Biodiversity Conservation Act 2016. The main threats to this subspecies are habitat loss, trampling and grazing, inappropriate fire regimes and weed invasion.
