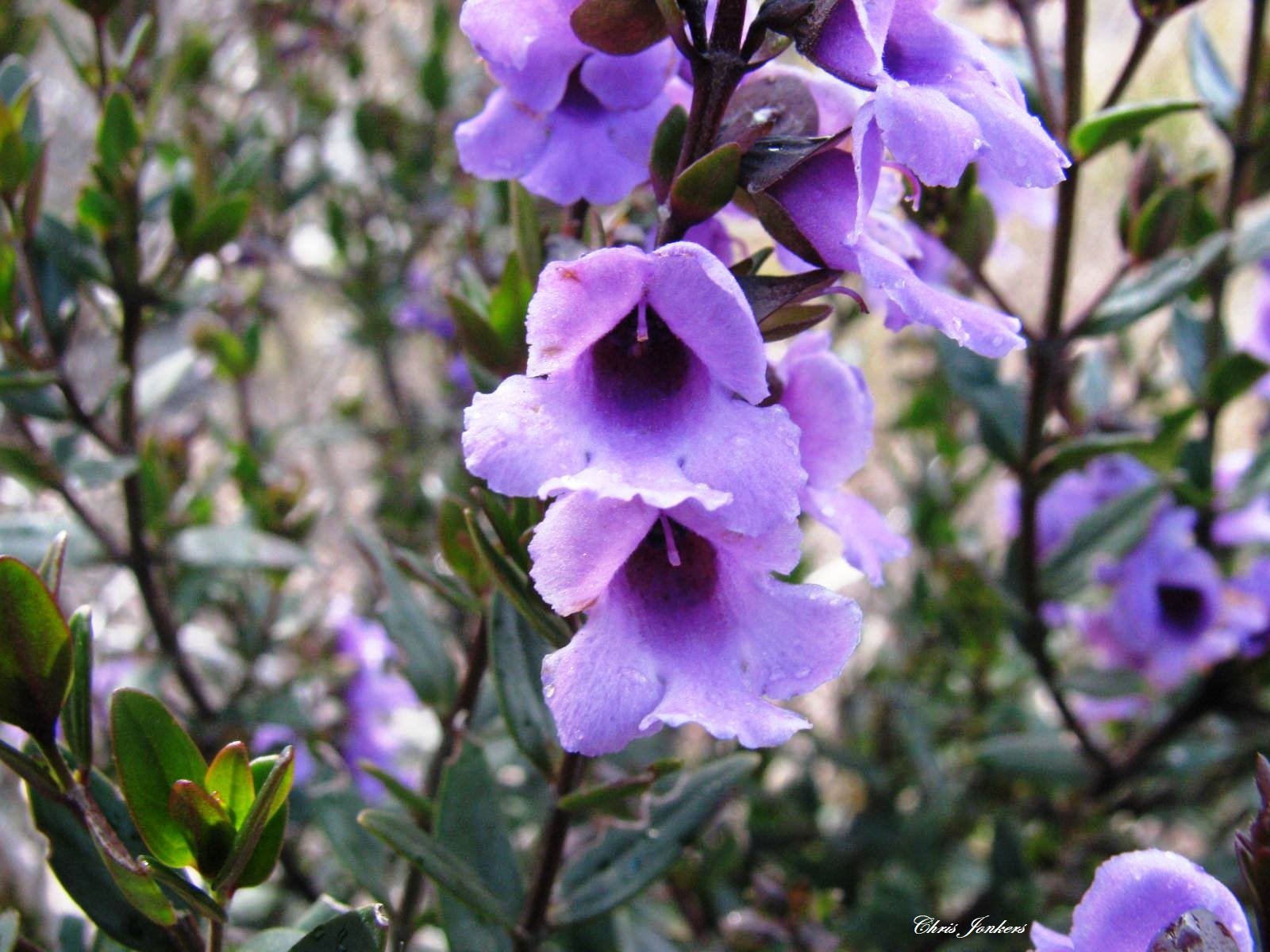
- In the Wolgan Valley

Scientific classification
- Kingdom: Plantae
- Clade: Tracheophytes
- Clade: Angiosperms
- Clade: Eudicots
- Clade: Asterids
- Order: Lamiales
- Family: Lamiaceae
- Genus: Prostanthera
- Species: P. hindii

Binomial name
- Prostanthera hindii B.J.Conn
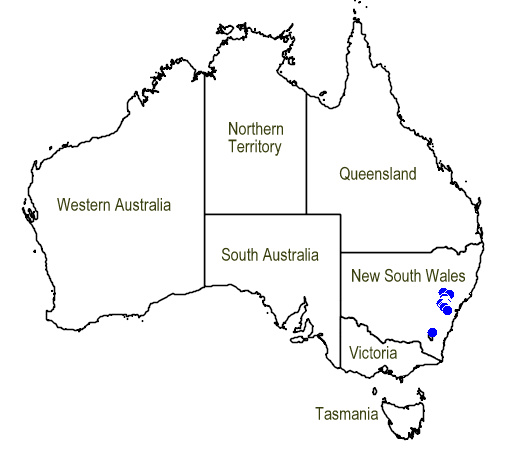
- Occurrence data from AVH

= Prostanthera hindii =

Species of flowering plant

Prostanthera hindii is a species of flowering plant in the family Lamiaceae and is endemic to the Central Tablelands of New South Wales. It is a small, erect shrub with densely hairy branches, egg-shaped leaves, and mauve flowers with deep mauve to dark purple colouration inside the petal tube.

== Description ==
Prostanthera hindii is an erect shrub that typically grows to a height of 0.3–1 m (1 ft 0 in – 3 ft 3 in) and has densely hairy, densely glandular branchlets. The leaves are dark green above, paler below, almost glabrous, egg-shaped to narrow egg-shaped, 15–25 mm (0.59–0.98 in) long and 4–8 mm (0.16–0.31 in) wide on a petiole 1–2 mm (0.039–0.079 in) long. The flowers are arranged singly in four to ten upper leaf axils with bracteoles about 3–5.5 mm (0.12–0.22 in) long at the base. The sepals are maroon and form a tube 2.5–3 mm (0.098–0.118 in) wide with two lobes, the lower lobe about 4 mm (0.16 in) long and wide and the upper lobe about 5 mm (0.20 in) long and wide. The petals are mauve and 10–14 mm (0.39–0.55 in) long forming a tube 5–7 mm (0.20–0.28 in) long with deep mauve to dark purple colouration inside the tube. The central lower lobe is broadly spatula-shaped, 5.5–6.5 mm (0.22–0.26 in) long and 4–6.5 mm (0.16–0.26 in) wide, the side lobes 5–5.5 mm (0.20–0.22 in) long and 4–5 mm (0.16–0.20 in) wide. The upper lobe is broadly egg-shaped, about 5 mm (0.20 in) long and 7 mm (0.28 in) wide. Flowering mainly occurs from Spring to early summer.

== Taxonomy and naming ==
Prostanthera hindii was first formally described in 1997 by Barry Conn in the journal Telopea. The specific epithet (hindii) honours Peter Hind, who, with Barry Conn, collected the type material.

== Distribution and habitat ==
This mint bush grows in Eucalyptus woodland with a shrubby understorey and is confined to the Central Tablelands of New South Wales.
