= Wolgan Valley =

Small valley in New South Wales

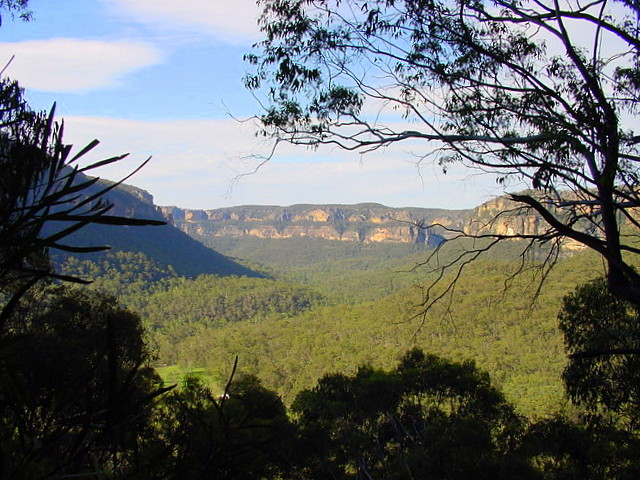
- Area: 36.0 square miles (93 km^{2})

Geography
- Location: Australia, New South Wales, Lithgow
- Coordinates: 33.2464°S 150.1597°E
- Interactive map of Wolgan Valley

Wolgan Valley is a small valley located along the Wolgan River in the Lithgow Region of New South Wales, Australia. The valley is located approximately 32 kilometres (20 mi) north of Lithgow and 150 kilometres north-west of Sydney. Accessible by the Wolgan Valley Discovery Trail (Wolgan Road) from the Castlereagh Highway, the road travels through the valley leading onto the historical village of Newnes and its extensive industrial ruins.

== Description and history ==
Wolgan Valley is formed by the Wolgan River in rugged mountainous country west of Sydney in Lithgow north of the city. It flows broadly east until it joins the Capertee River, after which it becomes the Colo River. The latter then continues east through the 361,000-hectare (890,000-acre) Wollemi Wilderness which is the largest wilderness area in New South Wales and the largest in eastern Australia. The Wolgan Valley includes sections of Wollemi National Park, Gardens of Stone National Park and the UNESCO declared Greater Blue Mountains World Heritage Area.

The valley was inhabited by Aboriginal Australians for thousands of years, but the First European settlement occurred around 1823, when brothers William and James Walker used the valley as an outstation for their Wallerawang property "Wallerowang". It is best known for its historic railway tunnel and the former Commonwealth Oil Corporation shale oil mining operations at Newnes.

The Railway tunnel formed part of a 50-kilometre (31 mi) heavy-haul line between Newnes and Newnes junction on the main western railway. Four heavy Shay type locomotives were used to haul the products of the works at Newnes up grades as steep as 1 in 25.

The name of the Wolgan Valley is derived from "wolga", a local Australian Aboriginal language name for the climbing plant, Clematis aristata, found in coastal regions of the South-East states of Australia.

Within the Wolgan Valley there are several significant Aboriginal sacred sites. These include Maiyingu Marragu (Blackfellows Hands) which is a collection of Aboriginal hand stencils located near Wolgan Gap, and several Aboriginal burial sites.

The bush walking trails in the area include the Pipeline Track, which goes from Newnes to Glen Davis, and the Wolgan Valley Heritage Trail (see links below), as well as the track from Newnes to the Glowworm Tunnel. There are also camping grounds that are open to the public. The valley also contains numerous slot canyons and is popular for rockclimbing.

Commercial tourism came to the valley in 2009 in the form of the Wolgan Valley Resort and Spa. This project was opened by Emirates Groups Hotels and Resorts after examining several sites in Australia.
