= Wolgan River =

River in New South Wales, Australia

Wolgan
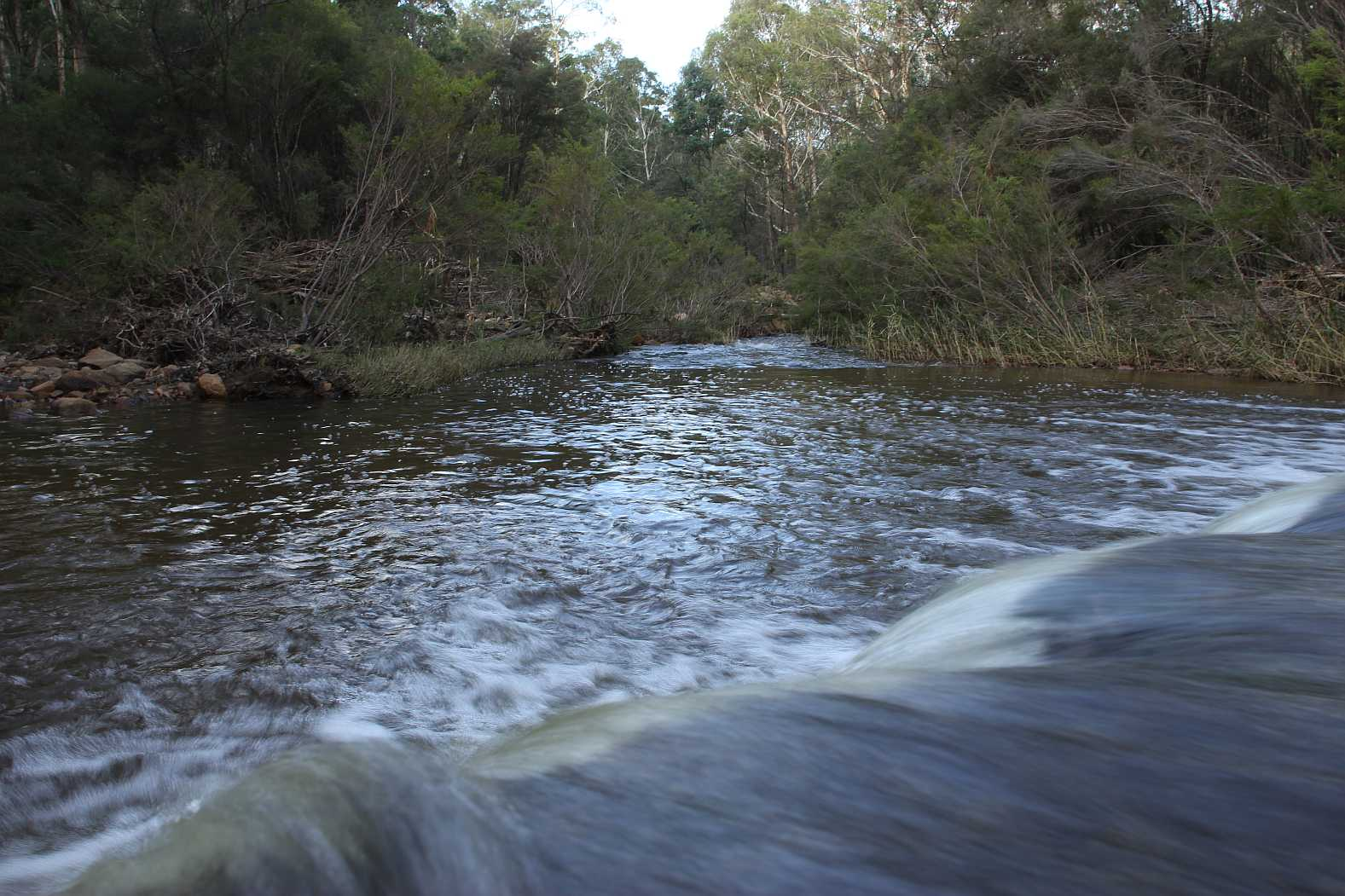
- Wolgan River, near Newnes

Location
- Country: Australia
- State: New South Wales
- IBRA: Sydney Basin
- District: Central Tablelands
- Local government area: Lithgow

Physical characteristics
- Source: Great Dividing Range
  - location: northeast of Wallerawang
  - coordinates: 33°22′55″S 150°09′37″E
  - elevation: 1,070 m (3,510 ft)
- Source confluence: Carne Creek and Wolgan River (Western Branch)
  - location: Wolgan Valley
  - coordinates: 33°14′53″S 150°11′48″E
  - elevation: 550 m (1,800 ft)
- Mouth: confluence with the Capertee River
  - location: below Mount Morgan, east of Glen Davis
  - coordinates: 33°12′20″S 150°27′54″E
  - elevation: 178 m (584 ft)
- Length: 40 km (25 mi)

Basin features
- River system: Hawkesbury-Nepean catchment
- National park: Wollemi National Park

The Wolgan River, a watercourse of the Hawkesbury-Nepean catchment, is located in the Central Tablelands region of New South Wales, Australia.

== Course and features ==
Formed by the confluence of Carne Creek (also called Wolgan River (Eastern Branch)) and Wolgan River (Western Branch), the headwaters of the Wolgan River rise on the eastern slopes of the Great Dividing Range, northeast of Wallerawang, near Lithgow, and flows generally north by west, north, northeast, east northeast, southeast by east, and northeast by east before reaching its confluence with the Capertee River, below Mount Morgan, east of Glen Davis. The river descends 897 metres (2,943 ft) over its 63-kilometre (39 mi) course.

The majority of the river lies within Wollemi National Park; flows through the Wolgan Valley; past the deserted settlement of Newnes; and is contained within the Greater Blue Mountains Area UNESCO World Heritage Site.

== See also ==
- List of rivers of Australia
- List of rivers of New South Wales (L–Z)
- Rivers of New South Wales
