= Capertee Valley =

Valley in New South Wales, Australia

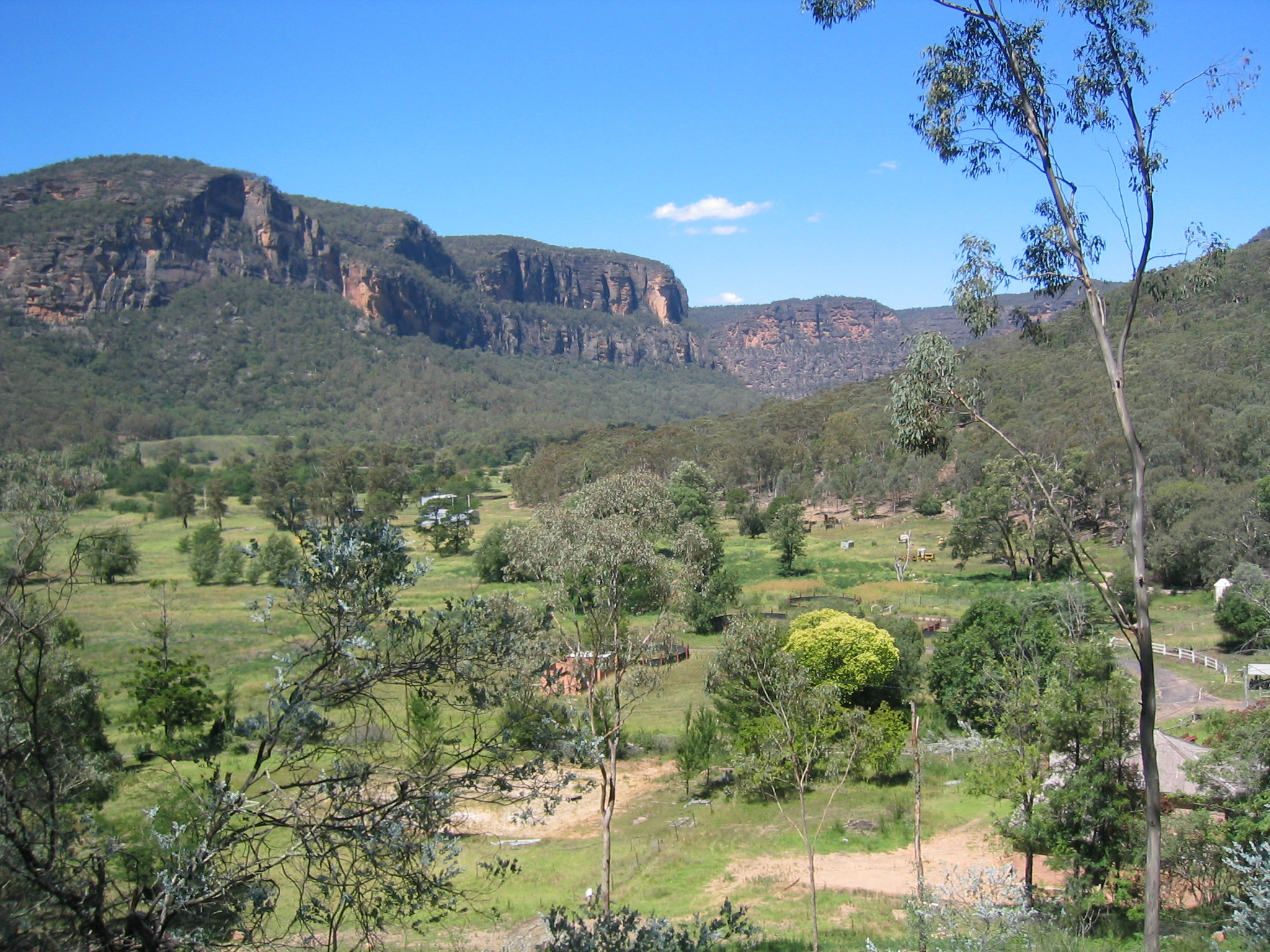
- View from the southern side of the valley
- Width: 30 km (19 mi)
- Depth: 1.6 km (1 mi)

Geology
- Age: Triassic

Geography
- Location: New South Wales, Australia
- Population centers: Glen Davis
- Borders on: South Eastern Highlands
- Coordinates: 33°2′54″S 150°8′4″E
- Topo map: Wallerawang 8931 (1:100000)
- Traversed by: James Blackman
- Interactive map of Capertee Valley

The Capertee Valley (pronounced Kay-per-tee) is a large canyon in New South Wales, Australia, 135 km (84 mi) north-west of Sydney that is noted to be the widest canyon in the world, exceeding the Grand Canyon. It is located 135 km (84 mi) kilometres north-west of Sydney, between Lithgow and Mudgee, in the Central Tablelands, just above the Blue Mountains.

The only population centre of any kind is the village of Glen Davis, which includes a camp-site and often serves as a starting point for bushwalks around the Capertee River and other parts of the Wollemi National Park.

== Geology ==
The valley follows the Capertee River as it cuts through the Sydney Basin, a sedimentary basin consisting of Permian and Triassic sedimentary rock west of the Blue Mountains. Sandstone cliffs and limestone formations predominate the escarpment, which descend into a deep chasm sculpted into the environment over millions of years.

One of the most prominent features of the valley is Pantony's Crown, a sandstone butte that is now part of the Gardens of Stone National Park. Capertee Valley is 1 kilometre wider than the Grand Canyon, but not as deep.

== History ==
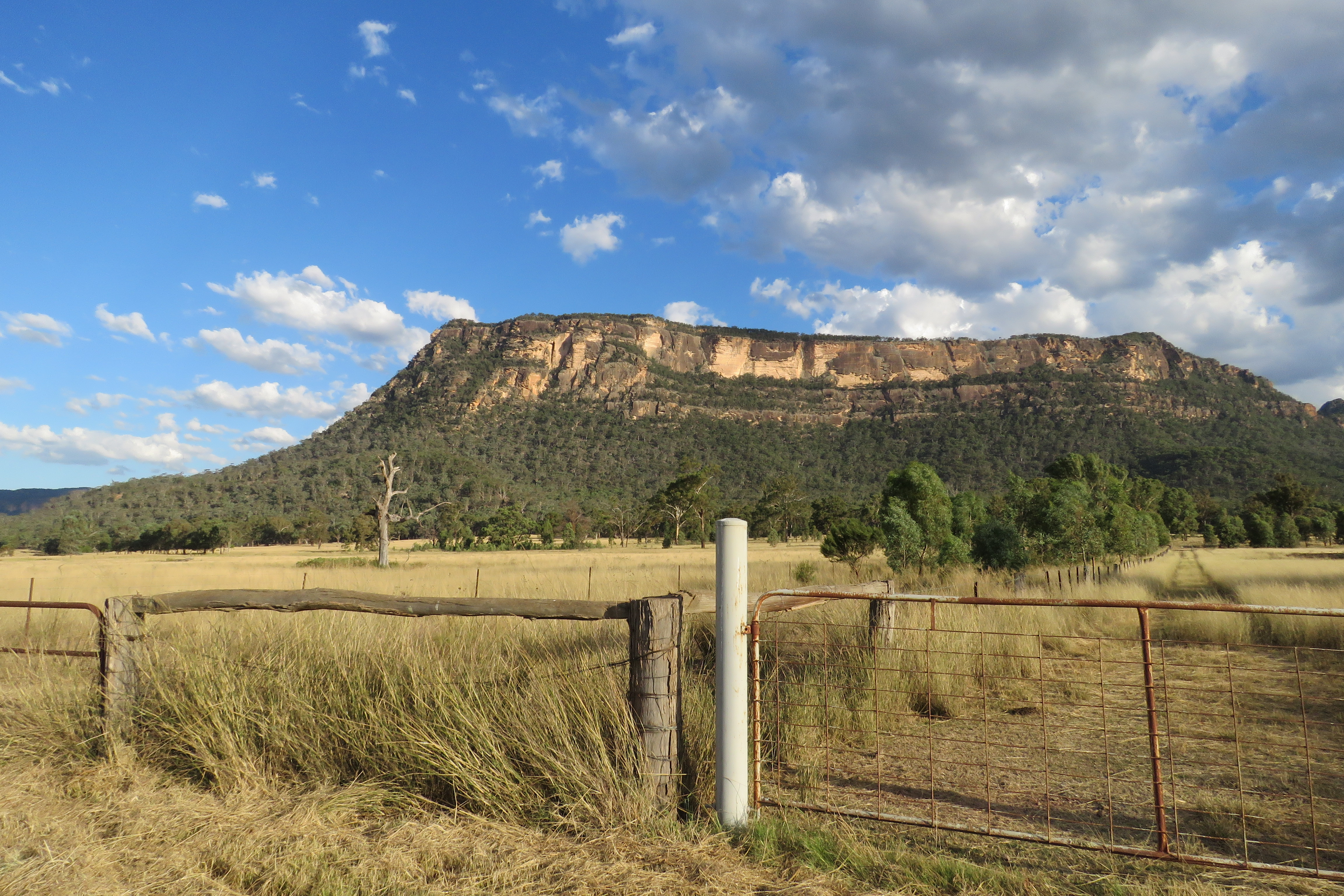
Farmland with a sandstone cliff in background.

=== Aboriginal ===
The original inhabitants of the land surrounding the valley are the Aboriginal Wiradjuri people, as shown by the 2,000-year-old rock art in the area which feature stencilled hands, boomerangs and throwing sticks.

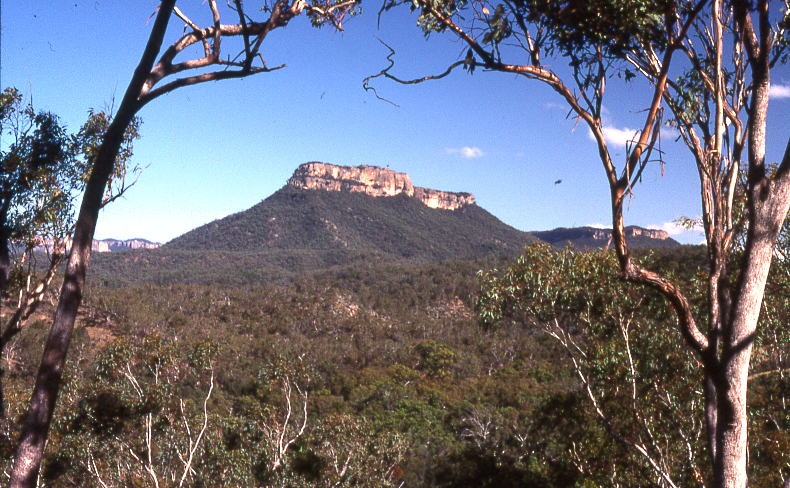
Pantony's Crown

=== European ===
The canyon was first crossed by English explorer James Blackman in 1821. In the 1840s, sheep farming in the area produced quality wool. The area is patterned with old bush tracks, bridle paths and dray tracks from Nulla Mountain to Putty. From 1851, the Australian gold rush increased the colony's population where the Capertee Village developed from small accommodation inns. The area's wealth and value grew as coal, shale-oil and limestone were discovered and mined there.

In 1882, the railway was established, in addition to new homes, inns, a post office and the Glen Davis Shale Oil Works, a shale oil extraction. The village became a rest stop for travellers to Mudgee due to the good water supply in the area. Henry Lawson mentions the valley in his 1891 poem Song of the Old Bullock Driver. In 1920s, bushrangers hid their stolen cattle in the valley. The valley gained importance in the 1930s for its immense geological deposits that laid beneath it and an art deco hotel was constructed.

== Birds ==
The valley is classified by BirdLife International as an Important Bird Area because it is the most important breeding site for the endangered regent honeyeater. It also supports populations of the painted honeyeater, rockwarbler, swift parrot, plum-headed finch and diamond firetail.

In the US published book Fifty Places to Go Birding Before You Die, author Chris Santella lists Capertee Valley as one of only two locations in Australia selected in his top 50 world bird watching locations.

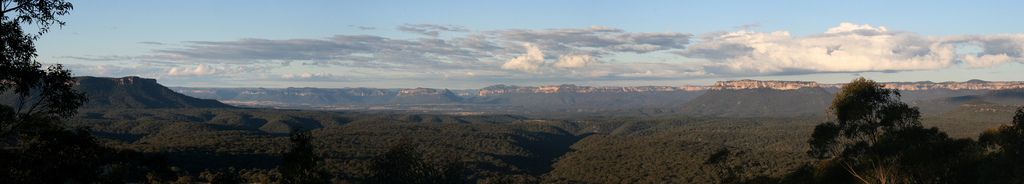
Panoramic view of the Capertee Valley

== Literary references ==
Henry Lawson refers to "the wild beauty" of the Capertee area in his poem 'Song of the Old Bullock-Driver', written in 1891 and published in Verses, Popular and Humorous (1900). The lines read:

We saw the wild beauty of Capertee Valley,

As slowly we rounded the base of the Crown.

"The Crown" is a reference to Blackman's Crown, a prominent outcrop on the Crown Ridge south of Capertee village, named after the explorer and pastoralist James Blackman.

In June 1874 an anonymous writer provided the following description of the view at sunrise on the road which winds around the Crown Ridge:

I enjoyed the fresh bracing air at the Crown, and the next morning was up at sunrise. A little over a mile from the hotel the road winds round the Crown Ridge, and as I ascended there opened to view a truly marvellous picture. To those who love the glories of light and shade, of boundless extent, magnificence of scenery, beauty and sublimity, I would recommend a view at sunrise or sunset over the valley of Capertee. Along the lowest range or tiers of hills, a thousand feet below there is a sombre shade; higher up a lighter tinge almost approaching green; and then above the great peaks the natural towers of rocks and battlement stretching miles away are gloriously bathed in golden sheen.

== See also ==
- Ben Bullen
- Blue Mountains National Park
- Cullen Bullen
- Gardens of Stone National Park
- Turon National Park
- Wollemi National Park
- Jamison Valley
