= Capertee River =

Coordinates: 33°12′S 150°28′E

Capertee Bogee River

Location
- Country: Australia
- State: New South Wales
- Region: Sydney Basin (IBRA), Central Tablelands
- Municipalities: Mid-Western Regional, Lithgow

Physical characteristics
- Source: Brymair Creek
- Source confluence: Tea Tree Creek
  - location: near Bogee, southeast of Kandos
  - elevation: 510 m (1,670 ft)
- Mouth: confluence with the Wolgan River to form the Colo River
  - location: northeast of Newnes
  - elevation: 147 m (482 ft)
- Length: 105 km (65 mi)

Basin features
- River system: Hawkesbury-Nepean catchment
- National park: Wollemi NP

The Capertee River, a perennial stream that is part of the Hawkesbury-Nepean catchment, is located in the Central Tablelands region of New South Wales, Australia.

== Course ==
The Capertee River rises on the Great Dividing Range, close to Bogee, southeast of Kandos, formed by the confluence of the Tea Tree Creek and Brymair Creek, and flows through the Capertee Valley, generally to the south, east, and southeast, joined by seven minor tributaries, to its confluence with Wolgan River to form the Colo River, northeast of Newnes. The river descends 363 metres (1,191 ft) over its 105-kilometre (65 mi) course.

== See also ==
- List of rivers of Australia
- List of rivers of New South Wales (A–K)
- Rivers of New South Wales
- Wollemi National Park
