= Gardens of Stone National Park =

National park in Australia

- IUCN category II (national park)
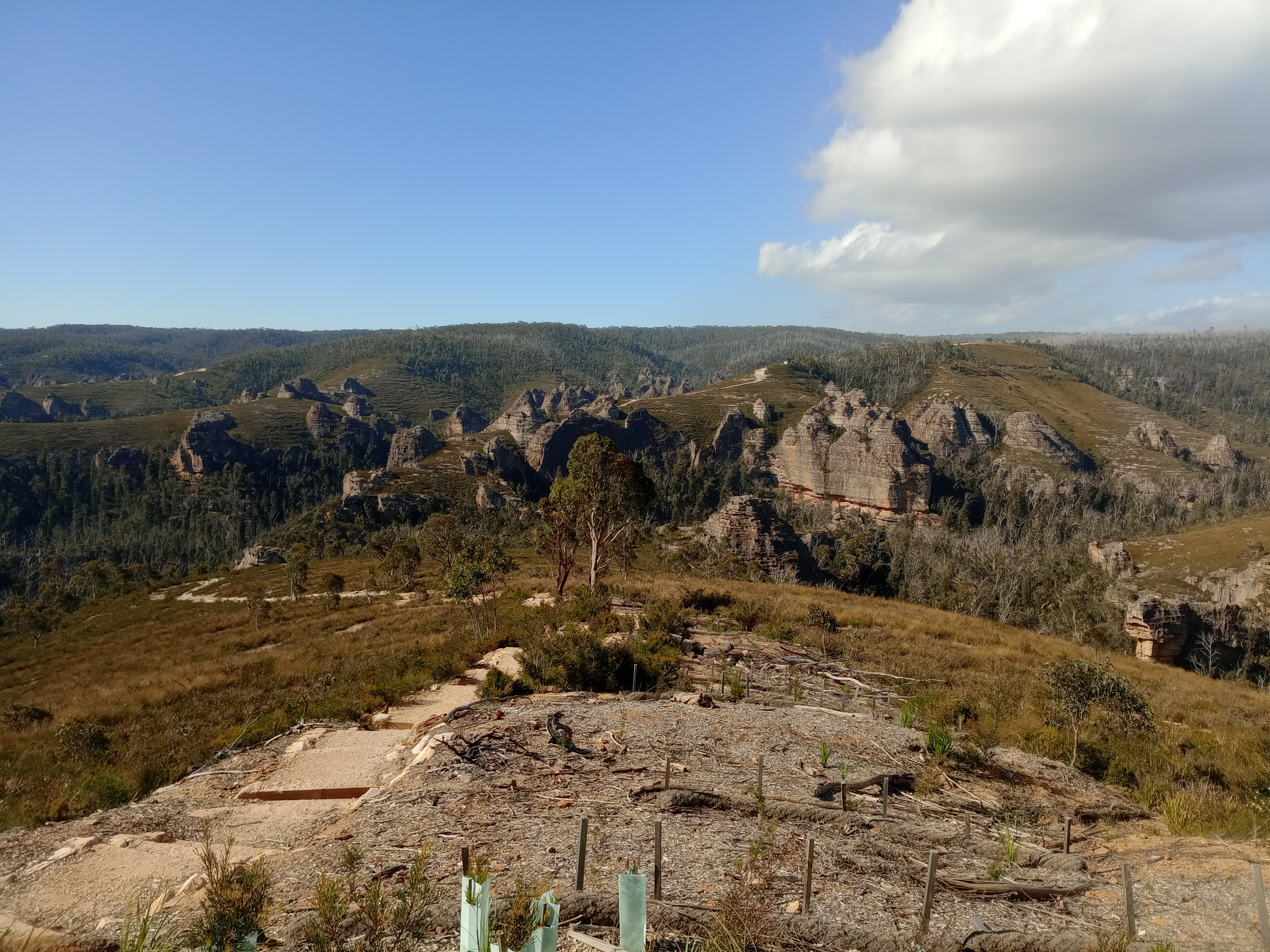
- The Lost City pagodas within the national park

- Location within New South Wales
- Location: New South Wales
- Nearest city: Lithgow
- Coordinates: 33°9′16.6″S 150°2′27.5″E
- Area: 150.8 km^{2} (58.2 sq mi)
- Established: 30 November 1994
- Governing body: NSW National Parks & Wildlife Service
- Website: Official website

The Gardens of Stone National Park is a protected national park in the Central Tablelands region of New South Wales in eastern Australia. The 15,080-hectare (37,300-acre) national park is situated 125 kilometres (78 mi) northwest of Sydney, and 30 kilometres (19 mi) northwest of Lithgow. The national park draws its name from the natural stone pagodas within its boundaries.

The Gardens of Stone National Park is one of the eight protected areas that, in 2000, was inscribed to form part of the UNESCO World Heritage-listed Greater Blue Mountains Area. The national park forms part of the Great Dividing Range.

== Features and location ==
The most prominent features of the park are the sandstone pagoda landscapes and cliffs and canyons. Limestone outcrops, karsts and elevated swamps are other unusual features.

The park is bounded on the west by the Castlereagh Highway; to the north by the Glen Davis Road; to the east by the Wollemi National Park; and to the south by the Newnes State Forest, the Wolgan Valley, and the Wolgan State Forest. The rural localities of Capertee, Ben Bullen, and Glen Davis are located on the edge of the national park.

== History ==
The Newnes Plateau region was proposed for conservation in 1932 as part of a Greater Blue Mountains National Park by the National Parks and Primitive Areas Council. Lobbying for protecting the area increased after the establishment of Wollemi National Park in 1979. The National Parks Association proposed its extension westwards in 1984, which developed into a detailed proposal of an 18,030-hectare (44,600-acre) park in 1993, which was ultimately successful. The Gardens of Stone National Park was established in 1994; however, the initial park only covered 11,780 hectares (29,100 acres), omitting areas which contain coal deposits. It was later enlarged to 15,080 hectares (37,300 acres). Environmentalist groups seek to protect more of the surrounding area, which includes pagodas, canyons, heathland and elevated swamps.

== Flora and fauna ==
A total of 423 native plant species have been recorded in the park in 30 different plant communities. Most of the park is covered in open forest or woodland dominated by eucalypts. In the west of the park, there are ironbark (Eucalyptus fibrosa and E. crebra) and yellow box (Eucalyptus melliodora) woodlands that grow on clay loam and are a habitat for the rare regent honeyeater and turquoise parrot. There is white box (Eucalyptus albens) woodland in the southwest and scribbly gum (Eucalyptus rossii and E. sparsifolia) woodland on the park's eastern borders.

The plant and animal communities of the pagoda formations are fragile and easily irreversibly damaged by human activity. Collection of bush rocks for gardens and landscaping removes habitat for reptiles.

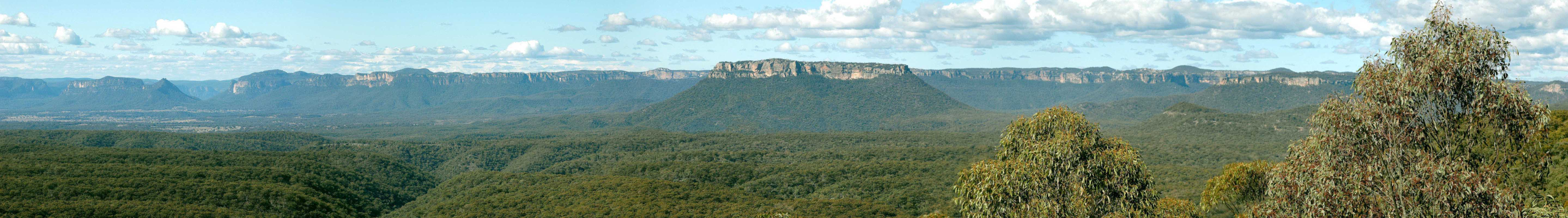
A view of the Capertee Valley, covering parts of the Gardens of Stone National Park, seen from Pearsons Lookout. The flat-topped formation in the centre is Pantony's Crown.

== See also ==
- Protected areas of New South Wales
