= Glen Davis, New South Wales =

Glen Davis
- Town
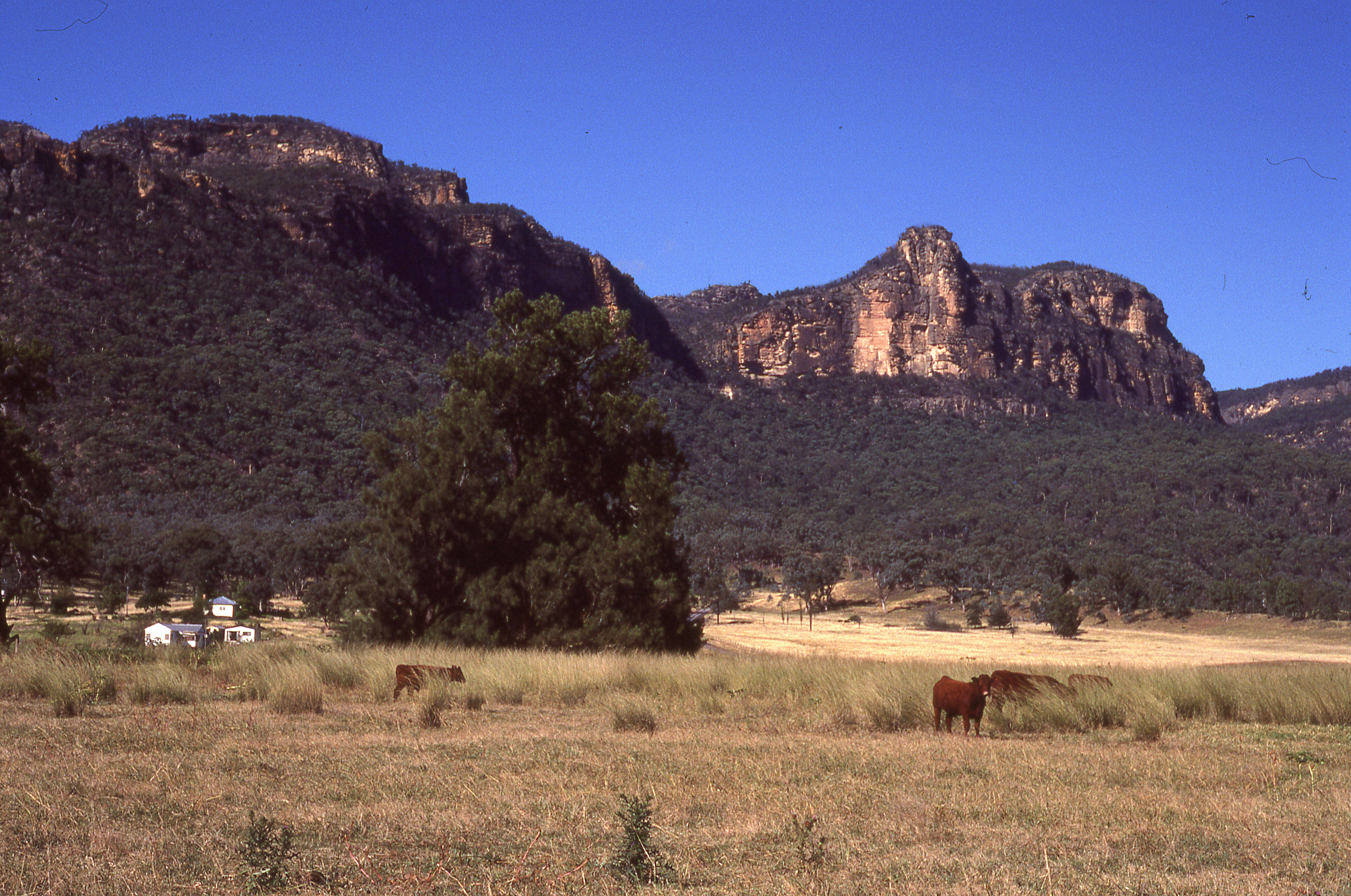
- Countryside around Glen Davis

- Interactive map of Glen Davis
- Coordinates: 33°07′26″S 150°16′54″E
- Country: Australia
- State: New South Wales
- LGA: City of Lithgow
- Location: 200 km (120 mi) NW of Sydney; 80 km (50 mi) N of Lithgow; 110 km (68 mi) SE of Mudgee

Government
  - State electorate: Bathurst
  - Federal division: Calare
- Elevation: 290 m (950 ft)

Population
  - Total: 115 (2016 census)
- Postcode: 2846
Localities around Glen Davis
Glen Alice		Wollemi N.P.
Capertee	Glen Davis	Wollemi National Park
Gardens of Stone National Park	Newnes	Wollemi N.P.

Glen Davis is a village in the Central Tablelands of New South Wales, Australia. The village is located in the local government area of the City of Lithgow. It is located 250 km north-west of Sydney and approximately 80 kilometres north of Lithgow. The name is also applied to the surrounding area, for postal and statistical purposes. In the 2006 census, Glen Davis had a population of 354 but this fell to 115 in the 2016 census, and declined still further to 106 at the 2021 census.

== Location ==
Glen Davis is situated in the Capertee Valley, from which the Capertee River flows. Glen Davis is located north of Lithgow, New South Wales, off the road to Mudgee. It lies just to the east of the Great Dividing Range, as the Capertee River is part of the Hawkesbury-Nepean river system. The nearest other town is Capertee, which formerly had the closest connection to Glen Davis by rail.

Its location was due originally to the presence of deposits of oil shale and coal nearby. Disadvantages of Glen Davis's location were its relative remoteness, its relatively low rainfall, and, paradoxically, that the lower part of its site is subject to flooding during heavy rains.

== Climate ==
Climate data for Glen Davis(The Gullies), coordinates:33°12′S 150°25′E
Month	Jan	Feb	Mar	Apr	May	Jun	Jul	Aug	Sep	Oct	Nov	Dec	Year
Mean daily maximum °C (°F)	30.3 (86.5)	28.9 (84.0)	27.1 (80.8)	22.7 (72.9)	19.1 (66.4)	15.7 (60.3)	15.4 (59.7)	17.2 (63.0)	21.1 (70.0)	24.0 (75.2)	26.9 (80.4)	29.3 (84.7)	23.1 (73.7)
Mean daily minimum °C (°F)	16.5 (61.7)	16.6 (61.9)	13.8 (56.8)	9.2 (48.6)	5.8 (42.4)	4.1 (39.4)	2.0 (35.6)	3.0 (37.4)	5.7 (42.3)	9.1 (48.4)	12.2 (54.0)	14.5 (58.1)	9.4 (48.9)
Average rainfall mm (inches)	70.2 (2.76)	72.7 (2.86)	47.2 (1.86)	43.9 (1.73)	39.2 (1.54)	58.4 (2.30)	39.9 (1.57)	47.5 (1.87)	36.8 (1.45)	57.5 (2.26)	60.2 (2.37)	60.6 (2.39)	634.1 (24.96)
Average rainy days (≥ 1mm)	5.3	6.2	4.4	4.3	4.0	5.8	4.8	5.3	4.7	6.1	5.0	4.7	60.6
Average relative humidity (%) (at 9 A.M.)	61	65	68	73	81	83	83	72	66	56	53	56	68
Source: Bureau of Meteorology(temperatures 1940-1952, rainfall 1940-1969)

== History ==
=== Before Glen Davis ===
==== Aboriginal and early settler history ====
The Wiradjuri people are the original inhabitants of the Capertee Valley and the location now known as Glen Davis. The valley is in the north-eastern corner of the traditional lands of the Wiradjiri, near the boundary with the Darkinyung lands.

European settlers colonised and took over land in the valley, beginning in the 1820s, and progressively cleared the land on the valley floor for grazing and European agriculture.

==== Early mining and North Newnes ====
In 1865, oil shale was found in the Capertee Valley, on both the northern and southern sides. It was first mined there in 1881, including from a adit in the southern side of the valley, known as 'MP1', which would many years later be the site of the Glen Davis shale mine.

During the early 20th-Century, a small settlement known as North Newnes existed in the Capertee Valley close to the portal of a tunnel that was being driven to connect the valley with the oil shale operations in the Wolgan Valley at Newnes (then also known as South Newnes). The two settlements were connected by a bridle track between the two valleys. The tunnel, known as 'Lang's Tunnel'—begun first in the 1890s—lay west of the later oil shale mine; it had a length of 4,300 ft (1,300 m), by the time that work on it was abandoned in September 1906. The miners had left the site by November 1908. The site of North Newnes was probably on higher ground above the future site Glen Davis township. Shale mining took place in the valley as late as 1923.

None of these early ventures produced significant amounts of shale, as getting the shale out of the remote valley for processing was not economic.

=== Shale oil town (1938–1952) ===
From 1938, the area adjacent to the site of Glen Davis became the centre of a revival of the oil shale industry. The town was established under an Act of the N.S.W. Parliament in December 1939. It was named after George Francis Davis. Glen Davis was notable because it was the first time that there had been an attempt in N.S.W. to create a completely new town based on town planning principles.

Construction of the Glen Davis Oil Shale Works began in 1938, before the town existed, and the earliest workers had to live in tents or otherwise make their own housing. This shanty housing often made use of white-washed hessian bagging and other inexpensive materials that were to hand, and the area became known at the 'Bag Town'. It was not within the neat planned township but on the opposite side of the Capertee River, on river flats prone to flooding. The settlement known as 'Glen Davis' thus came to consist of the planned town of Glen Davis, on the southern side of the river, the 'Bag Town' on the northern side, and a little to the east—between the town centre and the works, on land owned by National Oil Proprietary Limited—an area of staff and employee housing. There was also a planned industrial area to the north-west of the town centre.

The Glen Davis Oil Shale Works first made shale oil in January 1940. The post office for the town opened on 1 March 1939. The school opened in January 1940. Land sales in the town occurred in March 1940 but none of the residential sites were sold at the time. Conditions of sale for residential blocks were relaxed later in 1940. Houses later built there were financed and constructed under a cooperative building scheme, under which no deposit was required but equity was allocated based on the value of rental payments made.

In 1947, Glen Davis had a population of approximately 1,600, who were accommodated as follows: 11 substantial brick houses for staff; a staff hostel made of brick accommodating 30 junior staff; 100 permanent and 50 'war-type' individually-owned residences; a group of barracks with accommodation and boarding for 300 single men; a commercial hotel with 25 rooms; and a 'Bag Town' of 250 mostly sub-standard dwellings. The school had 260 pupils and 7 teachers. There was a post office, a bank and a police station. The town had a doctor, a pharmacist, three churches, a community centre, golf course, bowling green, children's playground and tennis courts. There were few commercial outlets; two general stores; a pharmacy; a garage; a 'saloon' (a bar separate from the hotel); a barber shop; and the hotel. There was also a motion-picture theatre in the 'Bag Town' section.

Driven by government policy and a shortage of labour for the shale oil operations, post-war migrants settled in the town from around 1948, facing hostility from some workers and residents.

At its peak, the population reached approximately 2000. There was an ambulance station, with two ambulances, that had been funded by the people of the town. There was also a bakery. From 1949, the town had a reticulated water supply. The water was piped over 105 km from the Oberon Dam on the Fish River, a rare instance of water from the Murray-Darling catchment being supplied to a location that is east of the Great Dividing Range. (While Glen Davis sits at the base of the western edge of the rugged Blue Mountains, the Great Dividing Range is to the west, is less rugged and lower than the Blue Mountains. The Great Dividing Range refers to the divide between waters that flow to the Pacific Ocean, and those that flow to the west, rather than the coastal or highest mountains.)

=== Decline ===
The works and the associated shale and coal mines were closed and abandoned, in May 1952, because the works was unprofitable and accumulated losses were approaching the value of the capital and advances involved. By late 1952, there were 50 vacant houses in the town. Home owners received some compensation from the Commonwealth Government. Equipment in the plant was auctioned off in early 1953, by which time the ambulance station had closed, the town was taking on a forlorn unkempt appearance, and the population had fallen to 460. There was some work available in dismantling parts of the shale oil works during 1953. By mid-1954, the population had fallen to 320, there were 80 empty houses, only three shops were left open— general merchant, butcher and newsagent— and the town had lost its doctor, police station and clergymen. What was left uninhabited was subject to damage by vandals and thieves from outside the town The population had dwindled to 195, by late 1954. The skeleton of a town survived in the form of some properties, a hotel, a post office, and a shop or two that operated intermittently. Many houses and other building in the town were either relocated or demolished; some others just decayed away over time. The school closed in February 1962. The post office closed on 1 October 1986.

== Present day Glen Davis ==
The creation of the Wollemi National Park brought a degree of tourism to the area and the ruins of the oil shale works are now also a minor tourist attraction. Some buildings associated with the old town are now used for tourist accommodation, including the hotel, in the old township, and the former Inspector's and General Manager's cottages, at the locality known as 'the Poplars' that lies between the modern-day village and the ruins of the works. The parkland reserve, at the centre of the old town plan, is now the Glen Davis Campground. A lasting legacy of the shale oil era is that the village still receives its freshwater supply via the concrete pipeline from the Oberon Dam.

== National Parks ==
The Wollemi National Park takes in 492,976 hectares and is the second-largest national park in New South Wales. It includes some parts of the Capertee Valley, especially downstream of Glen Davis. The National Parks and Wildlife Service marked out a track between Glen Davis and Newnes, in the Wolgan Valley, and this became a popular walk known as the Pipeline Pass. Bushwalkers also use Glen Davis as the starting point for camping trips in the national park; there is also a camp site in the town.

Nearby are two smaller parks, the Mugii Murum-ban State Conservation Area — an area of particular significance to Wiradjuri people — and the Capertee National Park.

Another national park was created later, known as the Gardens of Stone National Park. This takes in some areas around the Capertee Valley, including the flat-topped mountain—or butte—called Pantony's Crown. This mountain was named after an early farmer who opened the area up to sheep farming. The National Trail, a long-distance walking trail that goes from Melbourne to Cooktown, also passes through the Capertee Valley.

== Popular culture ==
The town was the subject of a documentary film, No Such Place, which was the first film made by the Australian director Peter Butt, in 1981.

The Glen Davis Shale Oil Works and a property now resumed into the National Park downstream from these sites was the location (Paradise Valley) for the 1980 Australian movie The Chain Reaction. The movie was directed by Ian Barry and starred Mel Gibson (uncredited) Steve Bisley, Hugh Keays-Byrne, Roger Ward and Tim Burns, amongst other fellow Mad Max cast and crew. Cinematography by Russell Boyd, and had George Miller as First Assistant Director. Many locals appeared in the movie as extras.

== Gallery ==
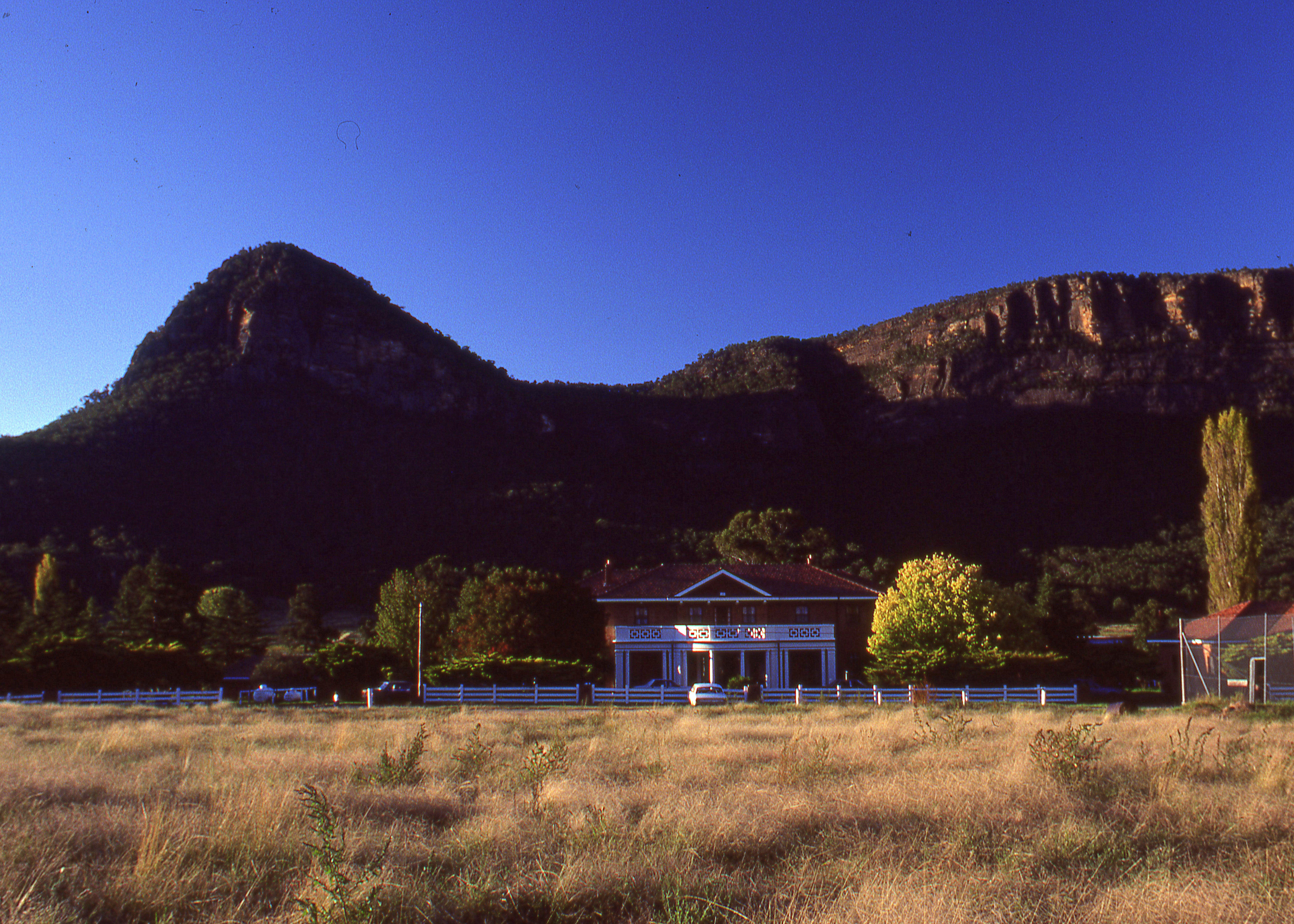
Part of Glen Davis, with a backdrop of the Wollemi National Park. The hotel is at the centre of the photograph.

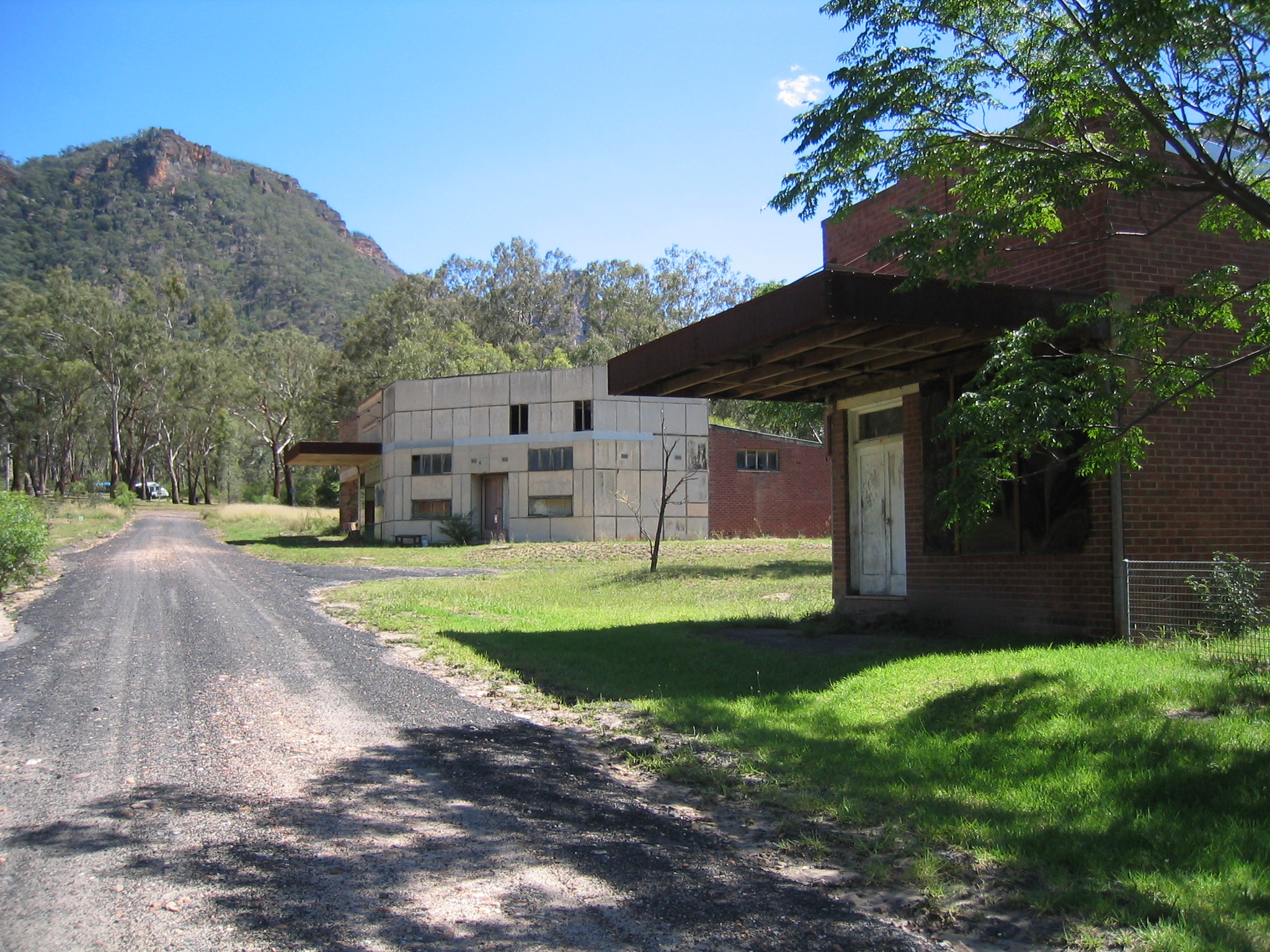
Abandoned shops in Market Place, Glen Davis (Jan. 2005)

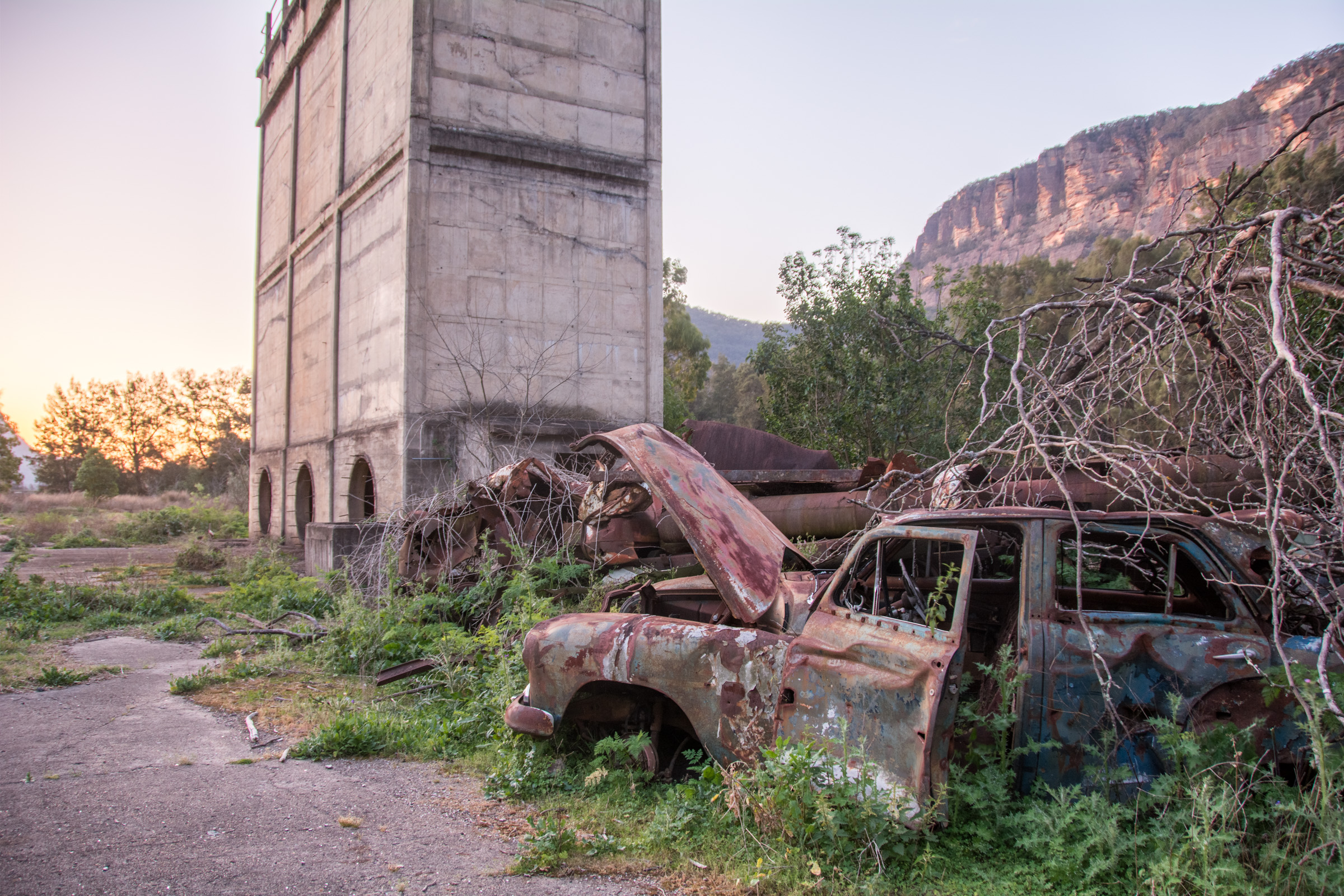
Ruins of Glen Davis Shale Oil Works.

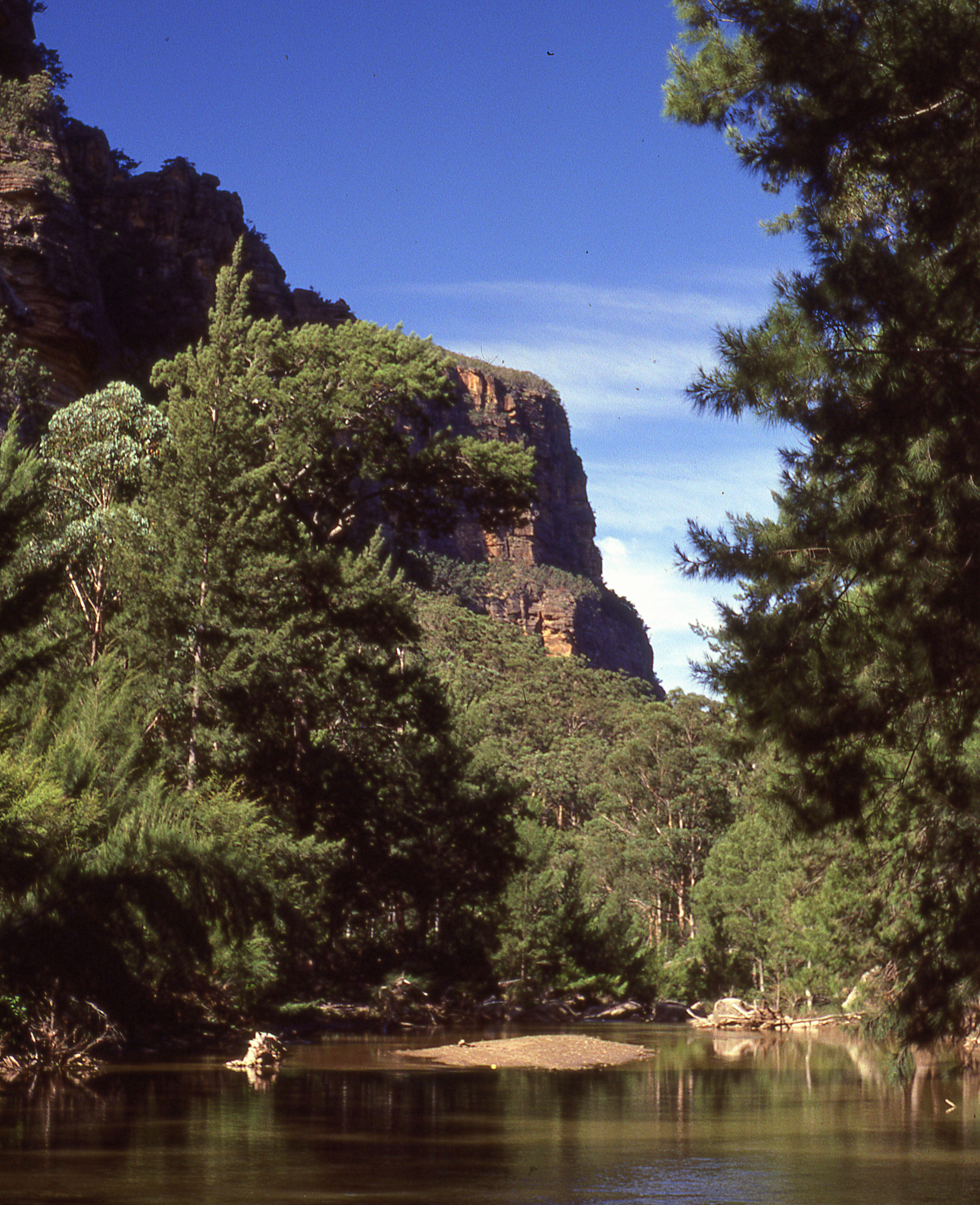
Capertee River downstream of Glen Davis

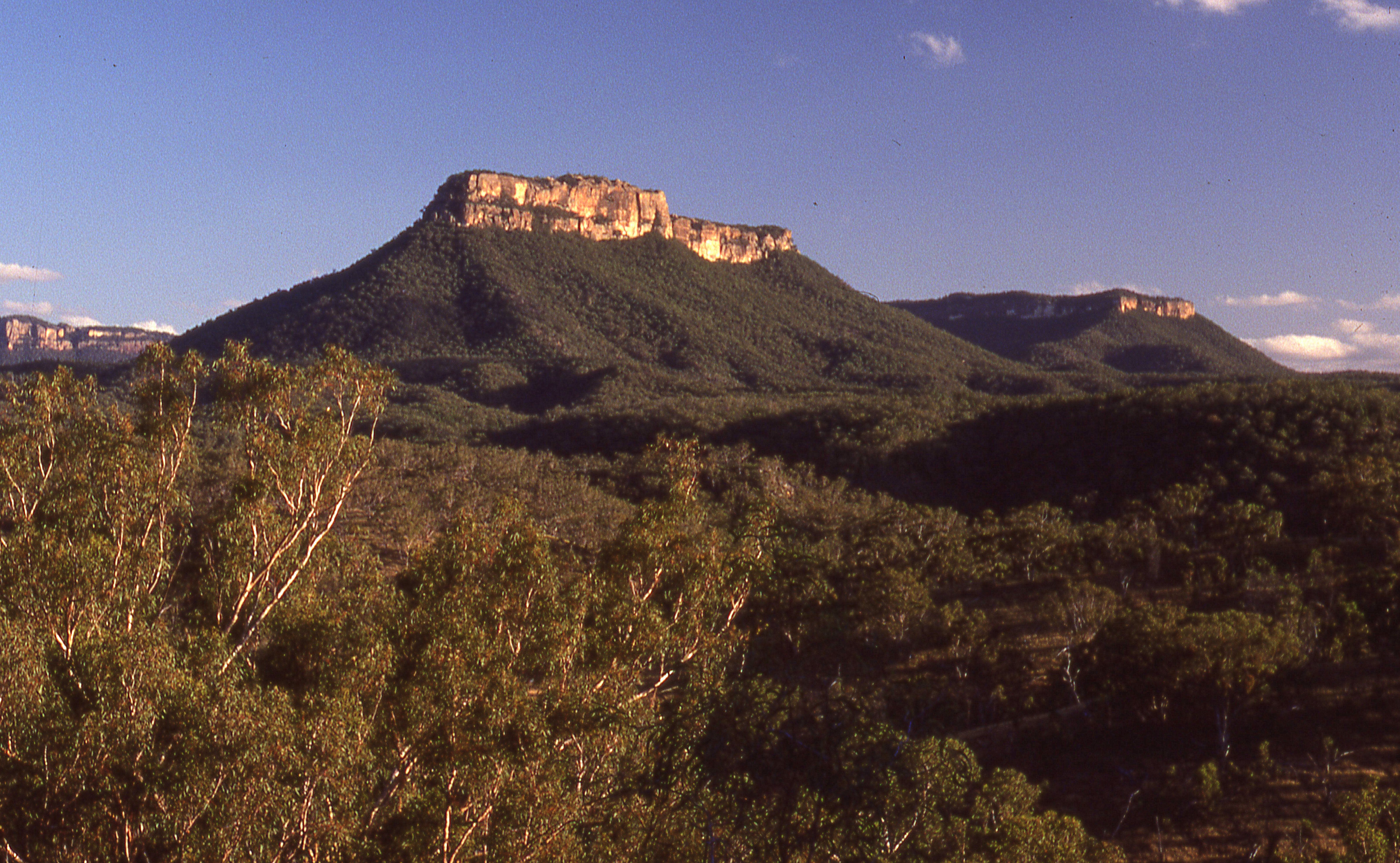
Pantonys Crown, west of Glen Davis

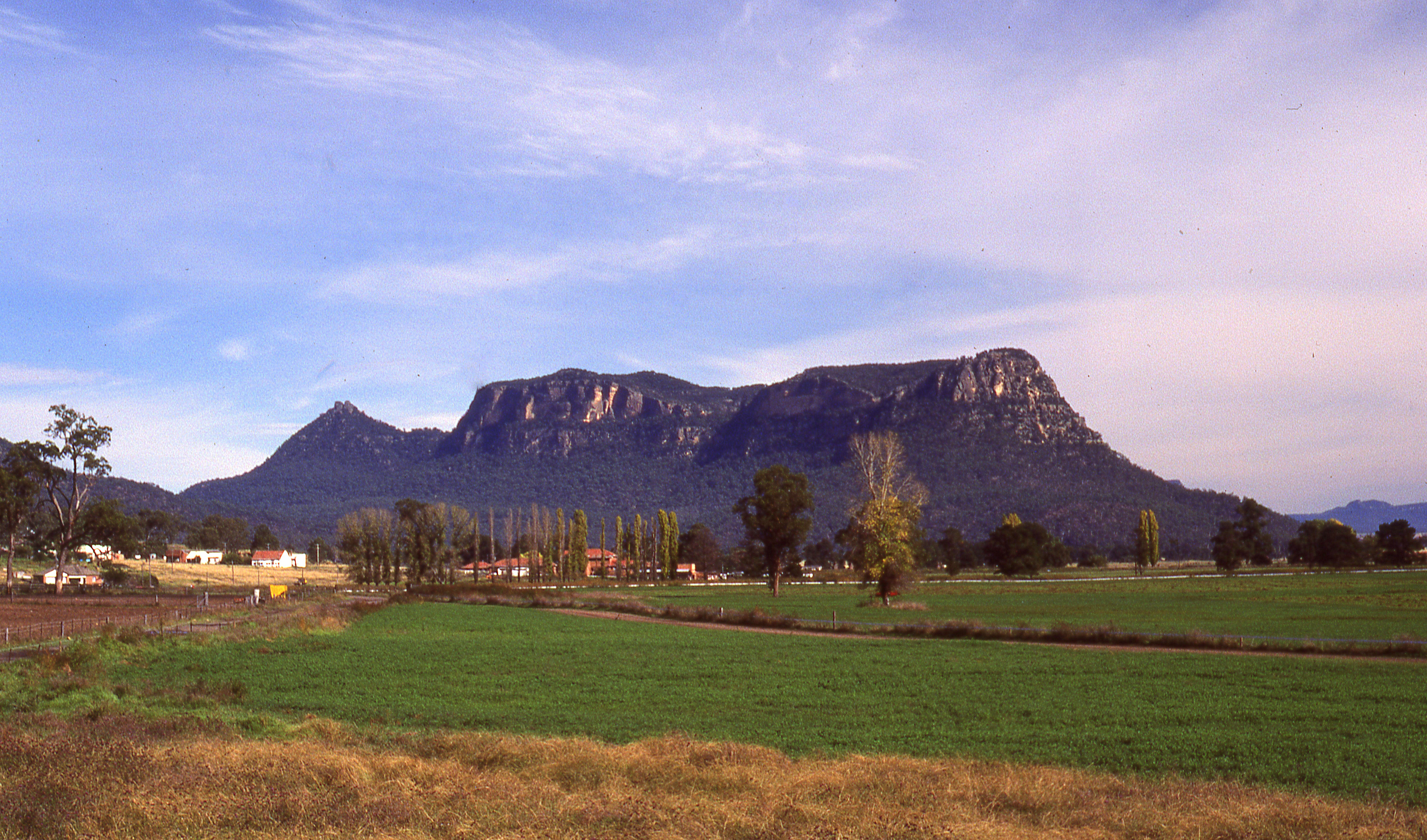
Mount Gundangaroo seen from Glen Davis

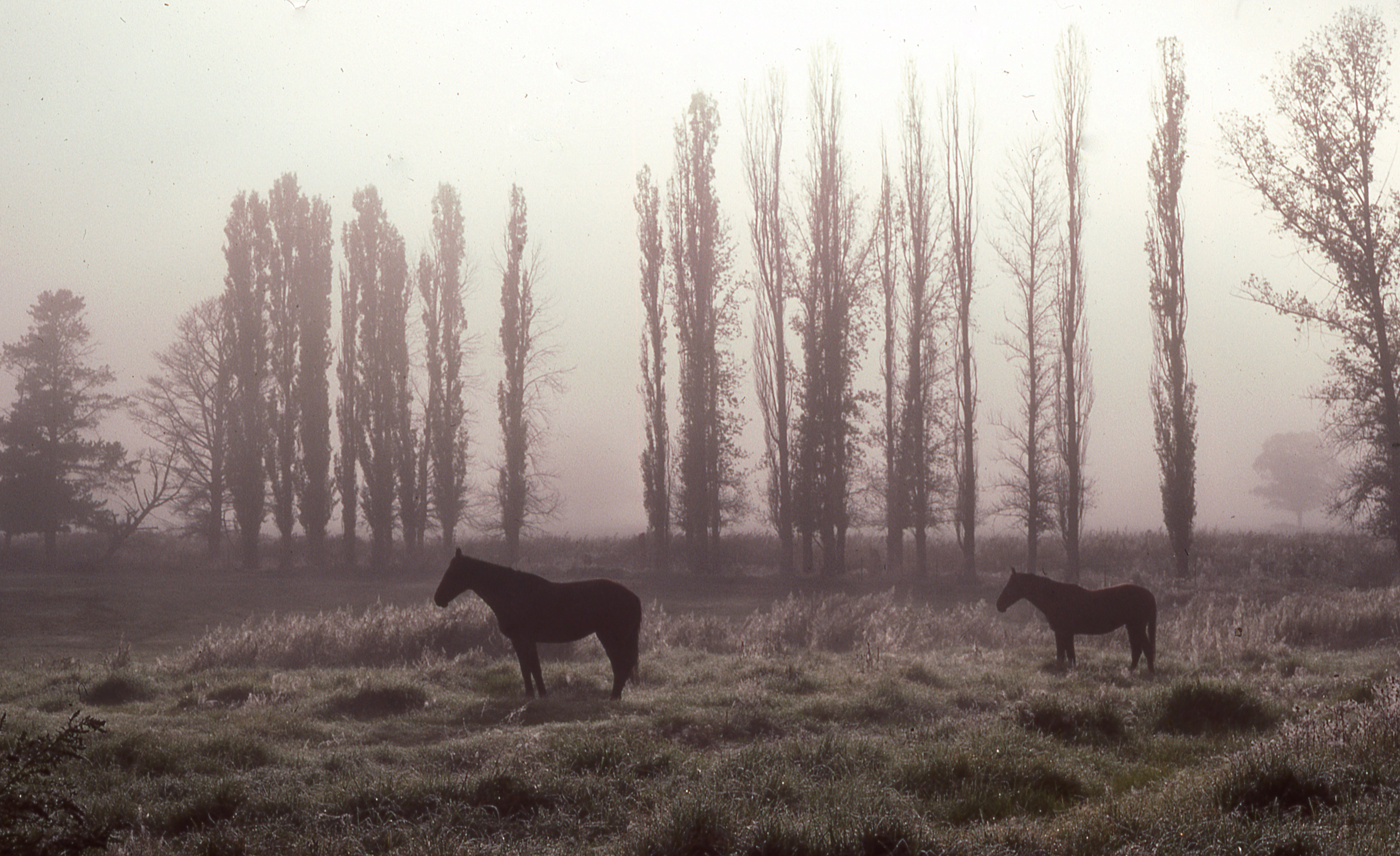
Farmland, Glen Davis

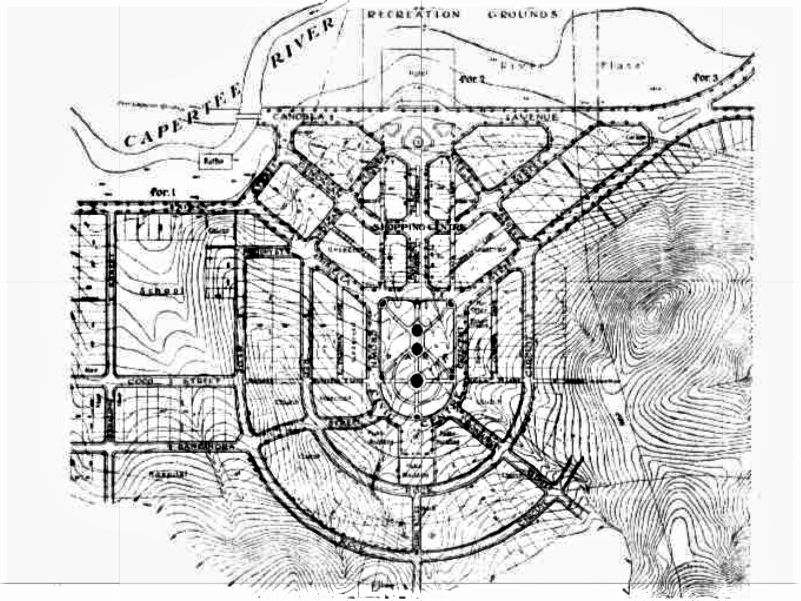
Town Plan of Glen Davis (1939)

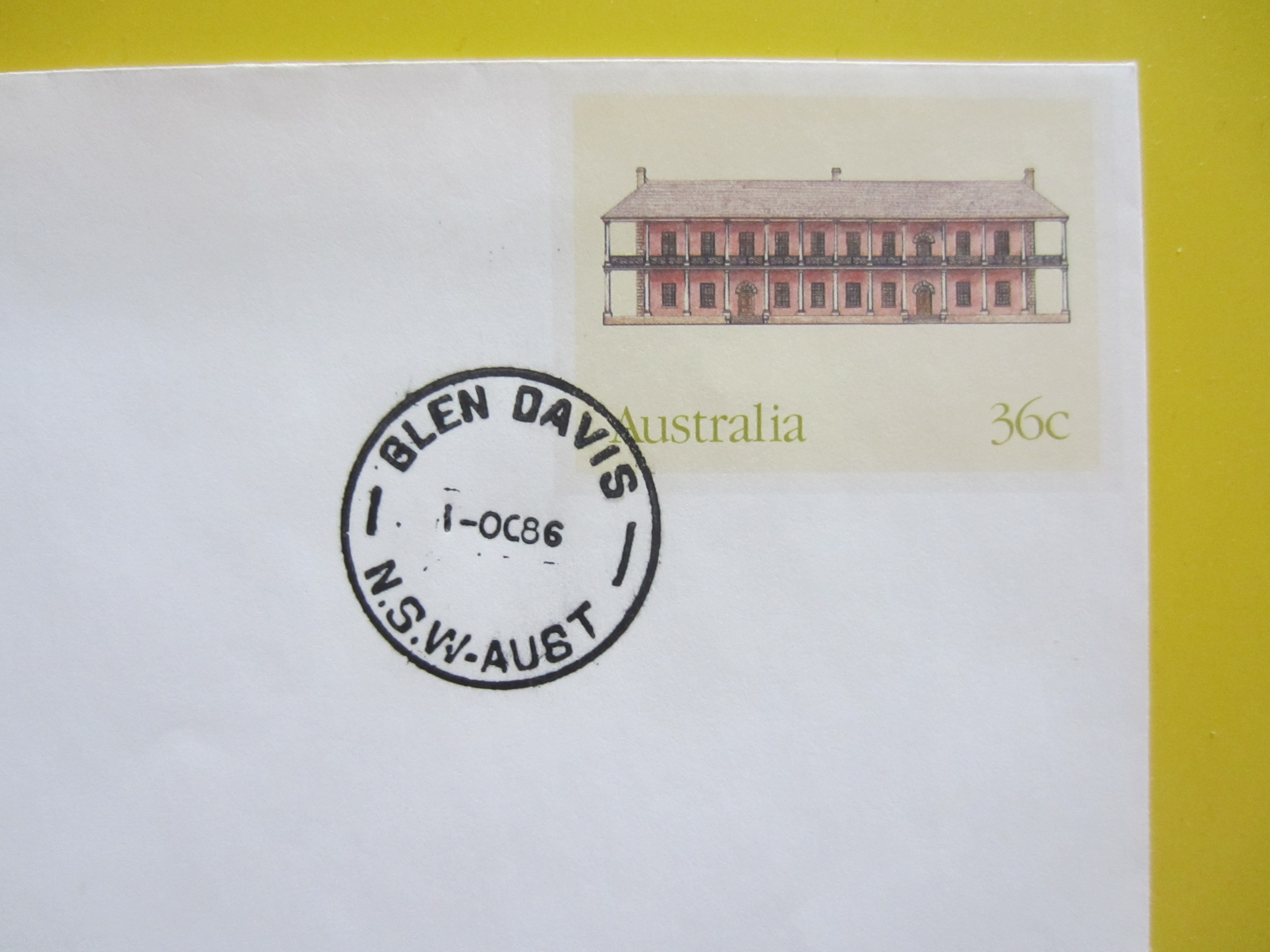
Postmark of the former post office at Glen Davis, made on the day that it closed, 1 October 1986.

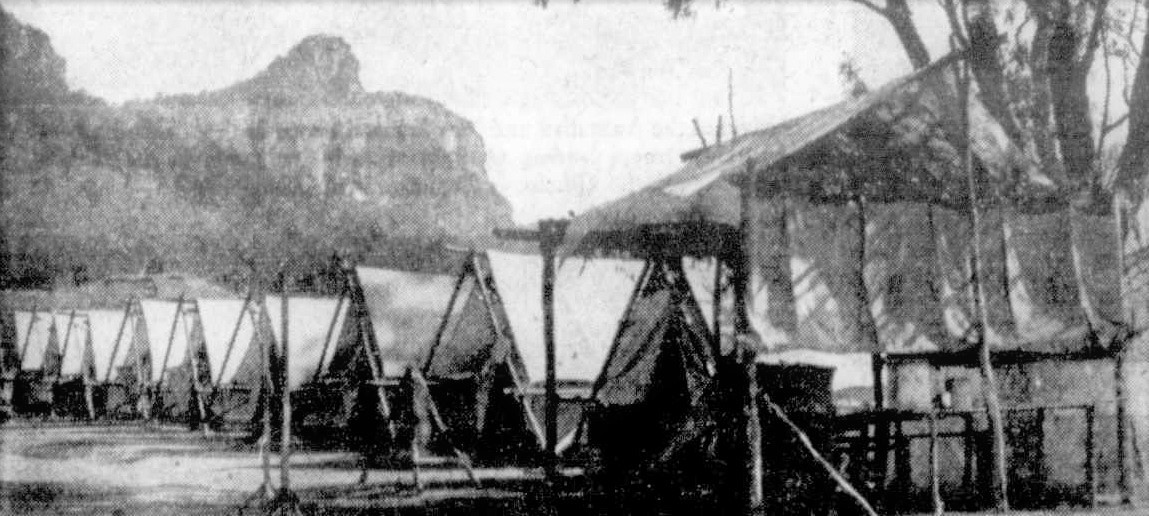
Workers' camp c. 1940 before there was sufficient housing in the new town of Glen Davis.

== See also ==
- Glen Davis Shale Oil Works
- List of Blue Mountains articles
- Newnes
- Wolgan Valley
- Wollemi National Park
- Capertee, New South Wales
- George Francis Davis
