= Wollemi National Park =

National park in Australia

- IUCN category Ib (wilderness area)
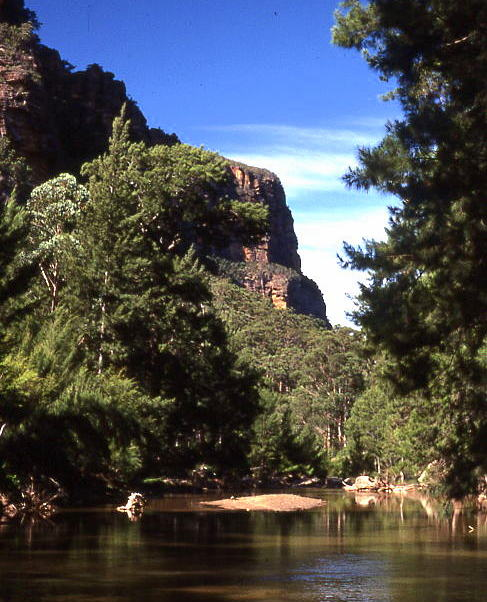
- Capertee River, located within the southern portion of the national park

- Location within New South Wales
- Location: New South Wales
- Nearest city: Lithgow
- Coordinates: 32°52′26″S 150°29′32″E
- Area: 5,017 km^{2} (1,937 sq mi)
- Established: December 1979
- Governing body: NSW National Parks and Wildlife Service
- Website: Official website

The Wollemi National Park (/ˈwɒləmaɪ/) is a protected national park and wilderness area in the Central West and Hunter region of New South Wales, in eastern Australia. The 501,703-hectare (1,239,740-acre) park, the second largest national park in New South Wales, contains the 361,113-hectare (892,330-acre) Wollemi Wilderness – the largest such wilderness area in Australia – and is situated approximately 130 kilometres (81 mi) northwest of Sydney.

The Wollemi National Park is one of the eight protected areas that, in 2000, was inscribed to form part of the UNESCO World Heritage-listed Greater Blue Mountains Area. The Wollemi National Park is the most north-westerly of the eight protected areas within the World Heritage Site. The national park forms part of the Great Dividing Range.

Due to the park's ruggedness, much of it is undiscovered by humans and the many canyons have yet to be explored. The only known living wild specimens of the Wollemi pine (Wollemia nobilis) were discovered in 1994. Special efforts were made to protect the trees when the 2019-20 Australian bushfires burned through the park.

The national park is bounded to the north by the Goulburn River National Park and the Bylong Valley Way; to the east by the Yengo National Park, the Parr State Conservation Area, and the Putty Road; to the south by the Blue Mountains National Park and the Bells Line of Road; to the south-west by the Wolgan Valley and the Gardens of Stone National Park; and to the west by open farmland that surround the towns of Rylstone and Kandos and the Capertee Valley.

== History ==
The area now known as Wollemi National Park has been cared for by Aboriginal peoples for tens of thousands of years, mainly the Wiradjuri, Darkinjung, Dharug, Wonnarua and Yuin nations. The land is important for ceremony, travel, food gathering, and storytelling. Rock art, engravings, grinding grooves, and stone tools found in the park show long-term use and deep cultural connection. Its name is believed to come from an Aboriginal phrase meaning "watch out" or "look around you".

The area was largely avoided by early European settlers during the 1800s, probably due to steep landforms and dense bush. Limited activities such as timber getting, cattle grazing and mining occurred on the edges of the region, but much of the interior remained unexplored. Some parts were used by bushwalkers, surveyors, and explorers, but the landscape’s isolation helped keep it relatively untouched.

Wollemi National Park was officially established in 1979 to preserve New South Wales's largest wilderness area.

One of the most significant moments in the park's history occurred at Wollemi National Park in 1994, when a remote canyon revealed a previously unknown tree species: the Wollemi pine. It attracted worldwide scientific attention and led to increased conservation efforts. The exact location of the wild trees is kept secret to protect them. Often called a “living fossil”, it was thought to be extinct and known only from ancient fossils dating back over 200 million years.

== Geology ==
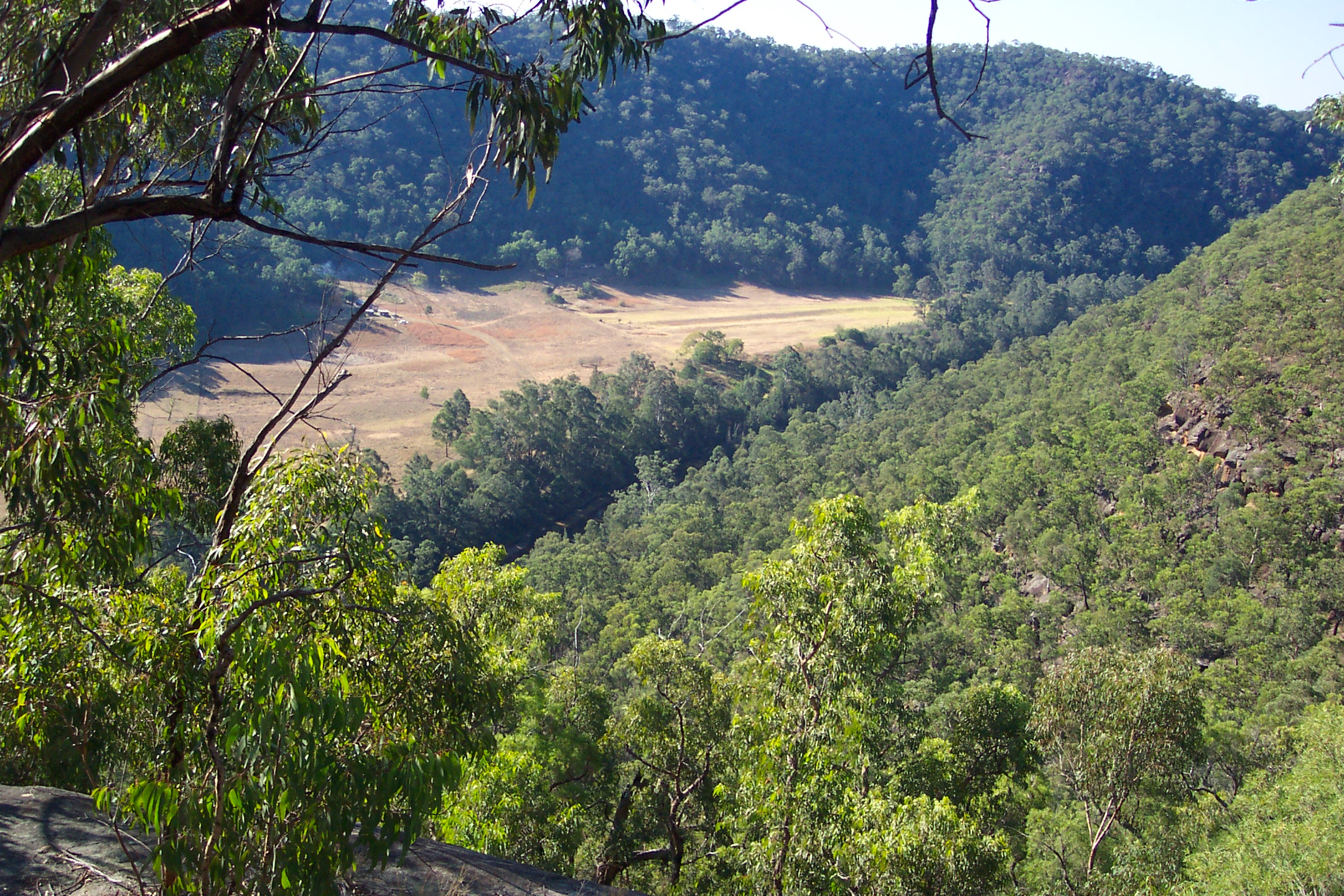
The Colo River valley.

The Wollemi National Park is located on the western edge of the Sydney Basin. It sits on four strata of sedimentary rock; the Narrabeen group, the Sydney sandstone, the Illawarra and Singleton coal measures and the Wianamatta shales. The strata at this area of the Sydney Basin have an upwards tilt to the north-west. Throughout most of the park the Hawkesbury and Wianamatta series have been eroded away exposing the Narrabeen group.

The landscape of the park is dominated by deep valleys, canyons, cliffs and waterfalls, formed by the weathering of the sandstone and claystone the Narrabeen group consists of. The parts of the park that lie on the Narrabeen and Hawkesbury sandstones generally have shallow soil with low nutrient levels while areas that lie on the Wianamatta shale usually have deeper and more nutrient rich soils allowing for a greater diversity of plant life. The coal measures are visible beneath cliff lines along river valleys. This layer is generally rich in nutrients and weathers to form deep clay loams. Tertiary basalt is common in the north west of the park. Basaltic peaks include Mount Coriaday, Mount Monundilla and Mount Coricudgy, the highest peak in the northern Blue Mountains. In some locations the basalt in the core of extinct volcanoes has eroded faster than the surrounding sandstone.

The Wollemi National Park is key in maintaining the quality of many tributary rivers to the Hawkesbury River and Goulburn-Hunter River catchments. The national park incorporates rivers such as the Wolgan River, Colo River and Capertee River which arise from outside the park. The Colo River is regarded as the last unpolluted river in New South Wales because the majority of it flows through the Wollemi National Park.

== Biology and ecology ==
Eucalypt dominated open forests comprise 90% of Wollemi National Park, with over 70 species of Eucalypt recorded. The remaining 10% of the National Park comprises rainforest, heath and grassland.

The variety of habitats within Wollemi National Park allow for large diversity in animals. 58 reptile species, 38 frog species, 235 bird species and 46 mammal species have been recorded in the park.

The only known living wild specimens of the Wollemi pine (Wollemia nobilis), a species thought to have become extinct approximately two million years ago, were discovered in three small stands within deep canyons in 1994. The location is kept secret to protect the groves from diseases and trampling.

Besides the Wollemi Mint Bush, the park contains populations of the rare Banksia penicillata, only described in 1981. The Wollemi Stringybark is a newly discovered species of Eucalyptus tree.

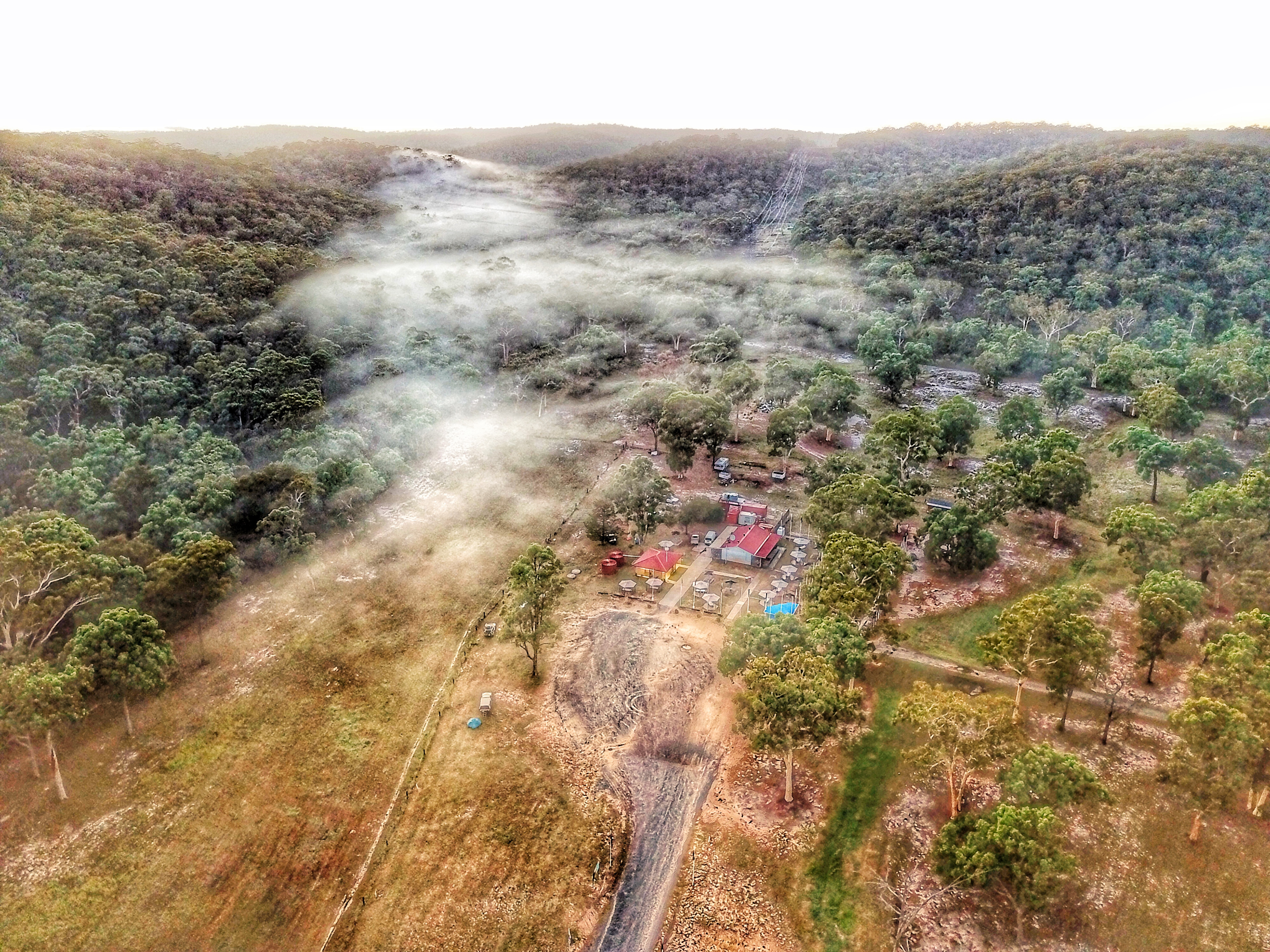
Aerial perspective of the Grey Gum International Cafe, nestled between Wollemi and Yengo national parks. February 2018.

== Aboriginal sites ==
There are many Aboriginal sites within the park including cave paintings, axe grinding grooves and rock carvings. In 2003 the discovery of Eagle's Reach cave was publicly announced. This site was found by bushwalkers in 1995 but remained unknown to the wider community until a team from the Australian Museum reached the cave in May 2003. The art within this small cave is estimated to be up to 4,000 years old and it consists of up to a dozen layers of imagery depicting a wide variety of motifs rendered in ochre and charcoal. The team who recorded this site counted over 200 separate images, mainly of animals and birds but also stencils of hands, axes and a boomerang.

It is a very significant site and the remote location is being kept secret for its own protection.

== Activities ==
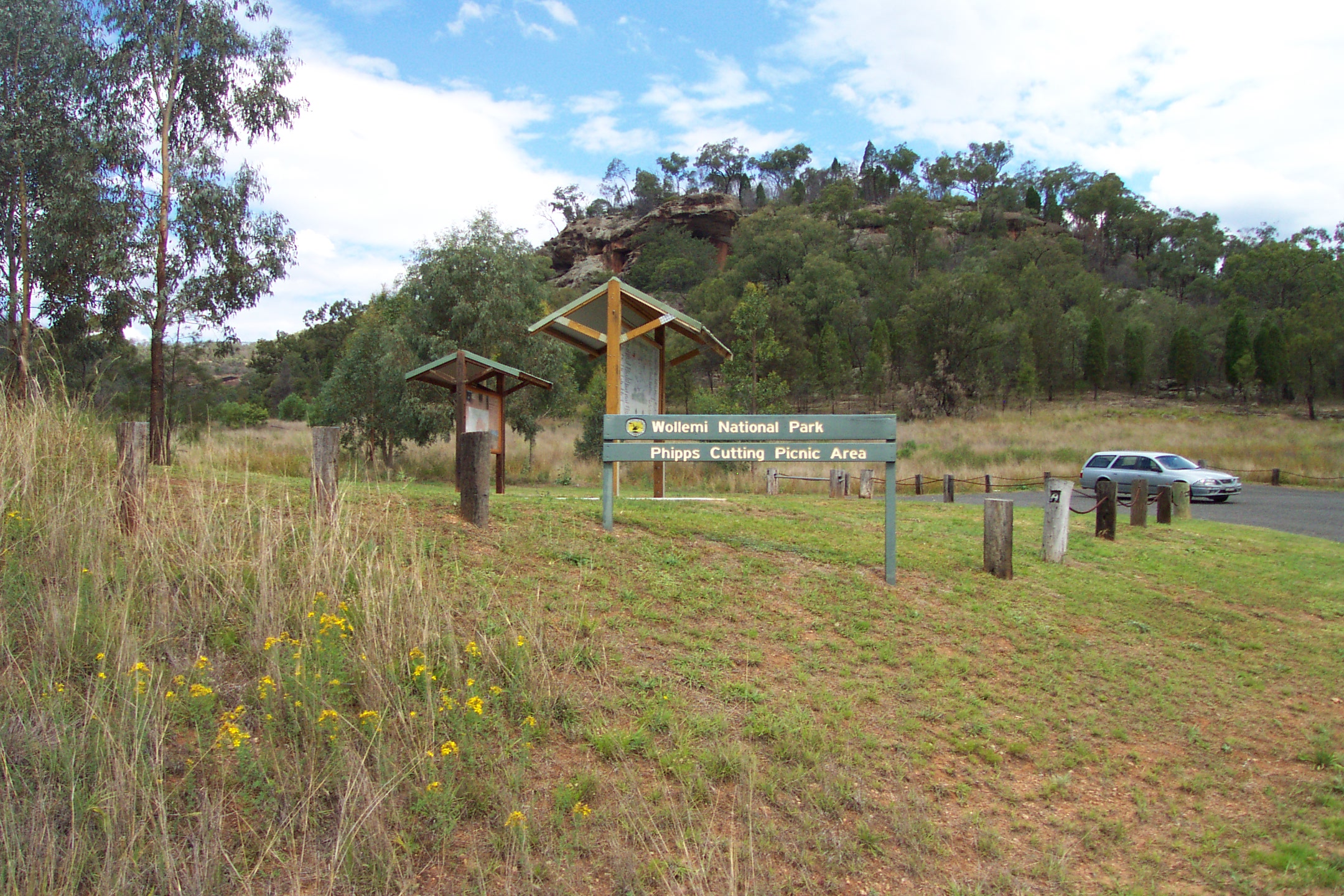
Phipps Cutting Picnic Area on the Bylong Valley Way is an entry point for hiking

- Bushwalking
- Canyoning
- Canoeing
- Camping
- Abseiling

Ganguddy Campground is a campsite located on the Cudgegong River in the park. The local Wiradjuri Aboriginal people know the area as Ganguddy, the alternative name is Dunns Swamp. National Parks and Wildlife Service, New South Wales manages the location.

== Historical places ==
- Wolgan Valley
- Newnes
- Newnes glow worm tunnel
- Zig Zag Railway
- Oil shale Mining
- Glen Davis

== Climate ==
The Wollemi area features an oceanic climate (Köppen climate classification Cfb) with mild to warm summers, cool to cold, sometimes snowy winters and generally steady precipitation year-round, though with a peak in the first few months of the year.

Climate data for Nullo Mountain AWS (1,130 m AMSL; 1991–2020)
Month	Jan	Feb	Mar	Apr	May	Jun	Jul	Aug	Sep	Oct	Nov	Dec	Year
Record high °C (°F)	37.3 (99.1)	37.4 (99.3)	32.0 (89.6)	27.7 (81.9)	21.0 (69.8)	16.8 (62.2)	17.3 (63.1)	20.6 (69.1)	26.4 (79.5)	28.1 (82.6)	34.2 (93.6)	36.5 (97.7)	37.4 (99.3)
Mean daily maximum °C (°F)	24.3 (75.7)	22.8 (73.0)	20.1 (68.2)	16.9 (62.4)	12.9 (55.2)	9.7 (49.5)	9.3 (48.7)	10.9 (51.6)	14.3 (57.7)	17.5 (63.5)	20.0 (68.0)	22.5 (72.5)	16.8 (62.2)
Mean daily minimum °C (°F)	13.8 (56.8)	13.2 (55.8)	11.5 (52.7)	8.6 (47.5)	5.7 (42.3)	3.5 (38.3)	2.5 (36.5)	3.0 (37.4)	5.6 (42.1)	7.9 (46.2)	10.1 (50.2)	11.9 (53.4)	8.1 (46.6)
Record low °C (°F)	4.4 (39.9)	3.8 (38.8)	2.5 (36.5)	−0.8 (30.6)	−2.2 (28.0)	−3.4 (25.9)	−3.6 (25.5)	−4.1 (24.6)	−3.7 (25.3)	−1.1 (30.0)	0.2 (32.4)	1.8 (35.2)	−4.1 (24.6)
Average precipitation mm (inches)	100.8 (3.97)	99.4 (3.91)	108.3 (4.26)	55.6 (2.19)	53.7 (2.11)	75.5 (2.97)	63.4 (2.50)	53.8 (2.12)	69.8 (2.75)	71.0 (2.80)	98.7 (3.89)	90.6 (3.57)	950.0 (37.40)
Average precipitation days	11.6	12.5	13.9	11.7	12.4	16.1	14.9	10.8	10.4	9.5	12.1	11.0	146.9
Average afternoon relative humidity (%)	56	64	64	62	68	74	71	60	56	54	58	56	62
Average dew point °C (°F)	11.5 (52.7)	12.7 (54.9)	10.9 (51.6)	7.5 (45.5)	5.5 (41.9)	3.8 (38.8)	2.7 (36.9)	1.8 (35.2)	3.5 (38.3)	5.1 (41.2)	7.9 (46.2)	9.4 (48.9)	6.9 (44.4)
Source: Bureau of Meteorology

== See also ==
- Protected areas of New South Wales
