= List of shale oil operations in Australia =

This is a list of shale oil operations in Australia. Operations include mining of oil shale, extraction of crude shale oil, and refining of oil products. As there is no shale oil production in Australia currently and little development work underway, this list is mainly of historical interest. The list is grouped first by state and then by location, in alphabetical order. If there was more than one operation at a location, the operations there are listed in approximate chronological order.

== New South Wales ==
Oil shale outcrops at places over a wide area of New South Wales, to the east of the watershed of the Great Dividing Range.

Shale oil operations in New South Wales can be divided into these periods:

- 1865 to 1872 – commencement of a local industry supplying kerosene, candles, and lubricants, for the local market, or oil shale (or oil) for use in town gas enrichment, locally and for export.
- 1873 to 1906 – the industry was dominated by two companies, Australian Kerosene Oil & Mineral and N.S.W. Shale & Oil, both amalgamations of smaller ones; some smaller ventures continued operating.
- 1906 to 1922 – large greenfield developments using English capital, at Newnes and Murrurundi, ending in failure, due largely to cheaper imported 'conventional' crude oil and refined petroleum products. Operations during the earlier part of this period included a continuation of the operations at Hartley Vale and Torbane. Local production received some support from the Commonwealth Government, during the First World War (1914—1918) The first locally made petrol or 'motor spirit' was produced from shale oil during this period.
- 1922 to 1938 – various attempts to re-establish the industry, culminating in the plans, in 1937, for a modern plant at Glen Davis; some small ventures operated sporadically during this period.
- 1939 to 1945 – a number of small operations started production, mainly to overcome wartime fuel shortages, and the commencement of production at the large plant at Glen Davis.
- 1945 to 1952 – the final years of the industry, culminating in the closure of Glen Davis and the abandonment of plans for a large operation at Baerami Creek.

The list below shows shale oil operations that have been recorded in New South Wales; it may not be a complete list.

Location	Company / Owner	Operations	Period of operation	Fate
Airly (See also Torbane)	Genowlan Shale Company	Mined 'export quality' oil shale from Genowlan Mine, which was shipped to Germany for enriching town gas.	1883	
Airly (See also Torbane)	Australian Kerosene Oil & Mineral Company / Australian Shale Syndicate	Leases taken over by Australian Oil Syndicate. Genowlan Mine operated by Australian Kerosene Oil & Mineral Company for payment of a royalty.	c.1895–1904	
Airly (See also Torbane)	Australian Shale Syndicate	Genowlan Mine supplied shale to the Commonwealth Oil Corporation retorts at Torbane.	1906–1910	Australian Shale Syndicate assets acquired by British Australian Oil Company in 1910.
Airly (See also Torbane)	British Australian Oil Company	Genowlan Mine supplied shale to the Commonwealth Oil Corporation retorts at Torbane, until 1913.	1910–1915	Mining ceased when retorts at Torbane shutdown in 1913, but there may have been some activity up to February 1915.
'Bathgate' / Marrangaroo (see also Marrangaroo below)	Mackenzie Brothers	Oil shale mine. ('Bathgate' lay on Dr Mackenzie's property, about a mile from the Main Western railway line at the point where it passed through the original Marrangaroo tunnel.)	1870s	The operation at 'Bathgate' was ultimately unsuccessful, although more shale was discovered, about a mile away, in 1888.
Baerami Creek / 'Baerami'	Various	Small scale mining.	During period 1915–1925	
Baerami Creek / 'Baerami'	Muswellbrook-Baerami Shale Syndicate / Jaeger	A retort was set up by Mr. Jaeger and the first oil was made from Baerami Creek oil shale.	1925–c. 1927	
Baerami Creek / 'Baerami'	Widden-Baerami Shale Oil and Coal Ltd	In 1929, the company tested six tons of shale, assaying 150 gallons to the ton, using an A.B.S. retort set up at St Leonards, in Sydney. 50 tons were shipped to England and another sample to Germany, in 1929, for testing, with the objective of settling upon a retort design to adopt. They were attempting to obtain English backing, in 1930, having achieved 140 gallons per ton in a test. Developmental mining began, in 1931, and there were plans for a township.	1929–1934	After attempts at a merger and a subsequent dispute with Baerami South Shale and Oil Co. Ltd., that company was granted the Widden Baerami leases in 1934.
Baerami Creek / 'Baerami'	Shale Oil Development Committee	Mining work to drive tunnels and determine the tonnage of shale available for mining. This was a government organisation which offered support to mining fields not companies, with such a policy leading to an attempted merger between Baerami South and Widden-Baerami Shale and Oil Ltd. (see below).	1931	
Baerami Creek / 'Baerami'	Bearami South Shale and Oil Co. Ltd	The company was floated in 1930 and set up an experimental A.B.S. retort on its shale leases at Baerami. There were efforts toward a merger with Widden-Baerami Shale and Oil Ltd, but those efforts seems to have ended in dispute. In 1934, it was granted the former leases of Widden-Baerami Shale and Oil Ltd. Its activities ceased when it failed to find sufficient financial backing.	1930–1937	The leases were effectively abandoned, around 1935, but the company was able to retain control of those leases, in 1937. Also in 1937, the leases were sold to Standard Oil of Australia (see below)
Baerami Creek / 'Baerami'	Baerami Oil Development Limited / Hosier and White	Company issued a prospectus to raise capital and acquire leases of Bearami South Shale and Oil Co. (in liquidation) and use the retort technology of Australian Imperial Shale Oil Company (refer Wollar and Barigan).	1936	Nothing appears to have eventuated (perhaps the capital raising failed), because the Baerami South leases were sold in 1937, to Standard Oil of Australia (see below)
Baerami Creek / 'Baerami'	Colonial Petroleum Oil Limited	Miller retort was erected and operated at Baerami Creek.	1940–c. 1942	
Baerami Creek / 'Baerami'	Standard Oil of Australia	From 1937 to 1952, the company attempted to implement its plans for a large shale oil industry based on the Baerami Creek deposit. They used a Renco / NTU retort at Hamilton to successfully carry out trial retorting over three months in 1939. The government moved the retort to Glen Davis where it sat unused. (The same type of retort was used successfully at Marrangaroo.)	Operation 1939 Period of involvement 1937–1952	Plan for further development of an oil industry at Baerami rejected by government in 1945.(Despite its similar name, Standard Oil of Australia is unrelated to Standard Oil.)
Baerami Creek / 'Baerami'	Shale Oil Products Co-Op Limited	Mining and moving the shale by road to its retorts at nearby Sandy Hollow. This operation only used the richest of the oil shale from the Baerami seams, discarding the rest. (see also Sandy Hollow below)	1943–1945	The company was in liquidation by June 1945, when its equipment was put up for sale. Production ceased in August 1945. Only viable under wartime conditions.
Balls Head Bay / Kerosene Bay	Australian Mineral Oil Co.	Shale retorts and refinery. The shale came from Stony Creek near 'West Maitland', (probably near modern-day Farley). Later shale seems to have come from Hartley Vale.	c.1865—c. 1868	Buildings taken over by an explosive works. It was this industry that gave the waterway its earlier name 'Kerosene Bay'.
Barigan (14 miles from Wollar, near Lue)	William Wall	Secured 'shale land' at Barrigan, including about 400 acres of private and 640 acres of Crown land	1906	Seems to have not proceeded to mining.
Barigan (14 miles from Wollar, near Lue)	Barigan Shale Syndicate / Barigan Shale Company Limited / Molesworth	Leases taken up and plans to erect retorts and pipeline to Lue railway station.	1921	Company deregistered in 1939. (A different entity was later using the same name, 'Barigan Shale Company,' see below.)
Barigan (14 miles from Wollar, near Lue)	Australian Imperial Shale Oil Co	Plans to exploit deposit using the 'Schultz' process.	1930	
Barigan (14 miles from Wollar, near Lue)	Barigan Shale Company	Mining commenced in 1942 to feed retorts planned to be at Mudgee. The mine was supplying shale to retorts operated by Viggers at Hamilton.	1942–1944	
Berrima	Coal and Oil By-products	Shale treatment works, processing shale from a company mine at Joadja. (Also Airly and Burragorang)	1941–1942	
Burragorang Valley	Various	There was some exploratory drilling and mining of oil shale in this area.	1930–1931 1937 1941–1942	No longer accessible after the construction of Warragamba Dam.
Camelia (previously known as Sandown)	Australian Kerosene Oil and Mineral Company	Works making soap and candles. The materials used were made at Joadja and came from there by rail, via Mittagong. The works lay on riverfront land between the river and the tram line to the Redbank Wharf. The works had already closed and were for sale in February 1902.	1887–c. 1901	Land sold off in 1908.
Capertee	Crown Ridge Mine	Shale mine west of the Mudgee road, near Blackman's Crown, which exploited a seam of oil shale that was separate from the seam mined at nearby Torbane and Airly. First mined c. 1891.	1891–1909	Lease acquired by Australian Shale Syndicate in 1909.
Capertee	Australian Shale Syndicate (Crown Ridge Mine)	Shale mine, as above, under different owner.	1909–1910	Assets of Australian Shale Syndicate acquired by British Australian Oil Company.
Capertee	British Australian Oil Company (Crown Ridge Mine)	Shale mine, as above, under different owner. Its operation was not continuous.	1910–1915	Mining ceased in February 1915.
Capertee	John Fell and Company (Crown Ridge Mine)	1000 tons of 'bottoms' shale that had been stockpiled at Crown Ridge Mine was shipped by rail to Newnes and processed. It had become more valuable, probably due to wartime conditions.	1918–1919	
Capertee	Viddler & Stocks (Crown Ridge Mine)	Development work and trial oil production from a retort erected at the mine in 1922, sporadic production of shale after that until some time in 1925.	1922–1925	
Capertee	Coal and Oil By-products (Crown Ridge Mine)	This company took an option over the mine and small quantities of shale were shipped for treatment at Berrima.	1941–1945	
Clandulla (then called 'Mornington')	Mornington Proprietary Oil Company	Carbonaceous shale mine and lead-bath retorts.	1901–1902	The quality of the carbonaceous shale was too poor to extract its oil content economically, by any available method. The site was abandoned, and the company was in liquidation by mid 1902.
Darling Harbour	Australian Kerosene Oil and Mineral Company	A depot in Hay Street. Its operations were moved to Camellia c. 1887.	?-1887	
Farley / 'West Maitland'	Russell's Cannel Coal Mines	Shale mine at Stony Creek near 'West Maitland', (probably near modern-day Farley). The shale was processed by Australian Mineral Oil Co. at Balls Head Bay on Sydney Harbour.	c.1865–c. 1868	
Glen Alice / 'The Nile'	Glen Alice Coal and Shale Mining Company	Shale mine at the foot of Mount Innes, on the northern side of the Capertee Valley. The company was seeking to sell its shale property in February 1898, although it may have still been operating, perhaps as late as 1902.	c.1894–c. 1902	
Glen Alice / 'The Nile'	Glen Alice Shale Company (Ltd)	Company launched in late 1905 to acquire shale leases in the area. Uncertain whether mining operations commenced. The company voted to wind up its operations in December 1906. but was not deregistered until 1938.	1905–1906	
Glen Davis (previously known as North Newnes)	National Oil Proprietary Limited	Shale oil mine, retorts and oil refinery. (Coal was sourced from a nearby mine owned by others.) A new town was built to house its workers, named Glen Davis, after George Francis Davis. Site of last oil shale production in New South Wales in 1952.	Construction from 1938 Operation 1940–1952	Government support discontinued and operations were shut down
Greenwich / Gore Bay	John Fell & Company	Lubricating oil refinery and blending plant, that processed crude oil, mainly from Newnes, until 1922, after when it processed imported crude oil.	1911–1927	Sold to Shell in 1927, and continued as a refinery until at least 1937.
Hamilton	British Australian Oil Company	Oil refinery, processing crude oil made at Murrurundi.	Construction from 1910 Operation 1911–1915	Closed down. Refining assets sold to Commonwealth Oil Refineries and equipment removed and reused at refinery at Laverton, Victoria.
Hamilton	Viggers	Refining crude from Barigan.	1940–1944	Closed down. Site used as oil depot by Shell until 2014.
Hartley Vale / 'Petrolea Vale'	Hartley Kerosene Oil and Paraffine Company / 'Petrolea Vale Company'	Shale mine with adjacent 'Petrolea Vale' retorts.	1865–1870	'Petrolea Vale' retorts closed in 1870. In 1871, its assets were bought by T.S. Mort, a director of Western Kerosene Oil Company, and were merged with those of Western Kerosene Oil Co. (see below) in 1872 to form N.S.W Shale & Oil Company.
Hartley Vale / 'Petrolea Vale'	Western Kerosene Oil Company	Shale mine with shale shipped to Waterloo for retorting. Company incorporated in 1867.	1867–1872	Company merged with Hartley Kerosene Oil and Paraffine Co. (see above) in 1872 to form N.S.W Shale & Oil Company, which took over operations.
Hartley Vale / 'Petrolea Vale'	N.S.W. Shale & Oil	The new company took over all existing operations at Hartley Vale. Had 10 retorts in operation there, by June 1880, and by May 1883 there were 69 with more being built. The retorts were operated by A. M. Fell & Sons, from December 1886, with N.S.W. Shale & Oil contracted to supply the mined shale.	1872–1906	N.S.W. Shale & Oil was sold to Commonwealth Oil Corporation in 1906 (see below).
Hartley Vale / 'Petrolea Vale'	Commonwealth Oil Corporation	Oil shale mine and retorts.	1906–1910	The retorts were closed in 1910, when the shale mines were exhausted and retort operation was about to commence at Newnes.
Hartley Vale / 'Petrolea Vale'	Commonwealth Oil Corporation	Oil refinery, expanded in 1910. It closed initially in 1913, but seems to have lingered on until a final closure in 1914.	1906–1914	Closed after Commonwealth Oil Corporation entered receivership. Some equipment relocated to Newnes and Greenwich / Gore Bay refineries by John Fell.
Jamison Valley / Ruined Castle (near Katoomba)	Ruined Castle Oil Shale Mines / John Britty North	Oil shale mines with tramway to the incline railway, at Katoomba. Short-lived Bleichert ropeway across Jamison Valley.	1880s – 1890s	
Jamison Valley / Ruined Castle (near Katoomba)	Australian Kerosene Oil and Mineral Company (as lessee)	Mines reopened and operated briefly. (See also this company's concurrent operation at Glen Shale Mine in Megalong Valley.)	1903–1904	
Joadja	Various owners: Edward Carter / George Larkin / Parbury, Lamb & Co	Shale mines. Originally the shale was sent elsewhere for processing by road. Parbury, Lamb & Co, built the inclined railway that took shale out of the valley.	1873–1878	Australian Kerosene Oil & Mineral Company was set up and acquired the mining leases in the valley from their earlier owners.
Joadja	Australian Kerosene Oil & Mineral Company	Retorts and extensive refinery, in addition to mines, all located in the valley of Joadja Creek. Site produced kerosene and candles. In 1880, a 14 km long narrow-gauge railway was opened to connect the incline with the Main South railway at Mittagong.	1878–1896 1901–1902	After works closed, the valley continued to produce fruit from orchards planted by the company, In 1906, shareholders voted to wind up the company. The company was still in liquidation, when the Joadja Creek property was sold in 1911.
Joadja	Shale Petrol Oil Company	Mining recommenced. The company erected a 'Leahy-Wilson' vertical retort, which was operational for a short time, before it blew up also bringing mining operations to an end. Some oil products were shipped to customers.	1920–1925	By January 1923, the directors had received the approval of shareholders to sell the company's property at Joadja to Oil Shale Products & Coal Limited. The company eventually went out of business, having failed to offload the assets to the new venture.
Joadja	Oil Shale Products & Coal Limited	The company attempted to raise capital and issued a prospectus in 1921, but press reports were skeptical. Another attempt to raise capital occurred, in 1923, but the prospectus again was subjected to significant criticism in the press, and these plans did not eventuate.	1921–1925	The raising of capital having failed, the leases were still in the name of the Shale Petrol Oil Company and, in 1925, the mining leases were cancelled. The company was in liquidation in 1926.
Joadja	Peters American Delicacy Pty. Ltd. / McDonald & Gotting / Mittagong Shale Products	Small scale mining to supply a plant at Mittagong, providing fuel for delivery vehicles, under wartime conditions.	1941–1944	Mining probably ceased after the Mittagong plant was severely damaged in a fire in December 1944. Last mining at Joadja.
Kerosene Vale	Kerosene Vale Oil Works / Mackenzie Brothers	Oil shale mine, retorts and refinery.	1867 – early 1870s	Abandoned after thicker seam of oil shale was discovered at a nearby location ‘Bathgate’ (about a mile from the Main Western railway line at the point where it passed through the original Marrangaroo tunnel.)
Macdonaldtown	Everleigh Railway Workshops / Everleigh gasworks	Everleigh gasworks was located to the south of Macdonaldtown railway station. There were two essentially separate operations here. One operation produced gas from coal, and the other operation produced gas for railway carriage illumination, from oil shale. The northern gasholder for the shale gas was about half the size of the gasholder for coal gas.	1892–1958, but shale gas production probably ceased earlier.	The preserved southern gasholder, which held gas made from coal, survives, because it was retained to store town gas until 1977.The northern gasholder, which held the gas made from oil shale, was demolished with most of the gasworks in 1958.
Marrangaroo	Lithgow Oil Proprietary Limited	Oil shale mine and NTU retorts producing crude oil. Two million gallons of crude oil made at Marrangaroo was refined, at Glen Davis by National Oil Proprietary Ltd. The oil shale deposit was small but exceptionally rich, assaying 237 US gallons per long ton.	1943–1945	Closed in November 1945, as a result of the end of the Second World War.
Megalong Valley / Nellies Glen / Narrow Neck	Glen Oil Shale Mines / T.S Mort	Oil shale mine and tramway, which passed through Mt Rennie Tunnel under Narrow Neck, linking with another tramway to the inclined railway to Katoomba.	1886–1896	Ostensibly mined out, closed down, and tramway tracks lifted.
Megalong Valley / Nellies Glen / Narrow Neck	John Britty North	North purchased the mines in 1900. He reconstructed the Australian Kerosene Oil and Mineral Company.	1900–1903	
Megalong Valley / Nellies Glen / Narrow Neck	Australian Kerosene Oil and Mineral Company	In 1903, tramway was relaid and second-class shale was removed from existing stockpiles near the mine, for use by Australian Gas Light Company.	1903–1904	
Megalong Valley / Nellies Glen / Narrow Neck	(Unknown)	The Glen Shale Mine was reopened and worked briefly.	1921–?	
Megalong Valley / Nellies Glen / Narrow Neck	Genders of Lithgow (owners of Great Cobar Colliery, Lithgow)	The Glen Shale Mine was reopened and shale was mined, which was taken to new retorts at Torbane. Petrol was produced to supply the needs of their own vehicle fleet during wartime fuel shortage.	1941-1944	Only viable under wartime conditions, closed.
Mittagong	Herbert Gotting & J.M. Browne / H.E. Gotting and Son	A combined retort and distillation system was patented c. 1933 and demonstrated in 1935, using oil shale from Joadja and Newnes.	1930–1935	
Mittagong	Herbert & Leonard Gotting	Small scale retort and refinery producing petrol and other liquid fuels and gas for the Gotting family's own consumption, using oil shale from Joadja.	1940–1944	Peters took an interest in Mittagong Shale Products, which set up a production facility using Herbert Gotting's retort design.
Mittagong	Peters American Delicacy Pty. Ltd. / Ampol Petroleum / Mittagong Shale Products	A plant at Mittagong, providing fuel for delivery vehicles, under wartime conditions, processing shale from Joadja and Reedy Creek (also in local area). The plant used six retorts of Herbert Gotting's design, later extended to 18 retorts. It was severely damaged by fire in December 1944. (Peters was also a shareholder in Shale Oil Products Co-Op Limited which operated at Sandy Hollow from 1943 to 1945.)	1941–1944	Not restarted after fire, and the war ended.
Mount Kembla / American Creek	Pioneer Kerosene Works / John Graham	Shale mine, retorts and refinery near American Creek. Commenced operation in June 1865, and was the first commercial shale oil operation in Australia.	1865– 1874	Change of ownership and management in 1874.
Mount Kembla / American Creek	American Creek Oil Company / Ebenezer Vickery	Shale mining and retort operation continued and was reorganised by its manager, Alexander Morrison Fell.	1875–1878	Production ceased in 1878, when the shale was mined out. Mount Kembla Coal & Oil Company was founded in 1879, and focus shifted to exploiting coal seams outcropping on the same land at Mount Kembla.
Mount Victoria / Victoria Pass	'Evans and party'	Small-scale shale mining from a seam near the foot of Victoria Pass.	1898	
Mount Victoria / Grose Valley	'Wallace and party'	A seam of oil shale was found in the Grose Valley near Mount Victoria.	1893	
Mount Victoria / Grose Valley	Mackenzie and Wood / N.S.W. Extended Shale and Oil Company	Two adits and drives were made into the seam to develop a mine, and a company set up with the goal of exploiting the deposit in the Grose Valley. Other parties prospected in the area for shale, once it became apparent the there was a widespread deposit.	1897	Does not seem to have progressed beyond exploratory mining to full-scale operation.
Murrurundi / Mount Temi	Northern Shale Company / Thomas Affleck	Oil shale was mined and sent to the Melbourne Gas Company, Newcastle Gas Company, and to the Werris Creek Railway Gasworks (see Werris Creek below) and Newcastle Railway Gasworks.	1887–1890	Only mined for around six months, in 1887, but probably operated intermittently thereafter (1889) to supply the Werris Creek and Newcastle railway gasworks (see Werris Creek below).
Murrurundi / Mount Temi	Australian Shale Syndicate	Lease at Mt Temi was acquired in 1905. Around 1906 it was verifying and planning to exploit the resource. By mid 1907 development of the mine was well underway, with 13 men working at the mine, and, by September 1908, a main haulage tunnel extended 400m into the seam. 50-acres of land had been set aside for a settlement.	1905–1910	Assets sold to British Australian Oil Company (see below) in 1910.
Murrurundi / Mount Temi	British Australian Oil Company	Shale mine at Mt Temi and aerial ropeway from the mine to a retort site at Murrurundi. Rail branch from Temple Court north of Murrurundi used to send oil to the refinery at Hamilton.	Construction from 1910 Operation 1911–1915	Abandoned in 1915. Partially demolished in 1923, with remainder demolished in 1929. Branch railway was lifted in 1931.
Murrurundi / Mount Temi	Australian Shale Oil Pty Ltd later Australian Shale Oil Corporation Ltd.	Took up the Mount Temi shale leases, with the intention of exploiting the resource. There was some trial retorting of shale, using the American-invented Bronder retorting process. However, before significant work was done at Murrurundi, Australian Shale Oil Corporation was approached by the Tasmanian Government seeking to interest the company in exploiting shale oil deposits in Tasmania.	1923–1924	The company subsequently set up its mining and shale oil extraction operations, near Latrobe in the Mersey Valley area of Tasmania, and there was no revival of the oil shale industry at Murrurundi.
Murrurundi / Mount Temi	E. & E. Shale Oil Retorting Company / E. & E. Hydrogenation Pty Ltd.	Oil shale from Mt Temi was tested in Sydney, using an Australian Invention known as the 'E. and E. Process' (a retorting and hydrogenation process using superheated air and steam with shale or shale and coal mixture)) and produced 80 gallons of crude oil per ton.	1937–1938	Plans to erect retorts at the Mt Temi mine had not eventuated by mid 1939. Attention shifted to the Miller retorts of Colonial Petroleum Oil Limited and the deposit at Baerami Creek.
Newnes	Campbell Mitchell	The oil shale deposit was identified by Campbell Mitchell, son of Thomas Mitchell. He employed two men to open the seam.	1873	Did not progress to significant mining.
Newnes	George Anderson	Small scale mining.	1903–1905	Sold his land and mine to Commonwealth Oil Corporation
Newnes	Commonwealth Oil Corporation	Shale oil mines, coal mines, retorts, coke ovens and oil refinery. (Before commencing oil production the company sold coke to William Sandford Limited and later G & C Hoskins to feed their blast furnace at Lithgow.) A new town was built there, named Newnes, after George Newnes.	Construction from 1907 Operation 1911–1913	Commonwealth Oil Corporation entered receivership in 1912.
Newnes	Commonwealth Oil Corporation (managed by John Fell)	Shale oil mines, coal mines, retorts, and oil refinery. Shale mining and retort operations ceased in 1922, and the oil refinery closed in 1923.	1914–1923	Reasons given for ending operation were the high cost of mining and competition from imported ('conventional') crude oil.
Newnes	Shale Oil Development Committee	Mining and 200,000 gallons of oil produced using abandoned COC equipment.	1931-early 1932	Site abandoned.
North Newnes (previously called 'The Gullies', later called Glen Davis, on the southern side of the Capertee Valley, south-east of Glen Alice)	Various	Oil shale was identified in the area in 1865. From 1881, there were mines in the area, including an adit known as 'MP1'.	1881–1906	MP1 adit later became the shale mine for Glen Davis.
North Newnes (previously called 'The Gullies', later called Glen Davis, on the southern side of the Capertee Valley, south-east of Glen Alice)	Commonwealth Oil Corporation	An existing tunnel into the shale deposit on the North Newnes (Capertee Valley) side ('Lang's Tunnel') was extended, with the intention of meeting another tunnel being dug from the Newnes (Wolgan Valley) side. Excavated shale was stockpiled at the North Newnes end, ready to be conveyed through the tunnel, but the two tunnels never met.	1906–1908	Work was abandoned at a tunnel length of 4,300 ft (1,300 m) in September 1906. The miners vacated the site by November 1908.
Reedy Creek (Southern Highlands)	Shale Petrol Oil Company Limited	Took mining lease in the area in 1920, as well as at Joadja. Exploratory borehole to delineate resources.	1920–1921	In 1921, 1,915 acres of mining leasehold at Reedy Creek was to be sold to a new venture, Oil Shale Products and Coal Limited, as part of leases that included other land at Joadja. The new venture failed (see Joadja).
Reedy Creek (Southern Highlands)	Reedy Creek Oil and Shale Syndicate / 'A Melbourne syndicate'	The leases at Reedy Creek became available again in 1925. Exploratory tunnel and trial retorting of oil shale. The site was "16 or 17 miles from Mittagong"	1926–1928	In 1928, a report recommended that Sensible Heat Distillation Co of England take over the leases. This entity was associated with L & N Brown Coal Company, an English Company that was also involved in the oil shale industry in Tasmania. The Depression seems to have ended all activity.
Reedy Creek (Southern Highlands)	Shale Oil Products Co-Op Limited	Shale mining to supply a plant at Mittagong.	1941	
Sandy Hollow	Shale Oil Products Co-Op Limited	This organisation—backed by a number of companies with vehicle fleets—was exploiting the shale deposit at Baerami Creek and producing crude oil and 2,000 imperial gallons of petrol per week, moving the shale by road to its retorts at Sandy Hollow. The fuel produced was used by the backers, to overcome a wartime shortage of motor fuel, for their own road vehicles.	1943–1945	The company was in liquidation by June 1945, when its equipment was put up for sale. Production ceased in August 1945. Only viable under wartime conditions.
Torbane (See also Airly)	'King's Mine'	Shale mine.	From uncertain date to 1896	Lease taken up by N.S.W. Shale & Oil Company.
Torbane (See also Airly)	N.S.W. Shale & Oil Company	'King's Mine' shale mine (renamed 'New Hartley mine'), retorts and private branch railway.	1896–1906	N.S.W. Shale & Oil Company was sold to Commonwealth Oil Corporation (see below).
Torbane (See also Airly)	Commonwealth Oil Corporation	Shale mine and retorts. New Pumpherson retorts commenced operation in 1908.	1906–1913	Operations ceased in 1913.
Torbane (See also Airly)	Commonwealth Oil Corporation (managed by John Fell)	The retorts were reopened and production of crude oil resumed.	1916–1918	Production ceased in 1918. Bricks were removed for use at Clyde refinery in 1925.
Torbane (See also Airly)	Torquay and Anglesea Oil Company	Erected retorts and other structures there in but uncertain it started production.	1925–1926	Last attempt to exploit Torbane area shale.
Torbane (See also Airly)	Genders of Lithgow (owners of Great Cobar Colliery, Lithgow)	New retorts at Torbane, processing shale from the Glen Shale mine in the Megalong Valley. Petrol was produced to supply the needs of their own vehicle fleet during wartime fuel shortage.	1941–1944	Only viable under wartime conditions, closed.
Ultimo	N.S.W. Shale & Oil Company	Premises adjacent to the Darling Harbour railway line at Ultimo, where they manufactured grease and lubricating oil. (Probably relocated there after the final closure of the larger refinery at Waterloo / Alexandria).	c1885-?	
Waterloo / Alexandria (Botany Rd)	Western Kerosene Oil Company	Shale retorts and oil refinery, processing oil shale shipped from Hartley Vale. The works was located on 10 acres of land on the western side of Botany Road, "Some three or four hundred yards beyond the Waterloo Tollbar" (The tollbar in 1863, was on Botany Road, near Boundary St.) Being on the western side of the road, its true address was Alexandria, although it was usually stated to be in Waterloo.	c.1868–1872	Company merged with Hartley Kerosene Oil and Paraffine Co. to form N.S.W Shale & Oil Company, which took over operations.
Waterloo / Alexandria (Botany Rd)	N.S.W. Shale & Oil Company	Shale retorts and oil refinery, processing oil shale shipped from Hartley Vale.	1872–c. 1886	Closed after sufficient retorts and oil refinery were set up at Hartley Vale.
Waterloo / Alexandria (Botany Rd)	A.M. Fell and Sons	The refinery continued in operation for some time under a contract with A. M. Fell & Sons (Alexander Morrison Fell). It remained owned by N.S.W. Shale & Oil Company.	c.1886–?	All operations eventually relocated.
Werris Creek	New South Wales Government Railways	Gasworks manufacturing 'shale gas' that was used, in compressed form, for lighting in railway carriages. It was located near Werris Creek railway station. In 1911, the shale was coming from Newnes. In 1887, shale had been sent from Mount Temi, near Murrurundi (see Murrurundi above).(In 1889, shale was also being purchased for other railway gasworks at Bathurst, Junee, Newcastle, and Redfern / Macdonaltown (Everleigh yard, north gasholder).)	1884 to at least 1911	Likely to have been replaced by a petroleum-derived gas such as Pintsch gas, hydrocarbons for which were being made from shale oil at Hamilton by 1913.
Wollar	Australian Imperial Shale Oil Company	Shale mine (intermittent mining) and processing plant using Schultz process, developed by Ernest Schultz of Melbourne (retorts and condensers).	1930–1935	May not have proceeded beyond the demonstration of small commercial-scale plant, on at least two occasions, in 1931 and 1935. The company's freehold land, buildings, machinery, and equipment were advertised for sale in June 1939.

== Queensland ==
Queensland has the largest deposits of oil shale in Australia. Aside from limited activities around the time of the Second World War, there was little done to exploit those resources, until after the 1973 oil crisis. Activity decreased after the fall in oil prices, c. 1986. After that time, the adverse environmental consequences of mining and processing the shale became increasingly significant to public acceptance and government approval. As of 2023, the only active work is on the deposit at Alpha.

The list below shows shale oil operations that have been recorded in Queensland; it may not be a complete list.

Location	Company / Owner	Operations	Period of operation	Fate
Alpha	National Liquid Fuel Society Limited	A society / company was set up and attempts made to raise funds from the public. It held leases for oil shale at Alpha. It carried out development work at Alpha and took ten tons of shale for testing in an experimental retort in Brisbane. The shale was assayed at 150 gallons of oil per ton.	1941–1944	It never entered commercial production, and interest in it appears to have waned with the end of the Second World War.
Alpha	Greenvale Mining Limited / Greenvale Energy Limited	Alpha Torbanite Project – Drilling and test work on resulting core samples containing Torbanite and cannel coal. Tests of a liquefaction process, using bulk samples, as part of work to develop a commercialisation pathway for bitumen production.	c.2019–2023	Ongoing work. (In 2023, the company was also pursuing geothermal energy, as a way to offset potential carbon emissions from its project at Alpha.)
Gladstone Region / 'Rundle Deposit'	Southern Pacific Petroleum and Central Pacific Minerals, with Esso Australia	Rundle Oil Shale Project	c.1973–c. 1987	Esso deferred the project. SPP sold its stake in the venture to Australian Oil-Shale Holdings in 2007.
Gladstone Region / 'Stuart Deposit'	Southern Pacific Petroleum and Central Pacific Minerals, from 1997 with Suncor Energy	Stuart Oil Shale Project, with a pilot plant using the Alberta Taciuk process.	Development 1997–2001 Pilot plant production from 1999	Suncor withdrew in 2001.
Gladstone Region / 'Stuart Deposit'	Southern Pacific Petroleum	Southern Pacific Petroleum and Central Pacific Minerals, merged as Southern Pacific Petroleum.	2003	Company encountered financial difficulties and sold Stuart oil shale assets to Queensland Energy Resources in 2003.
Gladstone Region / 'Stuart Deposit'	Queensland Energy Resources	In 2004, the pilot plant, which had produced 500,000 barrels of oil since opening in 1999, was closed. A new pilot plant based on Paraho II technology was commissioned in 2011.	Production 2004 and 2011	
Julia Creek	Xtract Oil (a subsidiary of Global Oil Shale Group)	Julia Creek project, with proposed use of the Galoter process.	2012	
Postmans Ridge	Joseph Stirling	A deposit of oil shale was found during the sinking of a well. Some shale was carried to Toowoomba, where it was used for town gas enrichment. (In 1930, oil seepage, from a creek bank and in the old well, was taken as a sign that 'free oil' may be present, leading to short-lived interest in the area.)	c.1890	
Rolleston	Vincent Hiske / Carnarvon Ranges Expedition	Experimental retorting of oil shale near the Early Storms Station homestead.	1940	
Whitsunday Region/ Gunyarra (near Proserpine) /'McFarlane Deposit'	Queensland Energy Resources	The area of the Whitsunday Coast Airport and land to its south-east reportedly contains the largest oil shale deposit in Queensland. The company has carried out test drilling in the area.	2008	Later in 2008, the Queensland government imposed a 20-year moratorium on the mining of oil shale in the Whitsunday region.
Yeerongpilly	Transport Fuel and By-Products Syndicate	Erected an 'Anderson process' demonstration plant that produced samples of oil, from oil shale obtained from New South Wales. Deposits at Strathpine and Alpha were considered as possible sources of oil shale.	1946	

== Tasmania ==
Deposits of Tasmanite oil shale were identified in the valley of the Mersey River, in Northern Tasmania, in the 1860s. Oil shale operations took place in this area, between c. 1910 and 1935, producing a total of only 85,000 barrels (13,500 m^{3}). Despite much effort and time, and experiments with different retorting processes, the industry in Tasmania proved not to be economically viable, under the prevailing circumstances and without the government support that did not eventuate.

The list below shows shale oil operations that have been recorded in Tasmania; it may not be a complete list.

Location	Company / Owner	Operations	Period of operation	Fate
Latrobe / Right Bank of Mersey River	Tasmanian Shale Company	Mine and retorts opened in May 1911.	Construction 1910 Operation 1911–1912	Assets and leases sold to Railton-Latrobe Oil Shale Company in 1912, with the company in liquidation.
Latrobe / Right Bank of Mersey River	Railton-Latrobe Oil Shale Company	Mine and retorts. The company added new retorts in 1914, which were later claimed to be faulty and were the subject of litigation in 1916. It was still producing oil in 1916, but attempts were made to have the Tasmanian Government purchase the business. The company's crude oil was being used as 'road dressing' in Tasmania and the first shipment to mainland Australia only happened in 1916. The mine provided shale for use in production of town gas at least as late as 1919.	1912–1916 Shale mining in 1919	In 1917, the Legislative Council of Tasmania rejected purchasing the company's assets, and subsequent attempts to obtain government aid seem to have failed. (A later (1931) company by the name of Railton Latrobe Shale Oil Company, N.L. is unrelated.)
Latrobe / Right Bank of Mersey River	Southern Cross Motor Fuels Company	This company took over the leases of Railton-Latrobe Oil Shale Company and erected retorts. It also built a refinery at Yarraville, Victoria, which started producing in 1922. In June 1924, the workforce was laid off, pending arrival of equipment to a new design. In March 1925, equipment from the dismantled Yarraville refinery arrived for use at Latrobe.	1921–1925	In June 1925, shareholders voted to reconstruct the capital of the company by winding it up and creating a new entity, New Southern Cross Motor Fuels, with increased capital to be raised from existing shareholders.
Latrobe / Right Bank of Mersey River	New Southern Cross Motor Fuels Company	Carried on businesses of former Southern Cross Motor Fuels Company. Reported successful results, in December 1925, of new 'McPherson' retort. Workforce laid off in May 1926, pending a decision on future operations.	1925–1926	The company became interested in the 'Long' process in 1927, and its shareholders became involved in the flotation of the Tasmanite Shale Company (see below).
Latrobe / Right Bank of Mersey River	Tasmanian Cement Company	The company erected mining plant on its lease, to mine oil shale to process, including extracting oil, at its cement works at Railton (refer to Railton, below).	Construction from 1923 Mining 1924–1928	Dorman Long took management control in 1928, and set up a new company (see below).
Latrobe / Right Bank of Mersey River	Goliath Portland Cement Co.	New company to continue the shale mining operations of Tasmanian Cement Company, after Dorman Long took control of that company.	Mining 1928–1931	Oil shale interests merged into reconstructed Tasmanite Oil Company in 1931 (see below).
Latrobe / Right Bank of Mersey River	Tasmanite Shale Company	Acquired the leases of (New) Southern Cross Motor Fuels Company. Operated 'Long' retorts at a site on the opposite side of the river to L & N, around mid-1929. In 1930, its storage was full of crude oil, and it had to shutdown.	1929–1930	Company reconstructed in 1931 (see below).
Latrobe / Right Bank of Mersey River	Tasmanite Shale Company (new entity of same name)	So as to coordinate the shale oil related efforts of various parties, this company was reconstructed, by shareholding, to also take over the shale operations of Goliath Portland Cement Co. (holding an adjacent lease), Mineral Oils Extraction Limited, and Railton Latrobe Shale Oil Company, N.L., in 1931. The new combined approach focused on the 'Crozier' retort that had been introduced to Tasmania by Mineral Oils Extraction.	1931–1935	The 'Crozier' process was not demonstrated at full commercial scale, and a report (L.G. Rogers, ‘Report on the Tasmanian Shale Industry’, September 1932) pointed out this deficiency. Nonetheless, the Commonwealth Government's policy favoured that process for another two years. The last production of shale oil in Tasmania was in 1935.
Latrobe / Left Bank of Mersey River	Australian Shale Oil Corporation / later owned by L & N (Tasmania) Ltd	The company mined shale and operated an American-invented Bronder retort from 1924. By 1927, an extensive shale oil operation existed at Latrobe.	1924–1928	Sold leases and assets to L & N (Tasmania), a subsidiary of L & N Brown Coal Company of England in 1928. Liquidated in 1931.
Latrobe / Left Bank of Mersey River	L & N (Tasmania) Ltd	A German-manufactured 'L & N patent' retort was delivered from England to the Latrobe site, around April 1929, but not installed due to a lack of funds. L & N (Tasmania), was a subsidiary of L & N Brown Coal Company of England in 1928. L & N was also planning to exploit brown coal resources at Lal Lal and Morwell in Victoria.	1928–1931	The English parent company was unable to raise funds for further work in Australia. (See also Shale Oil (Demonstrating) Company below).
Latrobe / Left Bank of Mersey River	Shale Oil (Demonstrating) Company	Company floated by local businessmen to carry on progressing developments begun by Australian Shale Oil Corporation and later L & N. Installed a single full-size Pumpherson retort for a trial, which ran from 29 May to 19 July 1932, processing five tons of shale per day. For commercial production, multiple full-scale retorts would have been necessary.	1931–1932	Shutdown after trial. Commonwealth Government support was critical and the efforts of the Shale Oil (Demonstrating) Company did not receive it. Instead, for the two years to 1935, government policy supported the efforts of Tasmanite Shale Company using the 'Crozier' process.
Railton	Tasmanian Cement Company	Cement works using oil shale from the company's mine at Latrobe, their objective being to provide oil as fuel for the cement works, use the spent shale as an ingredient of the product, and apply the waste heat of the cement kiln to retorting the oil shale (at Railton). The large British company Dorman Long & Co. took an interest in the company in 1924. This involvement was related to Dorman Long's sourcing of cement for construction of the Sydney Harbour Bridge.	1924–1928	Dorman Long took management control in 1928, and set up a new company (see below).
Railton	Goliath Portland Cement Co.	Continuation of the operation of the cement works, using shale from Latrobe to make cement after extracting the oil. The shale oil operations were to become a joint venture with an English company, which was Mineral Oils Extraction Company (see below).	1928–1931	Oil shale interests merged into reconstructed Tasmanite Oil Company in 1931.
Railton	Mineral Oils Extraction Company	Joint venture partner for shale oil operations with Goliath Portland Cement Co.. Introduced the 'Crozier' process to Tasmania. The company had a presence in Australia promoting the 'Crozier' retort from c. 1925.	Presence in Australia from c. 1925 At Railton 1928–1931	Oil shale interests merged into reconstructed Tasmanite Oil Company in 1931.

== Victoria ==
Operations in Victoria were confined to refining of crude oil from shale. The is no record of oil shale being mined in Victoria.

The list below shows shale oil operations that have been recorded in Victoria; it may not be a complete list.

Location	Company / Owner	Operations	Period of operation	Fate
Yarraville	Southern Cross Motor Fuels Company	A refinery, capable of processing 20,000 gallons of crude oil per week, which started producing motor spirit in 1922. (See also the company's operations at Latrobe, Tasmania, above.)	Construction from late 1920 Operation 1922–c. 1925	Dismantled. In March 1925, seventeen truckloads of equipment from the dismantled Yarraville refinery arrived for use at Latrobe.

== Other states and territories ==
There are no recorded commercial shale oil operations that were outside New South Wales, Queensland, Tasmania, and Victoria.

Victoria does have small uneconomic deposits of oil shale. However, there are deposits of oil shale, in other states and territories of Australia, with the exception of the Australian Capital Territory. In the past, there has been some exploration work on the deposits in South Australia, Western Australia, and in the Northern Territory.

== See also ==
- Oil shale in Australia
