= Oil shale in Australia =

Overview of the industry in Australia

There are oil shale deposits in Australia which range from small deposits to large reserves. Deposits, varying by their age and origin, are located in about a third of eastern Australia. In 2012, the demonstrated oil shale reserves were estimated at 58 billion tonnes. The easiest to recover deposits are located in Queensland.

The developments started in the 1860s exploiting deposits in New South Wales and Tasmania. The oil shale industry stopped in 1952 and restarted in the late 1990s. In 2012, one pilot shale oil plant and several development projects operated in Queensland and Tasmania.

== Geology and reserves ==
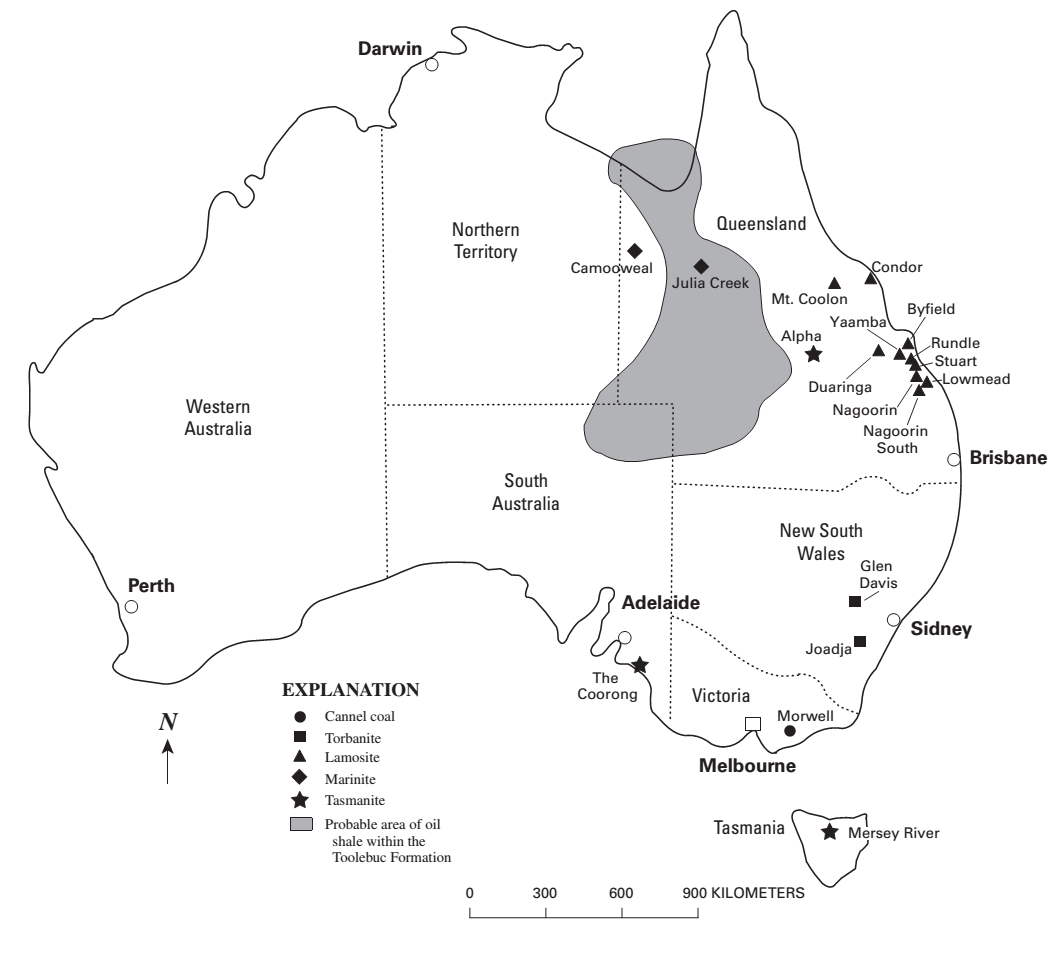
Map of oil shale deposits in Australia

Oil shale deposits, varying by age and origin, are located in Queensland, New South Wales, South Australia, Victoria and Tasmania. As of 2012 the total amount of the demonstrated resource is estimated at 58 billion tonnes. Of this about 25 billion barrels (4.0×10^{9} m^{3}) is recoverable, equating to the world's 8th largest resource.

Oil shale deposits of Queensland and New South Wales are mainly lacustrine (torbanite and lamosite) of Cenozoic deposits, varying in size from 1 to 17.4 billion tonnes, formed in freshwater lakes in grabens, commonly in association with coal-forming swamps. Deposits with the greatest potential for commercial development are the Rundle, Stuart and Condor sites located near Gladstone, Mackay and Proserpine in Queensland. Deposits at Duaringa, Byfield, Mount Coolon, Nagoorin, Yaamba, and smaller Alpha and Carnarvon Creek deposits may also be of economic interest.

The marine-type oil shale tasmanite, located in Tasmania, of Permian age, occurs mainly in the north-western districts, particularly in Latrobe–Railton area.

The marinite of the Toolebuc Formation, Eromanga and Carpenteria basins in Queensland and neighbouring states is from the Early Cretaceous era. The organic matter in this formation, composed largely of bituminite, liptodetrinite and lamalginite, has a hydrogen:carbon ratio about 1.1 ±0.2, which makes it highly aromatic and relatively resistant to conventional retorting technologies. Although the Toolebuc Formation is of low grade, it contains about 1.7 trillion barrels (270×10^{9} m^{3}) of shale oil. It is also a potential source of Uranium and Vanadium. The most easily exploited deposit of the Toolebuc Formation, allowing open-pit mining, is located near Julia Creek.

Other deposits are the Permian Galilee and Bowen basins in Queensland, Eyre Peninsula in South Australia, and an oil shale – heavy mineral sand deposit in southern Western Australia.

== History ==
Oil shale in Australia was referred to for the first time by François Péron, et al., in Voyage de Découverte aux Terres Australes which was published in Paris in 1807, describing what was probably torbanite from the Newnes deposit. Around 1850, oil shale was discovered at Joadja Creek. In 1854, oil shale from the River Lett near Hartley, New South Wales was exhibited at the Paris Exhibition and in 1862, oil shale from Murrurundi, New South Wales was exhibited at the London International Exhibition.

Exploitation started in New South Wales in 1865 and continued intermittently until 1952, 16 torbanite deposits were commercially exploited in New South Wales. yielding approximately four million tonnes of oil shale, mainly used for gas enrichment, petrol/gasoline production, paraffin, kerosene and wood preserving and lubricant production. Australian oil shale was used domestically and exported to Italy, the United Kingdom, the United States and the Netherlands.

The first shale oil was extracted by the Pioneer Kerosene Works at America Creek in Wollongong district in December 1865 by utilizing the "D" retort. By 1868, shale oil extraction had started in Hartley at Kerosene Bay (Port Jackson), Kerosene Vale, and Botany Road by the Hartley Company and the Western Kerosene Oil Company using Hall–Palmer retorts. The two companies merged in 1871 to form the New South Wales Shale Oil Company.

In 1873 mining of Joadja oil shale started for sale to the Australian Gas Light Company for gas enrichment. Oil shale retorting followed in 1881 by utilisation of "D" retorts. The plant closed before 1900.

By 1892, about 100,000 tonnes of oil shale were being processed In Australia annually. In 1896, the New South Wales Shale Oil Company expanded its activities to Torbane near Capertee, New South Wales. This plant was later acquired by the Commonwealth Oil Corporation and Hall–Palmer retorts were replaced by Pumpherston retorts. In 1906, the Commonwealth Oil Corporation started construction of a shale oil plant at Newnes. The new plant also utilised Pumpherston retorts. It was commissioned in 1911, but closed after few months due to technical problems. The plant was acquired and reconstructed by industrialist John Fell, operating until 1922. In 1900, an experimental retort was erected at Mornington, New South Wales. In 1910, the British Australian Oil Company erected a retort at Murrurundi, New South Wales, but it closed shortly afterwards.

In 1917, subsidies for the oil shale industry were introduced, but commercial production in New South Wales ceased in 1925. In the 1920s Vidler & Co. installed a Stockhausen retort at Crown Ridge, Capertee, the Torquay & Anglesea Oil Company erected a Schultz retort at Torbane Siding, and the Australian Imperial Shale Oil Company began operations at Wollar, all of which failed after a short period. In the 1930s, a Gotting retort was erected in Mittagong, New South Wales.

Production resumed before World War II and in 1937, the National Oil Proprietary was created. The Glen Davis Shale Oil Works became operational at Glen Davis, New South Wales in 1940 as the main facility in the country. In addition to Glen Davis, three NTU retorts were operated by Lithgow Oil Proprietary at Marangaroo, New South Wales, during the war. Almost 500,000 barrels of oil were produced by these retorts.

By 1947, about 3% of Australia's gasoline consumption was oil-shale derived, (about 100,000 barrels per year (16,000 m^{3}/a)). After government funding ceased in 1952, the last oil shale operation at Glen Davis was closed. Production did not resume until the Stuart Oil Shale Project in the late 1990s.

In Tasmania, shale oil extraction started in 1910 and ceased in 1935, producing a total of 85,000 barrels (13,500 m^{3}). In 1924, the Australian Shale Oil Corporation was established for construction of a Bronder retort and oil treatment plant at Latrobe, but the operation was not a success and the company was liquidated in 1931. Other Tasmanian oil shale operations were carried out by the Railton-Latrobe Oil Shale Company, the Southern Cross Motor Fuels Company, and the Tasmanian Cement Company.

After the 1973 oil crisis, several companies explored the oil shale resources of Eastern Queensland; however, these activities diminished by 1986 after a drop in oil prices.

Starting in 1995, Southern Pacific Petroleum N.L. and Central Pacific Minerals N.L. developed the Stuart Oil Shale Project, using the Alberta Taciuk process, signing a joint venture agreement in 1997 with the Canadian company Suncor Energy, which left the project in 2002, producing 500,000 barrels (79,000 m^{3}) of shale oil between 1999 and 2004. Under pressure from a sustained campaign by the environment group Greenpeace and facing financial difficulties the project was sold by receivers to the newly formed Queensland Energy Resources. The company announced on 21 July 2004 that the plant would be closed for economic and environmental reasons and dismantled in 2008. A new demonstration plant based on the Paraho II technology opened in September 2011.

In August 2008, Queensland Government announced a review to study environmentally acceptable ways for the oil shale development. In November 2008, a 20-year moratorium was placed on oil shale mining in the Whitsunday Region. The granting of new tenures and variation of existing entitlements relating to oil shale were suspended until considering the oil shale review.

== Recent activities ==
Several companies in Australia have oil shale development plans and activities. Queensland Energy Resources is developing the Stuart deposit. In September 2011, it produced the first oil at its new pilot plant.

Xtract Oil, a subsidiary of Global Oil Shale Group Limited, is one of developers of the Julia Creek deposit. It plans to produce shale oil by using the Galoter process. Australian Thermal Solution, a subsidiary of Blue Ensign Technologies, was planning to build a demonstration plant at Julia Creek to test its Rendall Process.

OilCorp is progressing to development of its oil shale resource located north of Julia Creek within the Toolebuc Formation.

Greenvale Mining, a developer of the Alpha deposit, reviewed the viability of the South Africa-developed Vertical Retort Torbanite processing technology. Boss Energy together with the Fushun Mining Group is planning to develop the Latrobe deposit in Tasmania using the Fushun process.

== See also ==
- List of shale oil operations in Australia
