= Commonwealth Oil Corporation =

British-owned Australian company

Commonwealth Oil Corporation Limited was a British-owned Australian company associated with the production and refining of petroleum products derived from oil shale, during the early years of the 20th century. It is associated with Newnes, Hartley Vale, and Torbane, all in New South Wales. It should not be confused with Commonwealth Oil Refineries, which was a completely separate company, established in 1920, that refined imported crude oil from 1924.

== History ==
The company was registered in December 1905. At that time, it issued £500,000 of preferred ordinary shares with another £225,000 of deferred shares. Another £150,000, in the form of 5½ per cent, debentures was raised, in January 1908, followed by another £265,540 of 6 per cent convertible debenture stock, in July 1909. The company's offices were at 350 George Street, Sydney.

In April 1906, it acquired the existing assets of New South Wales Shale & Oil Company, a company that was producing shale oil at Torbane and Hartley Vale. In 1908, it erected 32 new vertical retorts at Torbane, to the Scottish Pumpherson retort design, while continuing to operate the 40 existing retorts. The Harley Vale retorts closed, around August 1910, and were dismantled, while the refinery there was expanded in that same year.

Commonwealth Oil Corporation made a major investment in the production of shale oil at a site in the Wolgan Valley that they named Newnes, after Sir George Newnes, a director and chairman of the company. A large amount of their English capital—over the lifetime of Newnes, around £1,250,000—was invested to create a vast industrial complex, in what previously had been a near wilderness. With great difficulty, they built a 32 mile (51 km) long railway into the valley—alone costing £150,000—under the supervision of their consultant, Henry Deane. A sizable mining village grew in the valley to house their workforce.

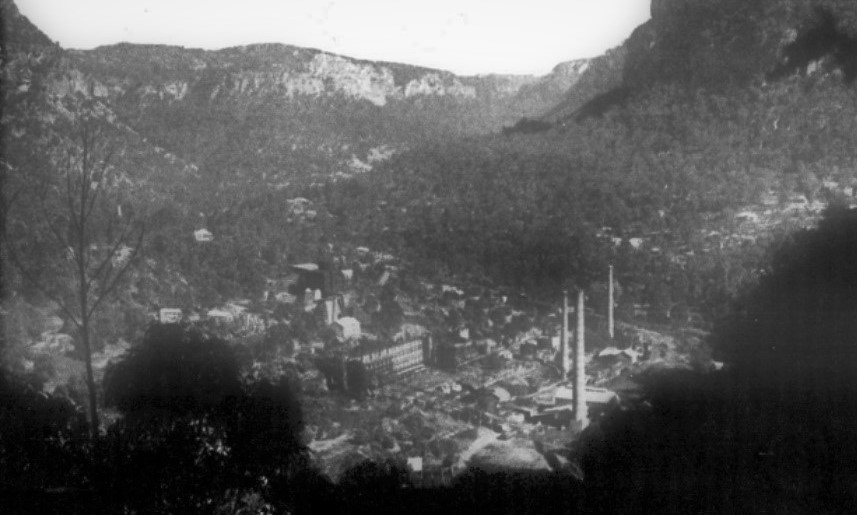
Newnes c.1937, after it finally closed.

Although the oil shale at Newnes had a very high oil content, its seam thickness and depth dictated that it was mined using relatively-costly, conventional, underground mining techniques. There was also a coal seam that could be mined to fuel the processing of shale and crude oil. The coal was of good quality and was also used to make coke. Ammonia was produced, as a byproduct by the shale retorts, and was treated with sulphuric acid to produce ammonium sulphate, which could sold as a fertiliser.

Construction of the Newnes plant had begun in 1906, but the retorts only began working in June 1911. In the intervening years, the company was able to sell readily its high-quality coke to other customers, notably the Eskbank works, of William Sandford and later Charles Hoskins, for use in its blast furnace.

Once the retorts entered production, the company soon encountered technical difficulties with its process and, as well, was subject to numerous and protracted industrial disputes with its workforce, particularly its miners. Retort operation was partially suspended in February 1912 and ceased altogether in March 1913. The retorts had operated for less than two years.

Commonwealth Oil Corporation Ltd. was placed into receivership, in December 1912, with the debenture holders appointing David Fell as receiver. From entering receivership to September 1913, it had lost £24,000 from its Newnes operations alone, and the receiver believed it had been losing at a similar rate prior to entering receivership. The company's capital was reconstructed in April 1913, To avoid a forced sale of assets, another £350,000 would be needed, and second mortgage debenture holders and unsecured debtors had to accept a significant loss.

The mining and retorting operations at Torbane closed around June 1913, and the refinery at Hartley Vale also closed, around August 1913.

The business was administered by John Fell, as its Managing Director, from late 1914. His cousin, David Fell, had been replaced as the receiver in May 1914. John Fell changed the design of the retorts and resumed production, at both Newnes and Torbane. During the First World War, the company received a production bonus from the government. Between March 1915 and October 1917, the Newnes plant produced 3,017,163 gallons of oil, also making, in commercial quantities, locally-refined petrol for motor cars, from around 1917.

The company again raised £100,000 in the form of yet more debentures, in 1919. In the same restructuring of its capital, John Fell contributed working capital, received 1,000,000 preferred ordinary shares, and won an agreement for a half share of any profits for a ten year period to October 1929.

Ultimately, the high cost of mining and the availability of cheap conventional crude oil, from Borneo, were the causes of the final closure of the last operations at Newnes in 1923. The assets of the Commonwealth Oil Corporation were put up for sale in 1927, eventually being sold in 1930. It was deregistered as a company in May 1930.

Talk of reopening Newnes continued, throughout the 1930s, with some mining activity and oil production in 1931 and early 1932—by the government-backed Shale Oil Development Committee— but, after that, shale oil production at Newnes never resumed.

Some ruins of its once vast shale oil works still exist, at what is now the ghost town of Newnes, but are somewhat obscured by bushland regrowth. One of the two tunnels on the old mountain railway route is well-known, as the Glowworm Tunnel. The bell of one of the Shay locomotives that worked the railway is now used as a church bell at All Saints Anglican Church in the Canberra suburb of Ainslie.

== See also ==
- List of shale oil operations in Australia
- British-Australian Oil Company
