= Australian Kerosene Oil Company =

Australian Kerosene Oil Company or 'A.K.O' (originally Australian Kerosene Oil and Mineral Company Limited) mined and processed oil shale to produce kerosene, paraffin wax and candles, lubricating oil and greases, and other petroleum-based products, in New South Wales Australia. It is particularly associated with the site of its mine and works, at Joadja. At times, it also had other mining operations, at Airly and near Katoomba, and a soap and candle factory at Camellia. The company used the brand name 'Southern Cross' for its kerosene products.

== Origins ==
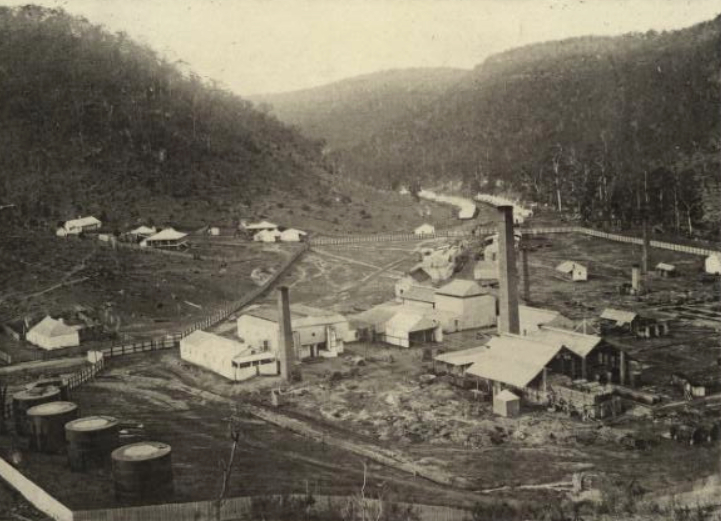
Joadja works (c.1885).

After the discovery of oil shale in the valley of Joadja Creek, several parties began separate mining operations there. Interests associated with John de Villiers Lamb (1833-1900) and his partners began to buy out other separate mining leases. In 1876, the partners brought in James Walter Fell (1847–1882), an expert in the shale oil industry, as a consultant at Joadja. Fell had been manager of Western Kerosene Oil Co. at Hartley Vale, manager of Hartley Vale's oil refinery at Waterloo, and was a founder of the North Shore Gas Company in Sydney. A crucial decision was taken to process the shale in retorts to be built at Joadja, rather than ship the shale to retorts elsewhere.

The partners hired an expert manager, James Fell's uncle, Alexander Morrison Fell (1825–1890), as the manager at Joadja, from 1877 to 1881. He had experience in the Scottish oil shale industry and at Mount Kembla, where he was manager for the American Creek Oil Co., until 1877.

== The operating companies ==
Operations were run initially by Lamb, Parbury and Co., but the partners sought to create a new company with a larger capitalisation. In 1878, the partners established the Australian Kerosene Oil and Mineral Company and John de Villiers Lamb became chairman of its board of directors.

In February 1891, a new company took over operations. It seems likely that this change was triggered by events leading to the acquisition of additional mining operations near Katoomba, in 1890 and 1891. Shares in 'Australian Kerosene and Oil' were quoted on the stock exchange, for the first time, in June 1892. The old company was close to being completely wound up, by January 1896. The new company became better known as Australian Kerosene Oil Company or 'A.K.O', but the old name, Australian Kerosene Oil and Mineral Company, was also still used on occasion.

== History of operations, technology and products ==
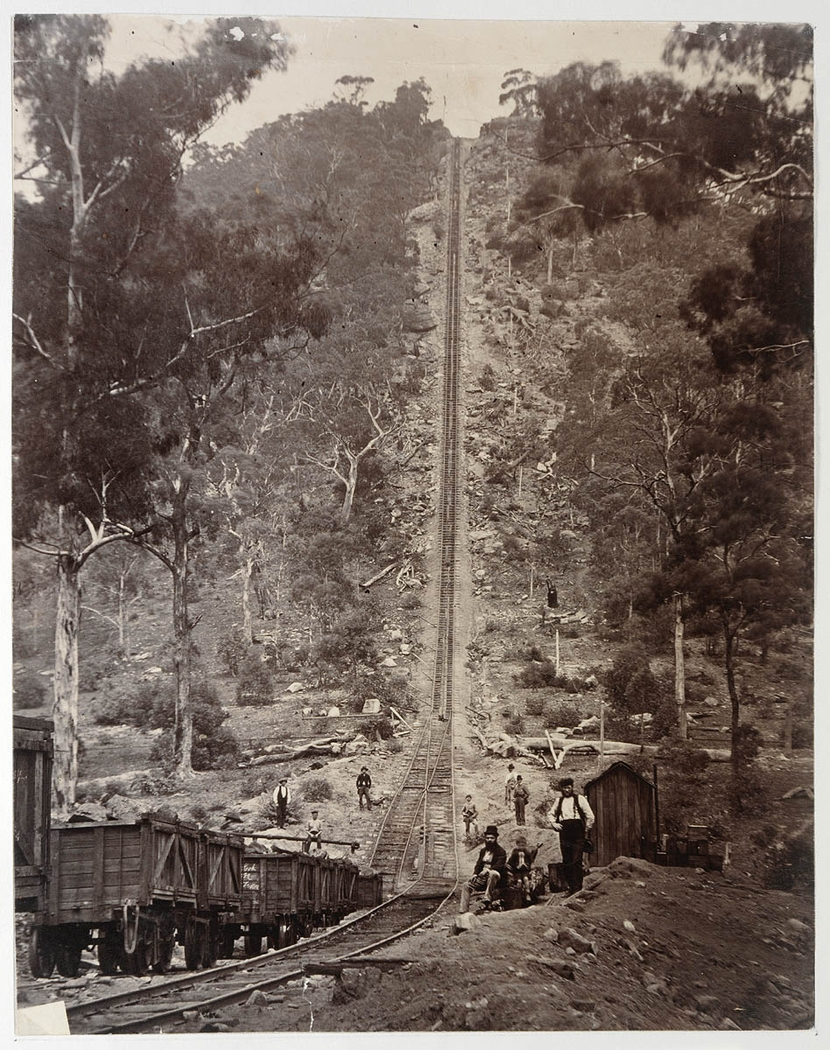
Incline at Joadja, c.1885 (August Tronier)

=== Joadja ===
Retorts and an extensive refinery, in addition to the shale mines, were located in the valley of Joadja Creek, a right-bank tributary of the Wingecarribee River. The site produced kerosene and candles. These operations continued from 1878 to 1896, and mining operations seem to have been restarted briefly, in 1901-1902.

A mining village grew in the valley. Access to the valley floor was by an incline railway. In 1880, a 14 km long narrow-gauge railway was opened to connect the incline with the Main South railway at Mittagong. The rails used on the railway were notable as being rolled at the Fitzroy Iron Works, using wrought iron manufactured there from local raw materials. The railway closed in 1904, but was still intact in 1911.

=== Works at Camellia (Sandown) ===
Between 1887 and around 1901, the company had a works making soap and candles, at what is now Camellia, then better known as Sandown. The works lay on riverfront land between the Parramatta River and the tram line to the Redbank Wharf. The raw materials used were made at Joadja and came from there by rail, via Mittagong and the Sandown railway line. Changes in the import duty on candles led to the local candle manufacturing operation becoming uneconomic, and the works closed. It was for sale in February 1902.

=== Katoomba, Megalong and Jamison Valleys ===
In 1890, the company purchased the old Glen Shale Mine, in the Megalong Valley. In 1891, the company leased the operations of Katoomba Coal and Shale Company, the Ruined Castle shale mines, in the Jamison Valley. Significant investments were made, including construction of two tunnels, which linked the shale tramway operations in the two valleys to the base of the inclined railway, from the valley to the Main West railway at Katoomba. The operations were beset with industrial troubles, had limited mining lives, and failed to meet expectations.

In 1903-1904, the company restarted its mining operations near Katoomba. Operations at the Glen shale mine appear to have been confined to relaying its tramway connection and using it to remove a large stockpile of second-grade oil shale that had been mined during previous operations. The Ruined Castle mines were reopened and operated briefly.

=== Airly ===
In 1895, the mining leases covering the Genowlan Mine at Airly were taken over by Australian Oil Syndicate. Until around 1904, the mine was operated by the Australian Kerosene Oil Company for payment of a royalty. There were two mines—New Hartley, operated by the rival New South Wales Shale and Oil Co., and A.K.O.'s Genowlan Mine—sharing different parts the same seam of oil shale, and a dispute arose, which was won by New South Wales Shale and Oil Company. By mid 1904, A.K.O. operations at the Genowlan mine had ceased, although mining, by others, at Airly, occurred for some years thereafter to supply the Torbane retorts.

== Demise and legacy ==
With the future prospects of the mine and works at Joadja becoming doubtful, the company began mining shale at other locations (see above). Changes in import duties—in 1902, the duty on imported kerosene was removed— affected the viability of the company's refining and candle manufacturing operations, which closed. Without Joadja and refining and manufacturing operations, the company was unable to retain the scale of its previous operations. After 1904, it had effectively ceased to mine oil shale.

The company still had its extensive landholdings at Joadja and Camellia. The Joadja Valley continued to produce fruit from orchards planted by the company; the company set up an evaporator for producing dried fruit and considered setting up a fruit-canning plant.

In 1906, shareholders voted to wind up the company. The company's land at Camellia (Sandown) was sold in 1908. The new owners were still attempting to sell the buildings and equipment still on the site, in 1916. The company was still in liquidation, when the Joadja Creek property was sold, in 1911 and at least as late as September 1926. Oil shale was again mined in the Joadja valley, by others, briefly in 1920-1922, and again during the Second World War.

The main legacy of the company are the extensive ruins at Joadja. The site contains the only extant large ruin of the horizontal 'D section' shale retorts that dominated industry practice prior to the invention of more efficient vertical retorts.

== See also ==
- New South Wales Shale and Oil Company
- List of shale oil operations in Australia
