= British Australian Oil Company =

Former shale oil company of Australia

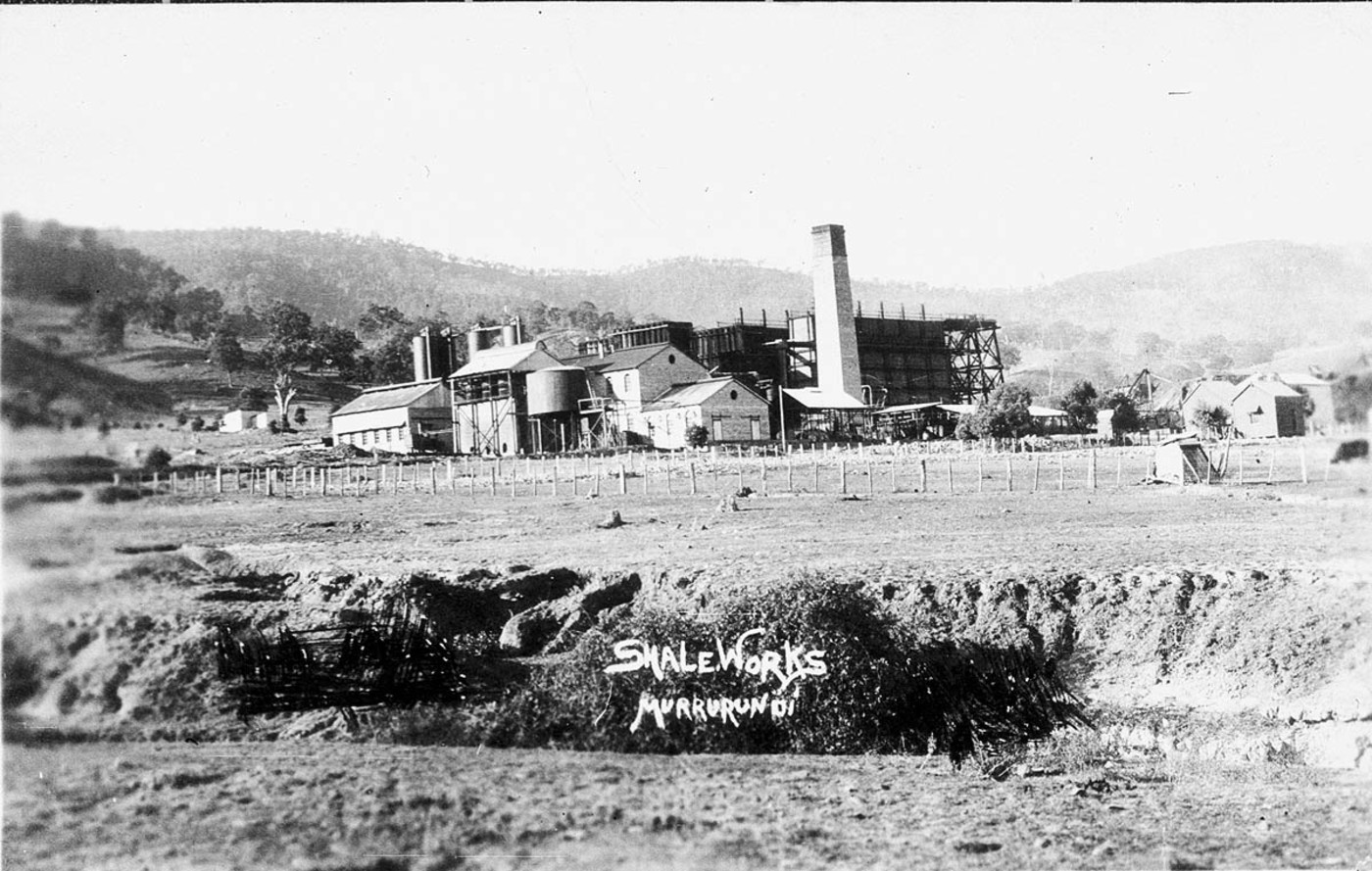
The retorts of British Australian Oil Co. at Murrurundi (Mitchell Library, State Library of N.S.W.)

The British Australian Oil Company Limited was a British-owned company—incorporated in 1910—that mined oil shale and produced shale oil and refined oil products, in New South Wales, Australia, during the years from 1911 to 1915.

== Origins ==
The precursor of the company was the Australian Shale Syndicate Limited, which had been registered in 1895 and had purchased the remaining period of some 20-year oil shale leases, for £25,000. Until 1904, it had leased its oil shale properties, at Airly, to Australian Kerosene Oil & Mineral Company, for a royalty payment of seven shillings per ton of the shale mined. In 1905, it took over oil shale leases at Mount Temi near Murrurundi and from around 1906 it was verifying and planning to exploit that resource.

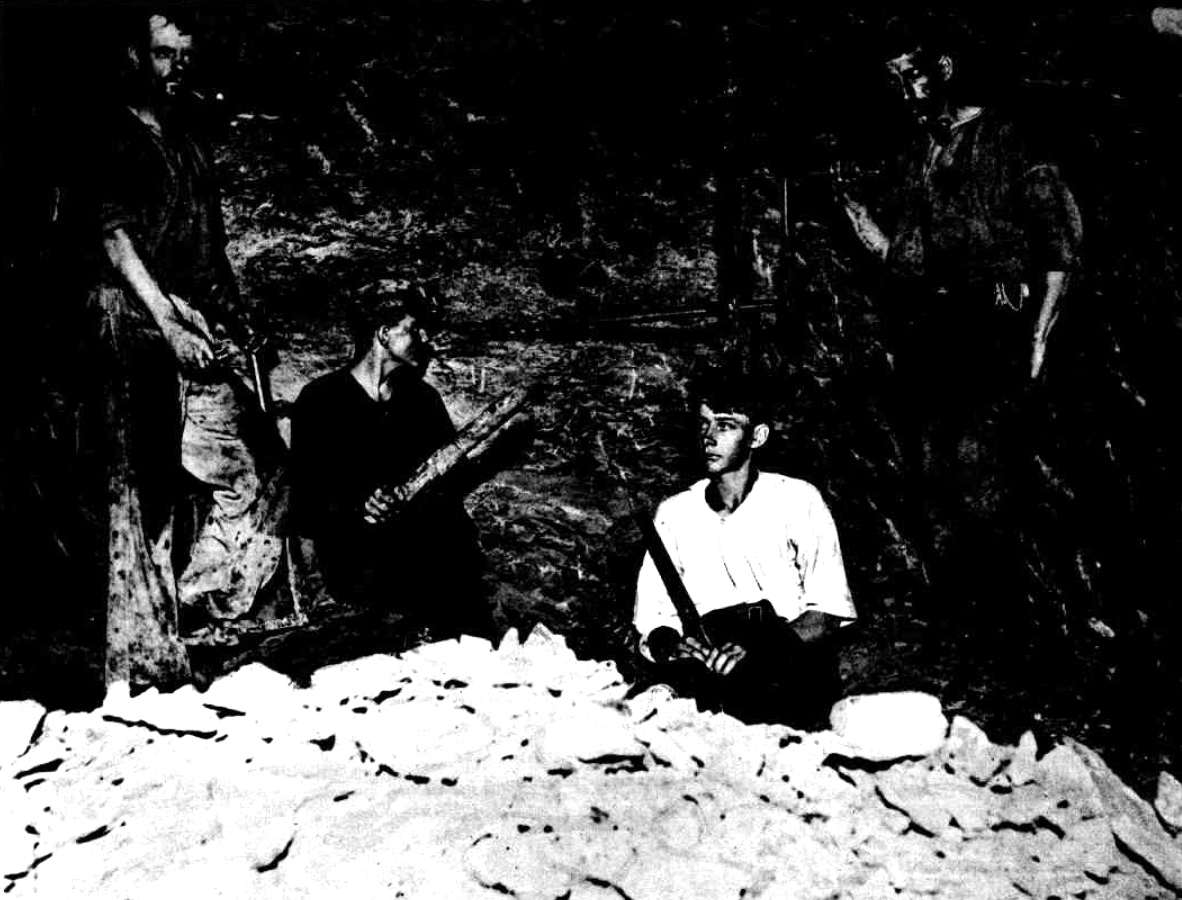
Miners working in the mine at Mount Temi (c.1909).

The presence there of oil shale had been known, since at latest around 1872. The seams of shale at Mount Temi were between four and six feet in total thickness, consisting of a lower seam of 'export quality' shale, around 22 inches thick and essaying 110 to 130 imperial gallons of crude oil per long ton, and an upper seam of lower-quality oil shale that was nonetheless viewed as suited to shale oil production, if worked in conjunction with the richer 'export quality' shale. By December 1906, it was seeking permission for the construction of a branch railway that would run along Elizabeth Street, Murrurundi, and was considering the means to bring the shale from Mount Temi over Page Mountain. In May 1907, it was seeking to set up a company to raise capital.

By mid 1907 development of the mine was well underway, with 13 men working there. Fifty acres of land had been set aside for a settlement near the mine, and there were already four bark huts and a tent there for accommodating the miners. By September 1908, a main haulage tunnel extended 400m into the seam.

In March 1910, the Australian Shale Syndicate sold its oil shale properties to a newly floated British company, the Australian Oil Company, for £130,000. The new company had a nominal capital of £300,000, of which £170,000 was available as working capital. The Australian Oil Company—after finding that a company of that name already existed in Australia—changed its name, around mid-1910, to the British Australian Oil Company.

== History of operation, technology, and products ==
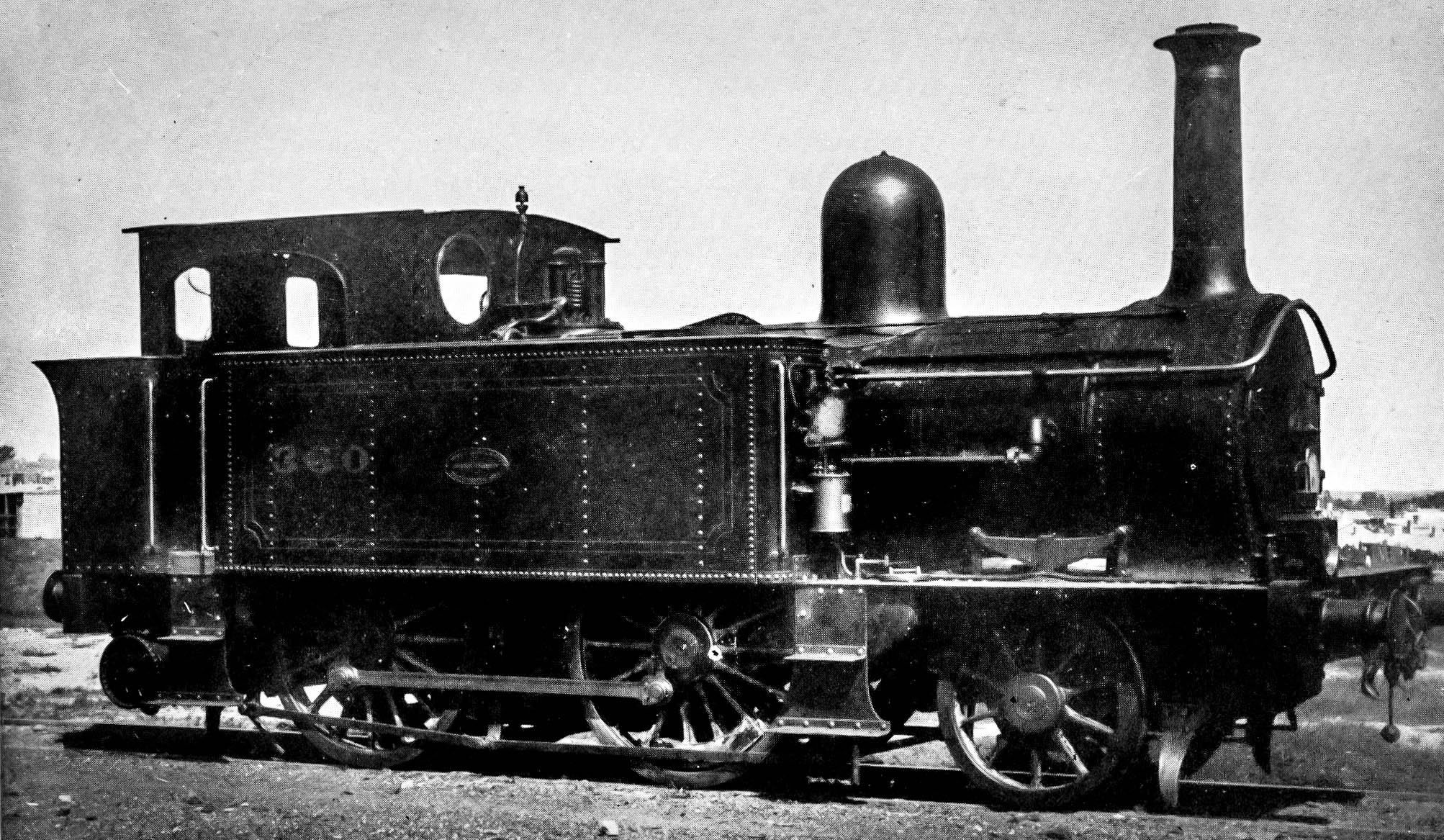
A locomotive of the same type that was used on the private branch railway at Murrurundi. Another shale oil producer, Commonwealth Oil Corporation, used this locomotive, 360, at Torbane, where it would have hauled crude oil made using oil shale from the BAOC's Glenowlan Mine, at Airly.

The British Australian Oil Company's operations near Murrurundi consisted of a shale mine at Mount Temi (north of Murrurundi), a 3½ mile (5.6 km) long, 'Bleichert'-type double-rope aerial ropeway carrying mined shale, and retorts at the base of Page Mountain (close to Murrurundi). The retorts were vertical retorts of the 'Young and Fyfe' type. The retort site was connected via a one mile (1.6 km) long private branch railway, which passed over a twenty-span timber bridge that crossed Pages River and ended at an exchange siding near Temple Court railway station on the Main North railway line. The branch line was worked by a single tank locomotive owned by the company, the former NSWGR locomotive 353. Crude oil produced in the retorts was first stored in two large tanks, of 30,000 gallons each, and then sent in company-owned tank wagons to a refinery that was located in the Newcastle suburb of Hamilton. The retorts also produced ammonia, as a by-product, which was used to produce ammonium sulphate. For use in the process to produce the ammonia and for other purposes, water was drawn from Pages River, through a pipeline to a reservoir near the retorts. The refinery made kerosene, gas, lubricating oils, paraffin wax, greases, and other products. It was located west of Hamilton Junction, adjacent to the Newcastle gasworks, and employed 100 men on its 20 acre site.

Included in the assets acquired from the Australian Shale Syndicate were two oil shale mines located far from Murrurundi. The company operated a mine close to the railway line south of Capertee—the Crown Ridge mine—from which oil shale was supplied for town gas enrichment. It operated the Glenowlen Mine at Airly, in the same region, which supplied the Commonwealth Oil Corporation's retorts at nearby Torbane, until those retorts closed in mid 1913.

Work on building the works at Murrurundi began in August 1910. In early 1912, the company remained optimistic; crude oil production had started later than originally planned, but nonetheless had commenced in October 1911, and products were in the market ahead of the date given in the prospectus. In April 1912, fifty tons of fuel oil was sold to the Royal Australian Navy to trial its suitability on the destroyer HMAS Parramatta.

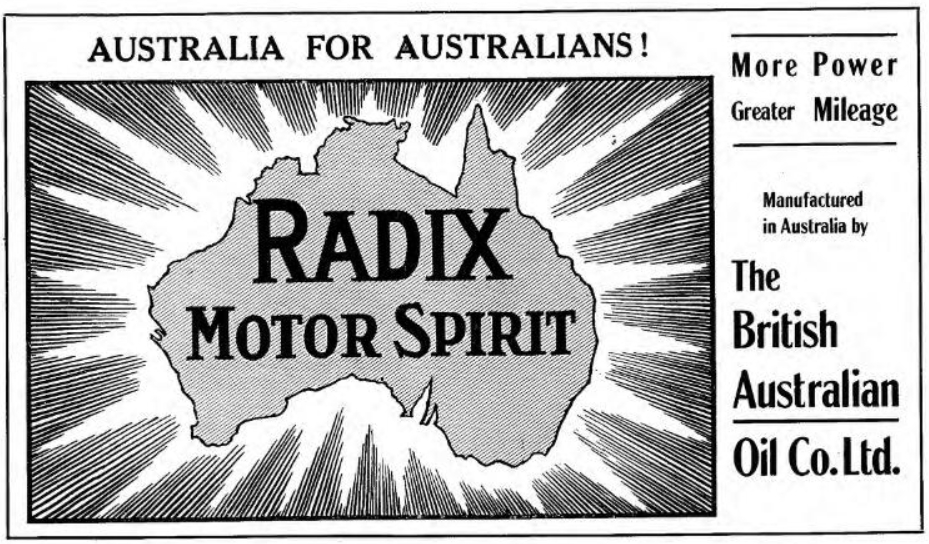
Advertisement (June 1912)

In November 1912, the company made a successful issue of debentures and raised £150,000. The money was to be used to increase the number of retorts, by adding two more benches of retorts, with the intention being to treble the production of crude oil. However, the company’s managing director visited Australia, in mid 1913, and provided a pessimistic report to shareholders of the shale reserves and future prospects. The company was to claim that it had been severely impacted by a strike of its workers at Mount Temi and Murrurundi, in February 1913, which had resulted in the retorts needing to be stopped and allowed to cool. The industrial trouble resulted to a large extent from disagreement between various unions, a demarcation dispute, rather than a dispute between unions and management.

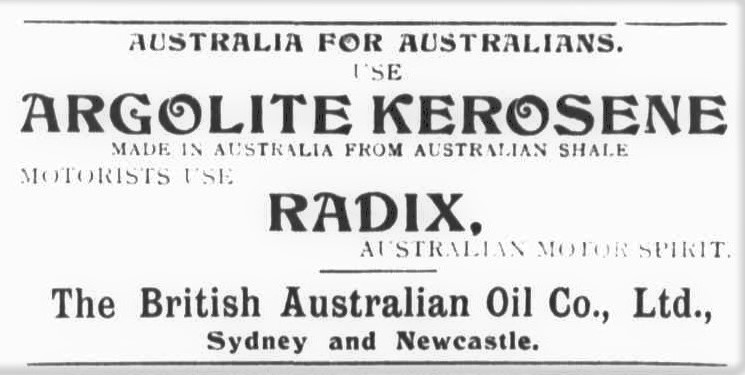
Advertisement (December 1912)

The type of vertical retort design used at Murrurundi, 'Young and Fyfe', had a lower efficiency and higher operating cost than its contemporary, the 'Pumpherson retort.' A small quantity of coal was needed for initial process heating at the refinery and to initiate the pyrolisis reaction in each retort; the company did not have its own coal mine, but the refinery and retorts were well-located to be supplied with coal by rail.

By mid 1913, British Australian Oil had produced nearly 2,000,000 gallons of oil and its product range included, "Benzoline, motor spirit, benzine, heavy naphtha, "Argollte" first-grade kerosene, "Temillto" second-grade kerosene, Pintsch gas-making kerosene, light gas oil, fuel oil, Diesel engine oil, light lubricating oil, medium lubricating oil, heavy lubricating oil, cylinder oil, still grease, axle grease, compounded lubricating oils, wood preserving oil, paraffin wax, sulphate of ammonia." The company used the brand name "Radix" for its motor spirit, which was among the earliest petrol car engine fuel produced commercially in Australia.

By October 1914, the expansion was complete, and once again there was optimism that profitable operation would be achieved. Ominously, it was foreshadowed that £20,000 to £50,000 more in capital may be needed. The workforce associated with the company's operations saw Murrurundi's population peak, around 1914. There was a small settlement, of company-owned cottages, near the Mount Temi mine site, where there was a provisional school from 1911 to 1915.

== Demise and aftermath ==
In November 1914, the debenture holders appointed a receiver, although the company’s management were insisting that this was only as a temporary measure, due to withdrawal of banking facilities in Australia. News that employees’ wages had not been paid—potentially putting the debenture holdings at risk—appears to be what caused the debenture holders to bring in a receiver. A large fire at the Hamilton refinery, on 3 February 1915, was probably the last straw, because all operations at Murrurundi and Hamilton had closed by March 1915. Work had already ceased at the Crown Ridge mine, in the Capertee Valley, during February 1915.

The receivers were selling off movable assets and remaining stocks of oil in mid 1916. After standing unused for some years, the major assets were put up for sale in 1919, by the trustee for the debenture holders. In September 1922, it was announced by Commonwealth Oil Refineries that "a considerable portion of the British Australian Oil Company's plant at Newcastle and Murrurundi had been bought from the liquidators of that company, and transferred to the refinery site". They removed equipment from the refinery at Hamilton, during 1923, for reinstallation at their new oil refinery at Laverton, Victoria. It was not the end of the Hamilton oil works site, and it was being used again, by others, for shale oil production—using shale mined at Barigan—as late as the later years of the Second World War. The Hamilton refinery site later was used by Shell as a fuel depot, until 2014.

The British Australian Oil Company Limited, which had been in receivership since November 1914, was deregistered in 1933. Unlike its contemporary rival shale oil producer, Commonwealth Oil Corporation, it had not been overcapitalised, it had erected its retorts and refinery in sensible locations near to existing population centres and transport links, and it had erected its plant and entered operation quickly. Nonetheless, the company had been unable to operate profitably.

In 1923, Australian Shale Oil Pty Ltd took up the Mount Temi shale leases. The Australian Shale Oil Corporation Ltd. was formed in 1924, with the intention of using the capital raised in its float to exploit the Mt Temi resource, using the American-invented Bronder retorting process. However, before significant work was done at Murrurundi, the company was approached by the Tasmanian Government seeking to interest it in exploiting oil shale deposits in Tasmania. The company subsequently set up its mining and shale oil extraction operations, near Latrobe in the Mersey Valley area of Tasmania, and there was no revival of the oil shale industry at Murrurundi.

According to a contemporary report, the Murrurundi plant was partially dismantled around 1923—its aerial ropeway had been dismantled and sold, at some time prior to May 1923—but its final end seems to have come when the remaining plant was demolished in 1929, probably for scrap. The branch railway was lifted in 1931.

== Remnants ==
A part of the branch railway's formation, between the existing Main North railway and Pages River, is still discernible, as a curved embankment. Another part of the old railway route is Elizabeth Street in Murrurundi. At the site of the retorts, on land to the north of modern-day Doughboy Street, in 2015, there were ruins of some brick structures and the foundation of the terminal point of the aerial ropeway. Otherwise, there is little remaining of the shale oil works at Murrurundi or the refinery at Hamilton.

The collection of the Powerhouse Museum includes a piece of oil shale and 47 bottles containing oil samples, all produced by the British Australian Oil Company.

== See also ==
- List of shale oil operations in Australia
- Commonwealth Oil Corporation
