= Clyde Refinery =

Crude oil refinery in New South Wales, Australia

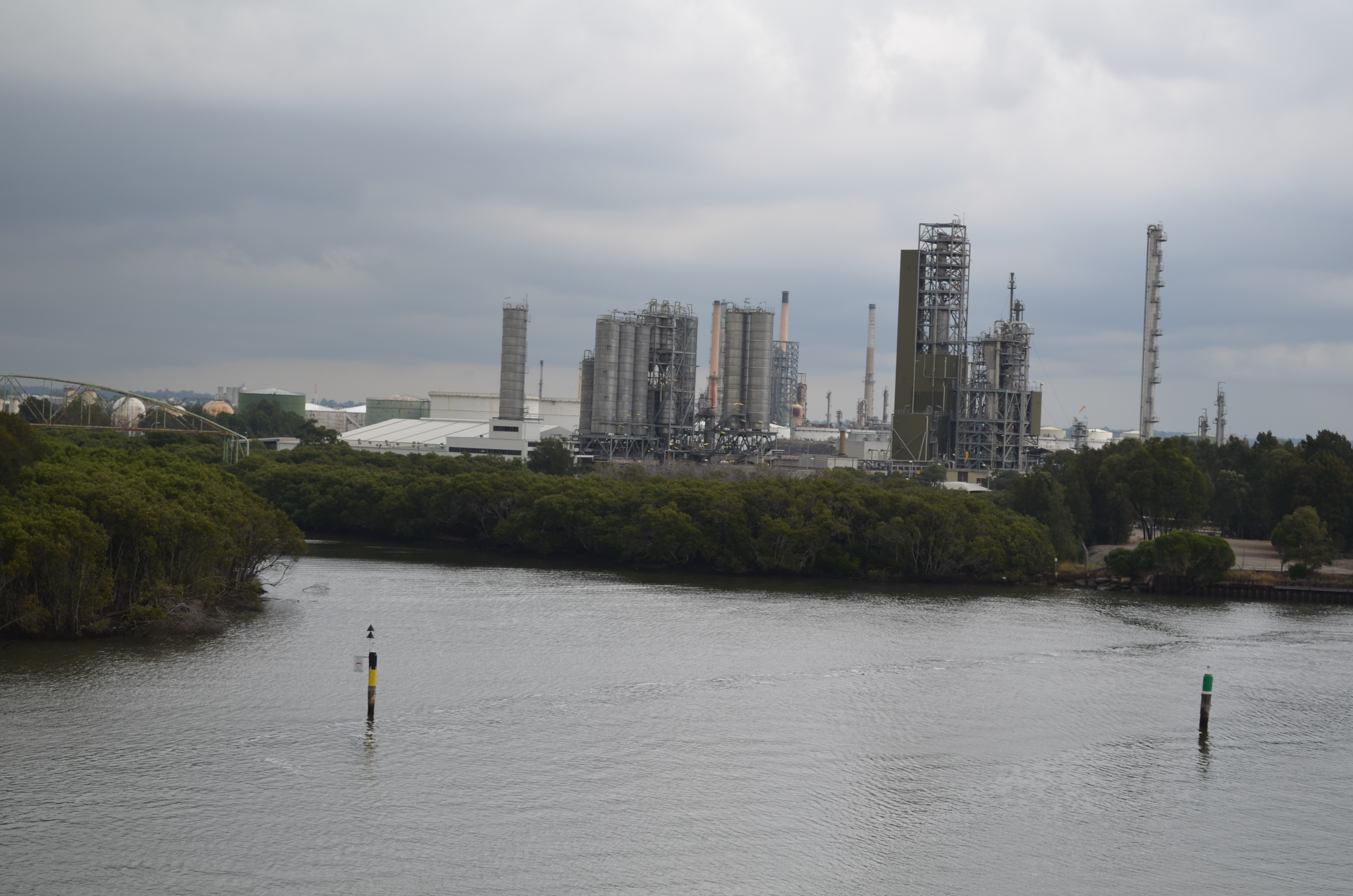
- Location: Clyde, New South Wales, Australia

Refinery details
- Operator: Shell Refining
- Owner: Shell Australia
- Opened: 1926
- Closed: 2013
- Capacity: 85,000 barrels per day (13,500 m^{3}/d)
- No. of employees: 330 (2013)
- Refining units: crude distillation unit, high vacuum distillation unit, fluid catalytic cracker, alkylation unit, platformer unit, HDS unit, hydrotreater, benzene reduction unit, utilities, recovery plant

The Clyde Refinery was a crude oil refinery located in Clyde, New South Wales, Australia, operating between 1925 and 2013. At the time of its closure it had a refinery capacity of 85,000 barrels per day (13,500 m^{3}/d) and was the oldest operating oil refinery in Australia. It was operated by Shell Australia.

== History ==
The Clyde Refinery was built by John Fell and Company Pty Ltd in 1925. It was constructed largely from plant and materials relocated from a shale oil refinery the company had operated at Newnes and old shale retorts at Torbane, both north of Lithgow. The refinery was purchased by Shell Australia in 1928, who would continue to operate the refinery throughout the rest of its existence. The refinery was located in Clyde where the Parramatta River and the Duck River converge, 16 kilometres (9.9 mi) west of the Sydney central business district.

In 1948 Shell opened the first major bitumen refinery in Australia at Clyde, with a production capacity of 35,000 tons p/a of bitumen and 10,000 tons p/a of finished lubricants. The plant had originally been planned in 1938 but construction was delayed due to World War 2.

The refinery was expanded significantly between 1959 and 1968, as part of Australia's post war industrial growth. This included the construction of a Catalytic Reforming Unit or Platformer in 1958, a High Vacuum Distillation Unit (HVU) in 1962, a Catalytic Cracking Unit (CCU) and a Polymerisation Unit in 1963, an Alkylation Unit and a Sulphur Recovery Unit in 1964 and a new Crude Distillation Unit (CDU) in 1967. By the end of 1968 the refinery's workforce had grown to over 1,000 employees, including 120 maintenance workers. Shell deliberately hired a large number of ex-naval personnel to work at the refinery in this period, leading to the site being jokingly referred to as 'HMAS Clyde'.

The expansion of the refinery continued into the 1970s, albeit at a slower rate, with the commissioning of an additional Platformer Unit in 1971 and a second Sulphur Recovery Unit in 1978. The refinery was also the site of the first polypropylene (PP) plant in Australia, which was commissioned by Shell in 1970–1971 and had a capacity of 25,000 tonnes per year.

During the 1980s the refinery went through a period of major rationalisation, with a large number of refinery units closed or merged. Between 1983 and 1984 the refinery's chemical plants were closed, including the Chemical Solvents plant, Hydrocarbon Solvents plant, Epikote plant and Ethylene plant, resulting in redundancies for approximately 120 plant operators, as well as the warehouse storemen who had been responsible for packaging and distributing the refinery's chemical products.

During the 2000s increased government regulation of fuel quality and environmental standards necessitated a number of upgrades to the refinery's existing plant. The refinery's hydrodesulphurisation (HDS) unit was upgraded in 2001 and again in 2008 to reduce the sulphur content of diesel, while in 2004 a new Benzene Reduction Unit (BRU) was built to lower benzene levels in gasoline. In 2008 a major upgrade of the refinery's catalytic cracking unit was also carried out.

In April 2011 Shell announced it intended to shut down refining operations at Clyde and convert the Clyde Refinery and Gore Bay Terminal into a fuel import facility, pending board and employee consultation. The decision was confirmed on 27 July 2011, with all refining activity on the site to cease by mid-2013. This was later brought forward 9 months and the refinery closed in 2012, before then being converted into an import terminal.

Refinery operators at Clyde were members of the Coastal Districts Branch of the Federated Engine Drivers and Firemen's Association (FEDFA), which later merged into the CFMEU Mining and Energy Division. Maintenance employees were represented by the Amalgamated Metal Workers Union and the Electrical Trades Union, while clerical employees were members of the Federated Clerks Union. Other unions represented at the refinery included the Federated Ironworkers Association (FIA), the Australasian Society of Engineers (ASE), the Storemen and Packers Union, the NSW Fire Brigade Employees Union (NSWFBEU) and the Association of Draughting, Supervisory and Technical Employees (ADSTE).

== Technical features ==
At the time of its closure the refinery employed around 570 workers (including contractors) and had a processing capacity of 85 thousand barrels per day (13.5×10^{3} m^{3}/d) or around 4 million tonnes of crude oil annually. Although relatively small in terms of refining capacity by modern standards, Clyde was a highly flexible plant capable of refining a broader range of crude types than most other Australian refineries (predominantly designed to accommodate light, sweet Australian crudes) and was capable of changing its crude feedstock slate up to three times a day to meet changing demand.

The refinery's product slate was composed of approximately 45% motor gasoline, 25% diesel fuel and 25% jet fuel with the remainder consisting of fuel oil and LPG. The refinery usually supplied around 40% of Sydney's fuel requirements and 50% of the fuel consumed in New South Wales. The refinery was connected by pipeline to distribution terminals in Newcastle, the Vopak terminal at Port Botany and by a dedicated jet fuel pipeline to Sydney Airport.

Crude oil was supplied to the refinery from the nearby Gore Bay Terminal, also operated by Shell since its opening in 1901. The terminal is located on a 10 hectares (25 acres) plot of land in Greenwich on Sydney Harbour and was connected to the refinery via a 19 kilometres (12 mi) underground pipeline with a 300 millimetres (12 in) diameter. When the refinery was operating the terminal received approximately 90 crude oil tankers per year.

At the time of its closure in late 2013 the polypropylene plant was owned by LyondellBasell and had an annual production capacity of 170,000 tonnes.
