= Laguna Resources =

Australian mining company

- Type: public
- Traded as: ASX: LRC
- Industry: Mining
- Predecessor: Southern Pacific Petroleum
- Founded: 6 February 1968
- Headquarters: West Perth, Western Australia
- Area served: Australia, Chile
- Key people: Matthew Wood, Chairman; Nick Lindsay, CEO
- Website: www.lagunaresources.com

Laguna Resources NL (former name: Southern Pacific Petroleum NL) was an Australian mineral exploration and mining company. It explored and developed gold and silver projects in the Maricunga Gold Belt of Northern Chile. It was a developer of the Stuart Oil Shale Project.

== History ==
Southern Pacific Petroleum NL was incorporated on 6 February 1968 as an oil company. It was listed on the Australian Securities Exchange on 16 May 1968.

=== Oil shale activities ===
Since 1973, the main activity of the company was an oil shale exploration and shale oil extraction. In the mid 1980s, Southern Pacific Petroleum NL and Central Pacific Minerals NL (CPM) formed a joint venture with Esso Australia to develop the Rundle oil shale deposit in Queensland. The active development of the Rundle deposit ceased in late 1980s when Esso deferred of the project.

In 1997 SPP/CPM signed a joint venture agreement with the Canadian company Suncor Energy to develop the Stuart oil shale deposit. Suncor was designated as the project operator. In April 2001, Suncor left the project and SPP/CPM became the sole shareholder of the project. In February 2002, SPP and CPM merged and SPP became the holding company for the group's interests, including the Stuart Oil Shale Project.

=== Financial difficulties ===
On 25 October 2003, the trade with SPP's share was suspended due financial difficulties of the company. As SPP had granted fixed and floating charges in favor of Sandco Koala LLC in May 2003, the chargee appointed receivers of SPP on 2 December 2003. On 13 February 2004, the Stuart Oil Shale Project and other assets were sold by receivers to the newly formed company Queensland Energy Resources. The most important remained asset was the stake in the Rundle joint venture, which was sold on 11 May 2007 to Australian Oil-Shale Holdings.

=== Recapitalization ===
In September 2007, the proposal of recapitalization of the company by Ascent Capital was accepted and on 28 May 2008, shareholders approved the recapitalization. At the same time all interests held by third parties in the Glassford Tenement, Central Queensland, were transferred to SPP and the company focused on exploration and development of mineral resources.

In 2008, the company's shares were reinstated to quotation. To reflect the change of its core activities, the company changed its name to Laguna Resources in 2009.

=== Takeover ===
The company's shares were delisted in February 2012 following a successful takeover by Kingsgate Consolidated Limited.

== Activities ==
=== Glassford Tenement ===
The Glassford Tenement, approximately 136 hectares (1.36 km^{2}), is located 70 kilometres (43 mi) south of Gladstone and 15 kilometres (9.3 mi) southwest of Nargoorin, Central Queensland. The mineralization zone consists of a series of copper-silver-gold bearing skarn lodes. Laguna Resources intended to commence a work program to test the major geochemical anomaly areas for potentially economic mineralization.
