= Stuart Oil Shale Project =

Oil shale project in Yarwun, Queensland, Australia

- Country: Australia
- Location: Yarwun near Gladstone, Queensland
- Coordinates: 23.786652°S 151.146809°E
- Status: Operational
- Construction began: 1999; 2011
- Decommission date: 2004
- Owner: Queensland Energy Resources

The Stuart Oil Shale Project is an oil shale development project in Yarwun near Gladstone, Queensland, Australia. It is Australia's first major attempt since the 1950s to restart commercial use of oil shale. The project was originally developed by Australian companies Southern Pacific Petroleum NL and Central Pacific Minerals NL (SPP/CPM) and developed now by Queensland Energy Resources. The original facility built at the end of the 1990s was dismantled and the new demonstration facility started its operations in 2011.

== History ==
In 1997 SPP/CPM signed a joint venture agreement with the Canadian company Suncor Energy to develop the Stuart oil shale deposit. Suncor was designated as the project operator. In April 2001, Suncor left the project and SPP/CPM became the sole shareholder of the project. In February 2002, due to the restructuring of SPP/CPM, SPP became the holding company for the group's interests, including the Stuart Oil Shale Project. As SPP had granted fixed and floating charges in favour of Sandco Koala LLC in May 2003, the chargee appointed receivers of SPP on 2 December 2003. In February 2004, the Stuart Oil Shale Project was sold by receivers to the newly formed company Queensland Energy Resources, which announced on 21 July 2004 that the plant would be closed for economic and environmental reasons. Greenpeace, which had protested the project, viewed the closure as a major victory.

In April 2008, Queensland Energy Resources started to sell the equipment of the plant. On 14 August 2008, Queensland Energy Resources announced that it would replace the Alberta Taciuk Process (ATP) of oil shale processing with Paraho II technology and that it was dismantling the ATP-based plant. The facility was dismantled in 2008–2009, and a new demonstration plant based on the Paraho process was opened in September 2011.

== Project stages ==
The first stage of the project, which cost A$250–360 million, consisted of an oil-shale mine and an ATP technology based pilot retorting plant at Targinnie near Yarwun. The plant was constructed in 1997–1999 and was in operation from 1999 to 2004. It was the first application of the ATP technology in the world used for oil shale pyrolysis. The plant was designed to process 6,000 tonnes of oil shale per day with oil output of 4,500 barrels (720 m^{3}). From 2000 to 2004 the pilot plant produced over 1.5 million barrels (240×10^{3} m^{3}) of shale oil. After the closure the facility was dismantled.

The second stage with costs of A$600 million was planned to consist of a single commercial-size ATP module four times larger than the first with total capacity of 19,000 barrels (3,000 m^{3}) of oil products (naphtha and medium shale oil) daily. Originally it was planned to become operational in 2006. The third planned stage was construction of multiple commercial production units with capacity of up to 200,000 barrels of oil products per day. It was envisaged to come on stream during 2010–2013. The environmental impact assessment of stage 2 was suspended in December 2004.

The Paraho II technology based demonstration plant built in 2009–2011 at the new location consists of a vertical shaft kiln. Later the oil upgrading unit will be added. At the demonstration stage, the plant utilises 60 tonnes of oil shale per day producing 37–40 barrels per day (5.9–6.4 m^{3}/d). It uses lumps of shale instead of fine particles used by the ATP processor. The demonstration project is to cost over $100 million.

== Environmental issues ==
The first project was heavily criticized by environmentalists. Over 20,000 people and 27 environment, tourism and fishing groups opposed the shale oil plant. Greenpeace claimed that greenhouse emissions from the production of shale oil were nearly four times higher than from the production of conventional oil. In response, SPP promised to reduce greenhouse emissions from production of shale oil to 5% below those of conventional oil by stage 3. Greenpeace also claimed that the Stuart Oil Shale Project was a significant source of highly toxic dioxins and would damage the Great Barrier Reef World Heritage Area during stage 3. Public health concerns were also mentioned. Local residents claimed dioxins emitted from the plant affected their health and that the odour was unacceptable.

== See also ==
- Energy in Queensland
- Oil shale in Australia
