= Torbane =

Former village in New South Wales

Coordinates: 33°06′07.2″S 150°00′59″E

Torbane was a privately owned village lying within the area now known as Capertee, in the Local Government Area of the City of Lithgow, within the Central West region of New South Wales, Australia. There was also another village, Airly, nearby. Both villages were associated with the mining of oil shale. The mine associated with Torbane was known as the New Hartley Mine. and that associated with Airly was known as the Genowlan Mine. There were retorts that produced crude shale oil at Torbane. Both Torbane and Airly are now ghost towns.

== History ==
=== Aboriginal presence ===
The area lies within the traditional lands of Wiradjuri people. There are Aboriginal heritage sites in the area.

=== Mining, oil production, and mining villages ===
Torbane takes its name from Torbane Hill in Bathgate, Scotland, and shares a similar etymology with Torbanite, a type of oil shale that is found there. It was the mining of oil shale that first led to the establishment of the villages of Tobane and Airly. The area is dominated by two mountains, actually mesas, Mount Airly and Genowlan Mountain, that rise from the broad floor of the Capertee Valley. Between the two is the Airly Gap. The mining was mainly on the eastern side of Airly Mountain, the western side of Airly Gap. The village of Torbane was on the western side of Airly Mountain, whereas the village of Airly was to its east. Airly and Mount Airly are supposed to have been named after Airlie Castle in Scotland.

Prospectors found workable deposits of oil shale and took out leases on the eastern side of Mount Airly, but apparently lacked finance and the leases were cancelled.The first mining of oil shale began in 1883, when a German syndicate, The Genowlan Shale Company, took up the leases and began to send the highest grade shale to Germany, for enrichment of town gas. The village of Airly developed as a result. The shale was hauled in drays to the railway at Capertee. Later a horse-drawn tramway and a rope-haulage rail track, over the southern end of Mount Airly, toward the railway line, was used.

A second mine developed to the north, with a separate rope-haulage line over the northern end of Mount Airly to a site near where the village of Torbane developed. This second mine was originally known as 'King's Mine'; it became known as the 'New Hartley Mine' when it was purchased by the New South Wales Shale and Oil Company, operator of the shale oil mines at Hartley Vale, in 1896. Forty vertical retorts and other structures were erected in 1900. Crude oil produced in the retorts was sold to the Australian Gas Light Co, for gas enrichment, but was also railed to the company's existing shale oil refinery at Hartley Vale, for further processing by fractional distillation. The retorts required coal as fuel, and this was obtained from the Wongawilli coal seam, which also outcropped at Mount Airly. Later, a tunnel, cut into the coal seam and passing right through the mountain, was used to accommodate the rope-haulage tramway, replacing the steep route over the mountain.

In the meantime, by 1903, the Glenowlan mine had been leased to the Australian Shale Syndicate and was being mined by the Australian Kerosene Oil and Mineral Company, operator of the old Joadja works, for the payment a royalty fee on each ton mined. The two mines—New Hartley and Genowlan—were mining the same seam of oil shale, and a dispute arose, which was won by New South Wales Shale and Oil Company. By mid 1904, A.K.O. & M. operations at the Genowlan mine had ceased. Shareholders of Australian Kerosene Oil and Mineral Co. voted to voluntarily wind up that company in 1906. The leases held by the Australian Shale Syndicate were sold to the British Australian Oil Company in 1910, and that company operated a mine at Airly, for some years thereafter, to supply the Torbane retorts.

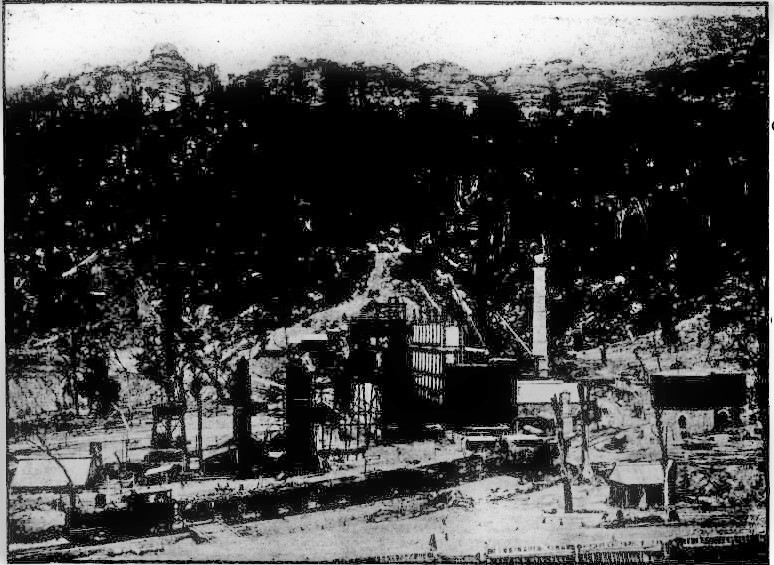
Newly-completed Pumpherson retorts, with a train of oil tanker wagons in the foreground, Torbane, 1908.

In April 1906, the assets of the New South Wales Shale and Oil Company were bought by the Commonwealth Oil Corporation. In 1908, it erected 32 new vertical retorts at Torbane, built to a Scottish design, the Pumpherson retort, while continuing to operate the 40 existing retorts.

There was a siding and railway station, on the Gwarbegar line, named Torbane, from which crude oil for refining and oil shale were dispatched. The siding opened in 1897, followed by the station (a platform and waiting shed), in 1900, which was enlarged in 1912. It closed in 1974. The station was located a little to the south of where the turn out for the rail loading loop of the Airly Mine is now. From the siding, a steam-hauled standard-gauge private railway ran about three kilometres to the retorts site at Torbane. Two locomotives were used on the branch line, ex-NSWGR 69x and 360x.

There was a post office at Torbane, known as Torbane Mines, between 1902 and 1920. and a school, known as Torbane, between 1899 and 1920. At the neighbouring village of Airly, from 1897, there was a school, known as Genowlan, until 1910, and then known as Airly, until it closed in 1920. Airly had a post office of that name, from 1897 to 1920.

From January 1903, Airly had a church hall constructed of stone; it was intended to be reusable as the basement of a larger church building in the event that it would be needed in future. Whether or not the church hall was operated as a Union Church, it may have been used by at least three denominations. Services at Airly were conducted by a Catholic priest based at Sofala, an Anglican minister based at Running Stream, and probably by a Methodist minister based in Ryalstone.

In May 1896, a cave on Glenowlan Mountain was where a Spanish man, who spoke no English, John Terossa, better known as the notorious outlaw 'Slippery Jack', was captured by police. He had lived in the bush, for around two years, and survived by burgling and stealing food from farms. He was sentenced to five years for burglary.

Both Mount Airly and Genowlan Mountain are capped in basalt in places, and under these caps are deep lead deposits that contained gold and diamonds, which have been mined on a small scale.

=== Decline and closure ===
In 1913, by then operated by Commonwealth Oil Corporation Ltd, the oil shale works at Torbane was closed down, probably due to the difficulties the company found itself facing at their newer and far larger site at Newnes. The closure reduced Torbane's population to around 35, mostly families of men seeking work elsewhere. Some mining continued at Airley, taking shale for use by the railways in gas-making.

The Torbane retorts were reopened in 1916, before finally closing in 1918, during the time that COC was under the management of John Fell. Mining had ceased in June 1918. It is likely that this later period of operation was facilitated by government subsidies paid for local oil production in wartime. In 1920, most of the buildings in the Torbane township were pulled down and relocated to Newnes.

Another company, Torquay and Anglesea Oil Co. erected retorts and other structures there in 1925-1926, but the proposed operation seems not to have started production. Around the same time, Commonwealth Oil Corporation removed firebricks from its old retorts, for use at the new oil refinery, at Clyde in Sydney, that was being built by John Fell. The dismantling work, including lifting of the private railway line was completed by 1930, the same year in which the Commonwealth Oil Company was deregistered.

During the Second World War, Genders, the owners of the Great Cobar Colliery at Lithgow, erected new shale retorts at Torbane to produce petrol for their own vehicle fleet.

== Remnants ==
The area, where the mines, retorts and villages were, is east of the Castlereagh Highway and north of Glen Davis Road. Part of the area is part of the Mugii Murum-ban State Conservation Area. Little remains of the village of Torbane, which now lies on private land. The old manager's house at Torbane survives as a private residence. There are ruins of retorts, industrial buildings and storage tanks at the old retorts site at Torbane, which also lie on private land.

There are ruins at Airly, including of some miners' huts that made use of natural cavities in the rock face and the village's German-style bakery. Part of the site and the area extending west to the railway line is occupied by the Airly Mine, where thermal coal is mined by Centennial Coal. The road running from Glen Davis Road across the Airly Mine's land is still known as Torbane Road.

== See also ==
- List of shale oil operations in Australia
