= Blue Ensign Technologies =

Australian oil shale company

Blue Ensign Technologies Limited (ASX: BLE) is an Australian oil shale company developing the Julia Creek oil shale project through its subsidiary Queensland Shale Oil Limited. It is an owner of the intellectual property of the Rendall Process, a patented hydrogen donor solvent process of shale oil extraction. JSG-A LP (John Rendall's family) owns 42.6% of shares and Colonial First State owns 24.3%.

== Julia Creek Project ==
Queensland Shale Oil Limited holds a tenement of 93 square kilometres (36 sq mi) near Julia Creek in Queensland. At the first stage, a pilot shale oil plant with processing capacity one tonne of oil shale per hour will be built at Townsville. At the second stage, an oil shale mine and commercial scale shale oil plant with processing capacity of 600 tonnes per hour to be developed at Julia Creek. At the third stage, a full scale commercial shale oil plant with capacity of 2,000 tonnes per hour will be developed.

== Rendall Process ==
In the Rendall Process, oil shale is mixed with a petroleum-based liquid fuel. The mixture is heated to 450 °C (840 °F) with pressure of ~600 PSI in a closed chamber before it's fed into a second unit for hydrogenation of kerogen in a hydrogen donor solvent. Shale gas vapors are captured to produce hydrogen for the processing unit and to generate heat and power.
