= Queensland Energy Resources =

Australian energy company

- Type: Private
- Industry: Energy
- Founded: 2004
- Headquarters: Brisbane, Australia
- Key people: Warren Wyld (General Manager)
- Products: Shale oil
- Website: https://qer.com.au/

Queensland Energy Resources Limited (QER Ltd) is an Australian oil shale mining and shale oil extraction company with the headquarters in Brisbane. It is the developer of the Stuart (Yarwun) and McFarlane oil shale projects.

== History ==
Queensland Energy Resources Limited was formed in February 2004, when it acquired the assets of the Stuart Oil Shale Project from receivers of the project's former developer, Southern Pacific Petroleum N.L. On 21 July 2004, QER announced that the plant would be shut down for economic and environmental reasons. From 2005 to 2007, oil shale from its deposits were tested in a pilot plant facility in Rifle, Colorado owned by Shale Technologies. On 14 August 2008, Queensland Energy Resources announced that it had shunned the Alberta Taciuk Processor (ATP) oil shale processing technology in favor of the Paraho II technology and that the ATP technology-based plant was being dismantled, and obsolete components were being sold. On 24 August 2008, the Queensland Government announced an oil-shale mining moratorium over one of the company-owned McFarlane deposit for 20 years.

On 10 May 2010, the company announced a plan for construction of a small-scale shale-oil demonstration plant at Yarwun (the site of the Stuart Oil Shale Project). The new plant produced its first oil on 6 October 2011, and began producing high quality ultra-low sulphur diesel and aviation fuel in September 2012. In February 2013, following a four-year industry review including a full environmental audit of QER's operations, the Queensland Government announced that it would allow the development of a commercial oil shale industry in Queensland under strict environmental conditions. The Government's oil shale policy sets vigorous environmental controls on the industry and allows existing oil shale operator, QER Ltd, to progress the demonstration plant at Gladstone to commercial stage. QER has now successfully completed the demonstration plant program, and is seeking investment in the next stage of its industry development, a commercial facility producing around 8,000 barrels per day of finished fuels.

== Operations ==
Queensland Energy Resources holds mining tenement rights to several oil shale deposits in Queensland, Australia. Two major resources are Stuart, located at Yarwun, Queensland, and McFarlane, located near Proserpine. The McFarlane oil shale resource, one of Australia's largest, remains under a 20-year mining moratorium. QER operates a visitor center at the Yarwun site and has completed a successful technology demonstration plant project based on the Paraho II Technology.

== See also ==
- Energy in Queensland
- Oil shale in Australia
