= Commonwealth Oil Refineries =

Former oil company of Australia

- Company type: Subsidiary
- Industry: Petroleum
- Founded: 1920
- Defunct: 1957
- Successor: BP Australia
- Area served: Australia
- Products: Refined petroleum fuels and related products
- Net income: £93,429 (1940)
- Total assets: £2,195,227 (1940)
- Parent: BP

Commonwealth Oil Refineries (COR) was an Australian oil company that operated between 1920 and 1952 as a joint venture between the Government of Australia and Anglo-Persian Oil Company.

== Early history ==
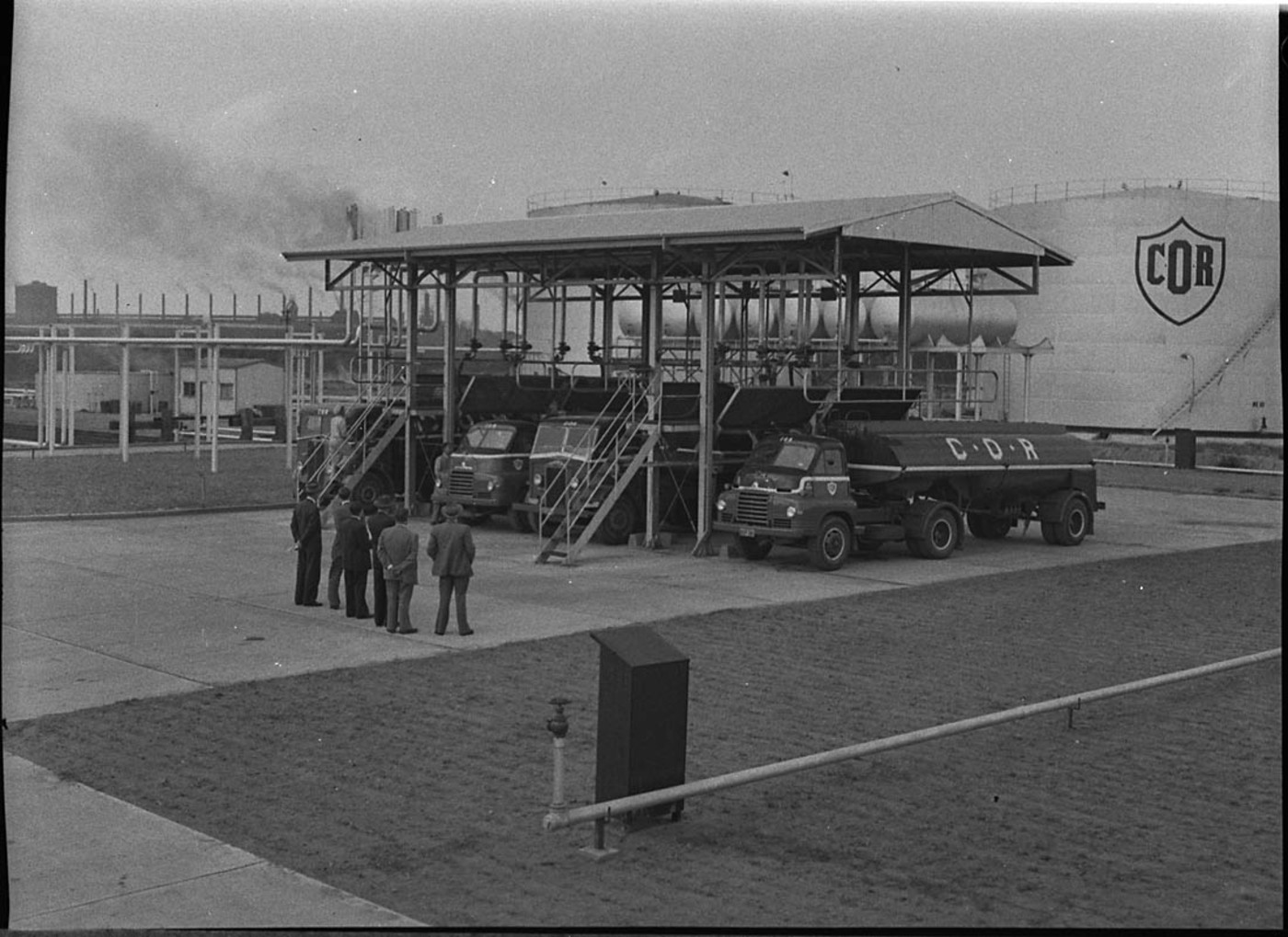
The Commonwealth Oil Refineries terminal in Carrington, New South Wales

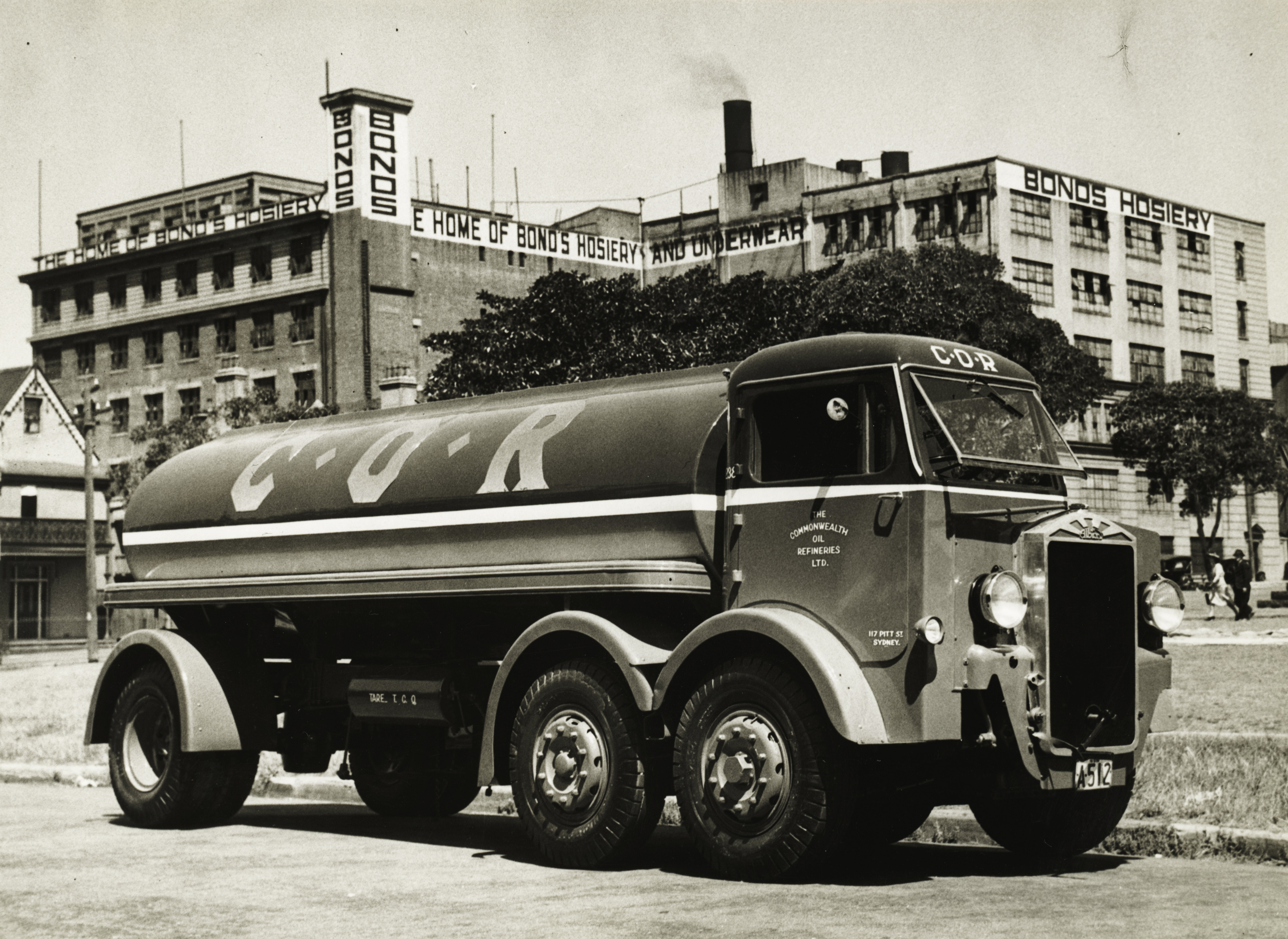
Commonwealth Oil Refineries Albion tanker in front of Bonds factory, Camperdown, Sydney, c. 1935

The partnership was established in 1920 on the initiative of Australian prime minister Billy Hughes.

The board was to consist of seven members, three representing the Government of Australia and four representing the Anglo-Persian Oil Company. The provisional board consisted of: Sir Robert Garran, M. C. Lockyer, and Robert Gibson for the Commonwealth, and F. H. Bathurst, Professor Payne, Thomas John Greenway, and W. J. Windeyer for the oil company. Greenway served as chairman for the first year.

In 1922, COR purchased the disused shale oil refinery at Hamilton, New South Wales, that had been operated by British Australian Oil Company, and relocated equipment from there for use in its new refinery in Victoria.

In 1924, the company opened Australia's first refinery to process imported crude oil, near Laverton, Victoria, north of the Melbourne - Geelong railway line, adjacent to Kororoit Creek Road. The refinery received its first shipment of crude oil on 12 March 1924, with product coming "on-stream" on 17 May 1924. The refinery had an annual processing capacity of 100,000 tons of crude oil. The refinery was shut down on 6 August 1955, having been eclipsed by much larger refineries built around the country.

In the 1930s, the company was involved in oil search ventures.

== BP ==
In 1952, the Menzies government sold the Australian government interest in COR to the Anglo-Iranian Oil Company, which became the BP in 1954. The last speech in parliament by former prime minister, Billy Hughes, was an attack on the Menzies government's decision to sell its share in COR, the state-owned enterprise Hughes's government had established over 30 years earlier. According to Herbert Evatt, his speech "seemed at once to grip the attention of all honourable members present ... nobody left the House, and nobody seemed to dare to move".

In 1955, BP developed the Kwinana Oil Refinery in Western Australia

== BP/COR ==
Between 1952 and 1959, BP Australia branded its standard-grade petrol as COR, but then dropped the name.
