= Xtract Resources =

British metals and minerals producer

Xtract Resources plc
- Type: Public
- Traded as: AIM: XTR
- Industry: Mining
- Predecessor: Resmex plc Xtract Energy plc
- Founded: 2004
- Headquarters: London, United Kingdom
- Area served: Chile; South Africa; Mozambique
- Key people: Colin Bird, CEO; Fiona J Henderson, Board member and Shareholder
- Revenue: $24.7 million
- Website: xtractresources.com

Xtract Resources plc (former names: Resmex plc and Xtract Energy plc) is a diversified metals and minerals producer based in London, United Kingdom. The company's shares are traded on London Stock Exchange Alternative Investment Market. Its CEO is Colin Bird. The primary focus of the company is gold and copper exploration and mining. The company's main assets are located in Chile, Mozambique, and South Africa.

== History ==
The company was established in October 2004 as Resmex plc. In March 2005, its shares were listed on London Stock Exchange Alternative Investment Market.

In August 2005, Resmex acquired Sermines de Mexico S.A. de C.V., which owned mineral exploration and development rights in three concessions in the California–Sonora Gold Belt in Mexico. In 2006, it acquired Xtract Oil Limited, an Australian oil shale company developing the Julia Creek oil shale deposit, from Intermin Resources Limited. To finance this deal, it issued new shares to Cambrian Mining, which became the major shareholder of Resmex. Correspondingly, the company changed its name to Xtract Energy, starting from 2 May 2006.

In October 2006, Xtract Energy purchased 19.5% of Wasabi Energy Ltd, 18.6% of Aviva Corporation (not affiliated with Aviva Energy Corp.) and 28.2% of Cambrian Oil & Gas from Cambrian Mining. Later, Cambrian Oil & Gas merged to Xtract through which Xtract got shareholdings in MEO Australia Ltd and Elko Energy, and ownership of Zhibek Resources, a company involved in oil and gas activities in Kyrgyzstan. In August 2007, Xtract sold its interests in Aviva Corporation to Wasabi Energy in exchange for new shares and warrants in Wasabi. The shareholding in Wasabi was sold in 2009. At the same year, the shareholding in MEO Australia was sold.

In 2008, Xtract together with Merty Energy, Petroleum Exploration, Education and Services Inc established a joint venture Extrem Energy A.S. for oil exploration and production activities in Turkey.

In May 2012, Xtract transferred its holdings in Zhibek Resources to Caspian Oil & Gas (now: Equus Mining Limited) in exchange of a minority shareholding in that company, and exit from Kyrgyzstan.

In December 2012, Xtract Energy disposed its oil shale interests by transferring 100% stake in Xtract Oil Limitedand 70% stake in Xtract Energy (Oil Shale) Morocco S.A. to Global Oil Shale Group Limited in exchange of the strategic stake in that company.

On 25 June 2013, the company changed its name to Xtract Resources. It was refocused into a mining industry.

In 2014, Xtract bought the Chepica gold and copper mine in Chile. The deal included also the acquisition of the Mejillones phosphate deposit; however, that deposit was resold to Mines Global later at the same year. In 2015, Xtract bought the Manica gold mining project in Mozambique.

== Operations ==
=== Gold mining ===
In Chile, Xtract develops the Chépica gold and copper mine. As of November 2015, gold reefs have been discovered at Salvadori and Colin prospects, while the development of the Chepica prospect had reached a depth of 90 metres (300 ft). The full ownership of the project would transferred to Xtract by December 2016. Together with Mineral Technologies International, Xtract develops the Fair Bride open pit project, a part of the Manica gold licence in Mozambiue.

=== Copper mining ===
In South Africa, Xtract has exclusive rights to acquire the O'Kiep and Carolusberg copper sulphide dump projects. Located within 30 kilometres (19 mi) of Springbok, Northern Cape, with 33.8 million tonnes of sulphide copper tailings material on surface, the priority is to carry out drilling, sampling and metallurgical work in order to commission a feasibility report. According to the agreement with a copper producer Shirley Hayes IPK Pty Ltd, Xtract has rights to evaluate the Concordia project copper dumps in Southn Africa, including of 182,000 tonnes of copper oxide material on surface.

== Past activities ==
=== Conventional oil and gas ===
Elko Energy Inc, a wholly owned by Xtract Energy, is a Canadian registered oil and gas exploration company which had exploration and production activities in North Sea. The company owned a 33% stake in license for the North Sea blocks 1/11 and 02/05 (Luna probe), other partners being Noreco and the Danish North Sea Fund. The license was relinquished the attempt to find petroleum was unsuccessful. In the Dutch sector of the North Sea, the company had rights for 5% of royalties from the Chevron-operated block P2-10.

Through Zhibek Resources, Xtract was involved in oil and gas activities in Kyrgyzstan, including an exploration of the Tash Kumyr licence area and development of the Beshkent–Togap oil field. Through the shareholding in MEO Australia Ltd, Xtract was involved in Tassie Shoal Methanol Project and Timor Sea LNG and GTL projects. Through Extrem Energy, it was engaged in the development of the offshore fields at the Gulf of Çandarlı and the Sea of Marmara, and onshore fields of Edirne, Siraseki, and Alasehir/Sarakiz in Turkey.

=== Oil shale ===
Through Xtract Oil, the company developed the 709-square-kilometre (274 sq mi) Julia Creek oil shale concession area in Queensland, and oil shale deposits in New Zealand. In 2013, Xtract Oil was transferred to the Global Oil Shale Group. To extract oil from the Julia Creek oil shale resource, the Galoter process was proposed. At the same time, Xtract Technologies, a subsidiary of Xtract Oil, developed a supercritical solvent shale oil extraction technology which is a type of the donor solvent technology. In this process, oil shale would be processed in enclosed vessels in the presence of hydrogen solvents. The company claimed that the process would be carried out at moderate temperatures that do not liberate carbon dioxide. Through a 70% stake in Xtract Energy (Oil Shale) Morocco SA, a joint venture with Alraed of Saudi Arabia, Xtract Energy evaluated an oil shale deposit near Tarfaya, Morocco.

=== Other activities ===
Xtract Energy had 19.4% in Wasabi Energy, which through its subsidiaries was involved in uranium, geothermal and coal activities.
