= Newnes, New South Wales =

Newnes
- Town
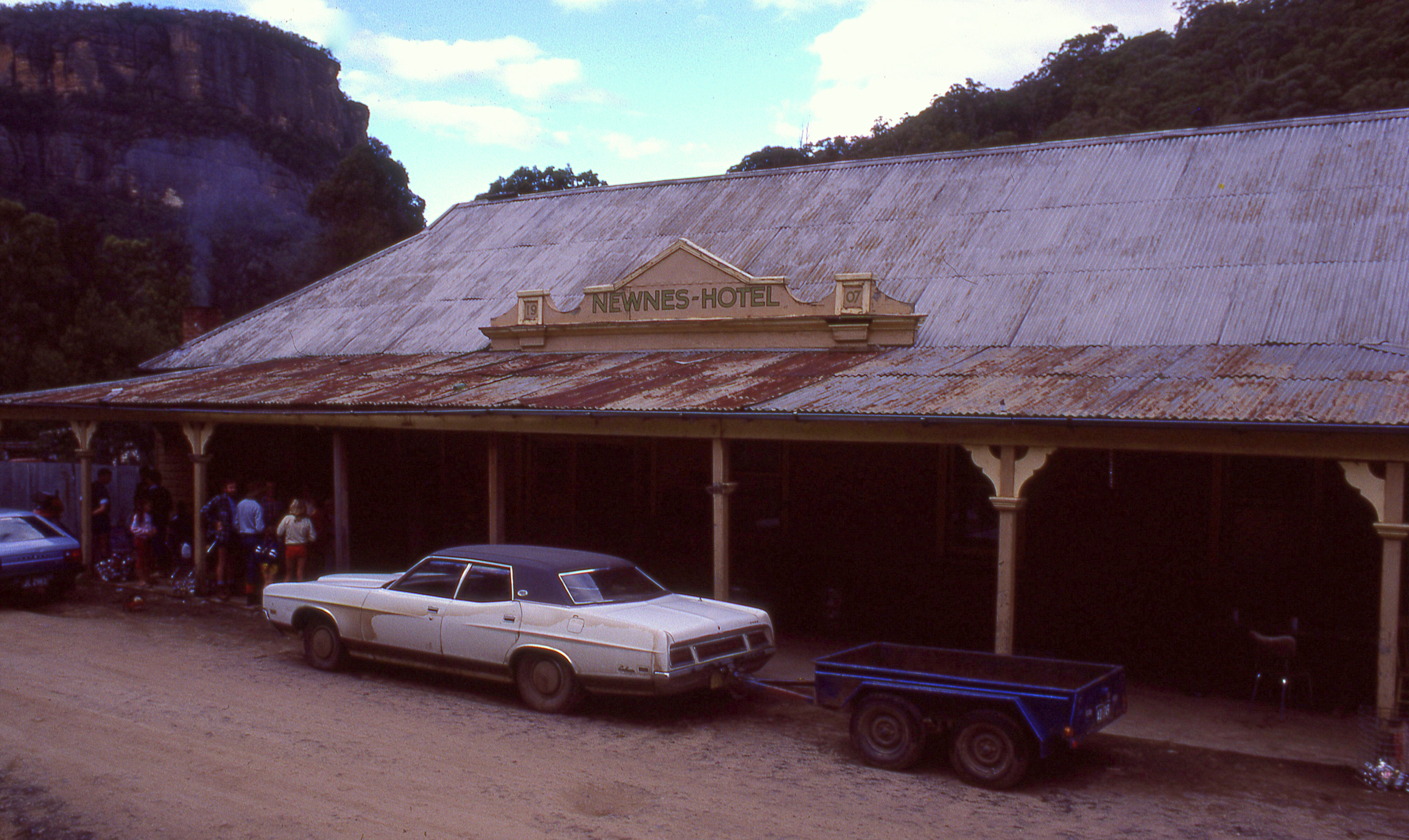
- Newnes Hotel in the 1980s

- Coordinates: 33°10′45″S 150°14′09″E
- Country: Australia
- State: New South Wales
- LGA: City of Lithgow
- Location: 49 km (30 mi) N of Lithgow; 186 km (116 mi) WNW of Sydney

Government
  - State electorate: Bathurst
  - Federal division: Calare
- Elevation: 516 m (1,693 ft)

Population
  - Total: 4 (2016 census)
- Postcode: 2790

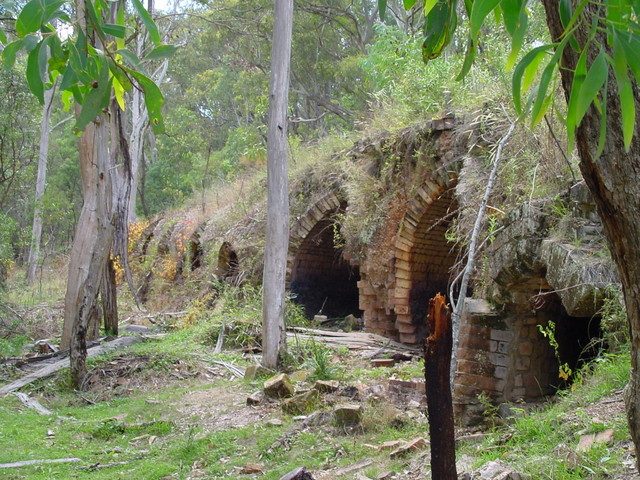
The ruined coke ovens at Newnes

Newnes (/nuːnz/), an abandoned oil shale mining site of the Wolgan Valley, is located in the Central Tablelands region of New South Wales, Australia. The site that was operational in the early 20th century is now partly surrounded by Wollemi National Park. The settlement was originally built by the Commonwealth Oil Corporation.

== History and description ==
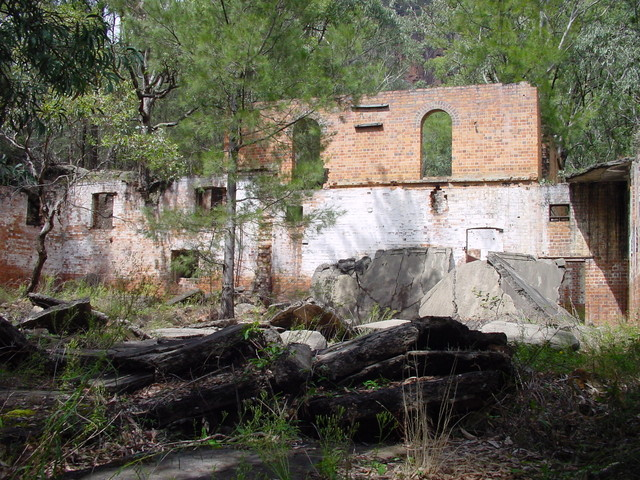
More ruins at the original Newnes Industrial Section

A major oil shale mine with two headings was started on the north side of the Wolgan River, opposite the works. It was intended to tunnel through the mountain to meet up with some earlier workings in the Capertee Valley as mining conditions in the Capertee were regarded as being much better than in the Wolgan. However, mining difficulties and the generally low quality of the shale in this area meant that mining became concentrated on the No. 2 mine and work on the No. 1 mine was eventually abandoned. Although construction of a tunnel linking the Wolgan Valley with the Capertee was proposed on numerous subsequent occasions, it was to remain an elusive dream.

The No. 2 mine was established on the southern side of the river, east of the works. This mine was to provide most of the oil shale for the working life of Newnes.

The main works site was established in a sweeping bend on the south bank of the Wolgan River and extending up the adjacent talus hillside. These works consisted of retorts, various distillation areas, oil storage tanks and washers, plant for the refining of the various finished products, a power station, workshops, etc., with provision for future expansion. They were built in a substantial manner, as attested by the extensive ruins that stand to this day. Although construction commenced in 1906, it was not until 1911 that the initial stage was completed and the retorts charged for the first time.

A village was established close to the mining leases. Originally known as Wolgan, it was renamed Newnes—after Sir George Newnes, the chairman of the Commonwealth Oil Corporation at the time—in early 1907. In its early years, Newnes was also known as South Newnes to distinguish it from the small settlement of North Newnes, in the Capertee Valley, from where a tunnel was being driven toward the Wolgan Valley operations until September 1906.

Over the years its prosperity reflected that of the mining operations so that in 1906 Newnes had a population of about 100, increasing to 800 by 1907, fell to 96 in 1914, grew to 200 by 1924 but then fell again to only 4 families in 1940. At the 2016 census, Newnes had a population of 4.

The company built the 50 kilometres (31 mi) Newnes railway line from the Main Western railway line south of Newnes to their works through very difficult country, particularly where the line descended into the Wolgan Valley from the plateau above. This railway is no longer in use and the rails have been removed. A tunnel on the railway has survived as the Glowworm Tunnel, which has become something of a tourist attraction.

The Newnes Hotel functioned successfully for some time, although business was affected when mining operations were shifted to Glen Davis, further north in the Capertee Valley. However, the hotel was flood-prone because of its proximity to the Wolgan River. In 1986, flooding undermined the building's structure, as a result of which it was physically moved by volunteers in 1987. The licence was sold in 1988.

== Camping ==
Camping is available on both sides of the Wolgan River; only pit toilets are provided. Most of the camping is in the National Park, at no charge, so pets are not permitted. Wood should not be collected for wood fires.

There is a very small amount of private land remaining in Newnes, where camping is available for a fee and pets are permitted. Information available from the former Newnes Hotel, which is open as a kiosk on most weekends.

== Walks and hikes ==
There are several walks in the Newnes area, apart from walking through the ruins. Walks include:

- Pipeline Pass - This is a medium to hard walk that goes from Newnes to the oil shale operations at Glen Davis. The walk takes around 10 hours and is normally completed as an overnight walk. There are lyrebirds, cycads, Banksia and assorted Eucalyptus trees. As of 2015 the pass is now closed due to private property disputes near Newnes.
- Wolgan River to Rocky Creek. This route follows the Wolgan River downstream to Rocky Creek. The route is hard to find in many places, but the walking grade is fairly moderate and most people can complete it in a full day return.
- Wolgan River to Annie Rowan Creek. Two day (overnight at Annie Rowan Creek) or three-day (two nights at junction of Rocky Creek and Deanes Creek) return. Note that the track beyond Rocky Creek is mostly on the north side of the Wolgan River.

== Wildlife ==
A variety of native wildlife can be observed in the vicinity of the Newnes campground. Examples are:

- goannas
- wallabies, especially near dusk
- wombats

== See also ==
- Henry Deane - engineer for Newnes railway.
- Joadja
- Glen Davis, New South Wales
- Glen Davis Shale Oil Works
- Torbane
- List of Australian heritage railways
- List of shale oil operations in Australia
- Commonwealth Oil Corporation
- John Fell (industrialist)
