= Pumpherston retort =

Type of oil-shale retort

- Process type: chemical
- Industrial sector(s): oil shale industry
- Feedstock: oil shale
- Product(s): shale oil, oil shale gas, ammonia
- Leading companies: Pumpherston Oil Company
- Inventor: William Fraser, James Bryson, James Jones
- Year of invention: 1894

The Pumpherston retort (also known as the Bryson retort) was a type of oil-shale retort used in Britain at the end of 19th and beginning of 20th century. It marked separation of the oil-shale industry from the coal industry as it was designed specifically for oil-shale retorting. The retort is named after Pumpherston, West Lothian, which was one of the major oil shale areas in Great Britain. The retort was commercialized by Pumpherston Oil Company.

== History ==
The Pumpherston retort was invented and patented in 1894 by William Fraser, James Bryson, and James Jones of Pumpherston Oil Company. By 1910, 1,528 Pumpherston retorts were used in Scotland. In addition, the retort was used in Spain and Australia.

The Pumpherson design was used at Newnes and Torbane, in Australia, by Commonwealth Oil Corporation. The retorts at Newnes were later modified, by adding more off-takes, to make it better suited to oil-rich shale, by John Fell. The resulting design variant was patented by Fell, and was referred to as a 'modified Pumpherson' or 'Fell' retort. That modified design was also used at Glen Davis.

== Design ==
The Pumpherston retort was a 35 feet (11 m) high cylindrical vessel containing two main sections. The upper section was made of iron and the lower section was made of fire bricks. The raw oil shale was fed on the top of retort. Shale oil and oil shale gas were distilled at the upper section at the temperature of 750 to 900 °F (399 to 482 °C). At the lower section, the heat rose to 1,300 °F (704 °C) and steam was added to produce ammonia. The process required approximately 1,000 imperial barrels (160,000 L; 36,000 imp gal; 43,000 US gal) of water equivalent of steam per one ton of oil shale.

The retort had a 15 ton capacity, and the residence time was 24 hours. It was started up by combustion of coal, but after the process started it was switched to the produced oil shale gas.
