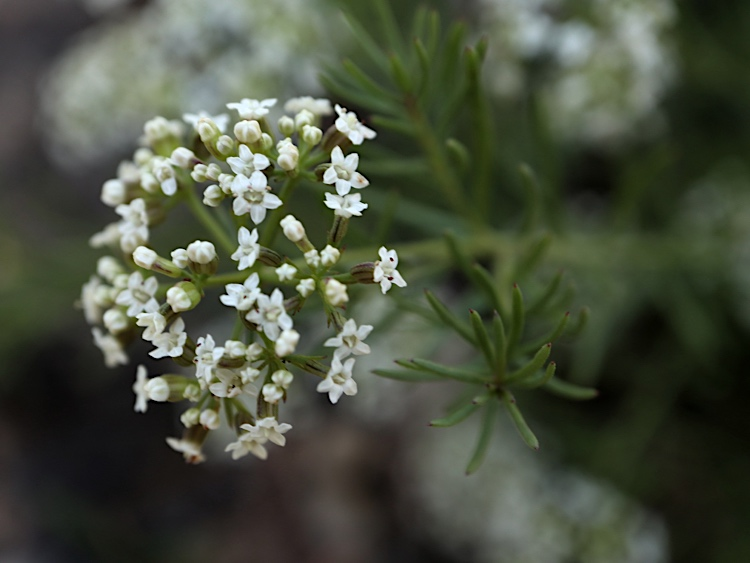
- In Capertee National Park

Scientific classification
- Kingdom: Plantae
- Clade: Tracheophytes
- Clade: Angiosperms
- Clade: Eudicots
- Clade: Asterids
- Order: Apiales
- Family: Apiaceae
- Genus: Platysace
- Species: P. ericoides

Binomial name
- Platysace ericoides (Sieber ex Spreng.) C.Norman

Synonyms
- Didiscus tenuis (DC.) M.Hiroe; Platysace ericoides var. 'A'; Sibera ericoides Moore orth. var.; Siebera ericoides Benth.; Siebera ericoides Benth. var. ericoides; Trachymene ericoides Sieber ex Spreng.; Trachymene ericoides Sieber ex DC. nom. illeg.; Trachymene ericoides Sieber ex Spreng. var. ericoides; Trachymene ericoides var. typica Domin nom. inval.; Trachymene subvelutina DC.; Trachymene tenuis DC.

= Platysace ericoides =

Species of shrub

Platysace ericoides, commonly known as heath platysace, is a species of flowering plant in the family Apiaceae and is endemic to eastern Australia. It is a semi-prostrate to weakly erect, open shrub or subshrub with linear or elliptic to oblong leaves with white or cream-coloured flowers in compound umbels with 3 to 10 rays.

== Description ==
Platysace ericoides is a semi-prostrate to weakly erect, open shrub that typically grows to a height of 10–50 cm (3.9–19.7 in) and has scaly or hairy branches. Its leaves are linear to elliptic or oblong, mostly 2.8–20 mm (0.11–0.79 in) long and 0.5–1.8 mm (0.020–0.071 in) wide on a petiole up to 0.5 mm (0.020 in) long. The flowers are borne in umbels 5–22 mm (0.20–0.87 in) wide with about 3 to 10 rays on peduncles mostly 5–15 mm (0.20–0.59 in) long with narrowly elliptic bracts up to 2.5 mm (0.098 in) wide. Each ray usually has 2 to 8 white or cream-coloured flowers. Flowering occurs from August to December and the fruit is about 2 mm (0.079 in) long and wide.

== Taxonomy ==
This species was first formally described in 1827 by Kurt Polycarp Joachim Sprengel who gave it the name Trachymene ericoides from an unpublished description by Franz Sieber. Sprengel's description was published in Systema Vegetabilium. In 1939, Cecil Norman transferred the species to Platysace as P. ericoides in the Journal of Botany, British and Foreign. The specific epithet (ericoides) means "'Erica-like".

== Distribution and habitat ==
Platysace ericoides grows in heath and woodland on sandy soil from Mittagong in New South Wales to south-east Queensland and between Moe and Orbost in Victoria.
