= P. commutata =

P. commutata may refer to:

- Pachycondyla commutata, a ponerine ant
- Palustriella commutata, a leafy moss
- Phalaris commutata, a true grass
- Platysace commutata, a plant endemic to Australia
- Preissia commutata, a thallose liverwort
- Pteris commutata, a fern in which the frond margin is reflexed over the marginal sori
- Pterostylis commutata, a deciduous orchid
- Puccinia commutata, a plant pathogen
