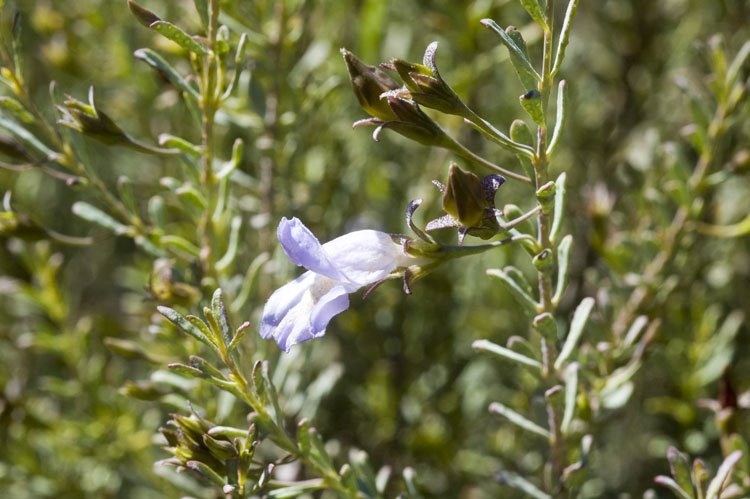

Scientific classification
- Kingdom: Plantae
- Clade: Embryophytes
- Clade: Tracheophytes
- Clade: Spermatophytes
- Clade: Angiosperms
- Clade: Eudicots
- Clade: Asterids
- Order: Lamiales
- Family: Scrophulariaceae
- Genus: Eremophila
- Species: E. pustulata

Binomial name
- Eremophila pustulata S.Moore

= Eremophila pustulata =

Blistered eremophila

Species of flowering plant

Eremophila pustulata, commonly known as blistered eremophila is a flowering plant in the figwort family, Scrophulariaceae and is endemic to Western Australia. It is an erect shrub with fleshy, warty leaves and purple, lilac, violet or white flowers.

== Description ==
Eremophila pustulata is an erect shrub which grows to a height of 0.5 to 1.5 m (2 to 5 ft). Its branches are yellowish-green to purplish when young, turning reddish-brown as they age and turn woody. The branches are covered with small, raised warty lumps and are glabrous. The leaves are arranged in opposite pairs along the branches and are fleshy, with the lower surface convex in shape. The leaves are mostly 5.5–9 mm (0.2–0.4 in) long, 1–3 mm (0.04–0.1 in) wide, glabrous, with raised glands and are egg-shaped to lance-shaped with the narrower end towards the base.

The flowers are borne singly in leaf axils on hairy stalks 2–3 mm (0.08–0.1 in) long. There are 5 overlapping, green, hairy sepals which are egg-shaped and mostly 2–3 mm (0.08–0.1 in) long. The petals are 9.5–13 mm (0.4–0.5 in) long and are joined at their lower end to form a tube. The petal tube is lilac-coloured, purple, blue or sometimes white, and faintly spotted purple inside the tube. The 4 stamens are fully enclosed in the petal tube. Flowering occurs from April to December and is followed by the fruits which are oval-shaped to almost spherical, glabrous, reddish-brown to blackish-brown drupes.

== Taxonomy and naming ==
This species was first formally described by Spencer Le Marchant Moore in 1905 and the description was published in Journal of Botany, British and Foreign. The specific epithet (pustulata) is derived from the Latin word pustula meaning "pimple", "bubble" or "blister", referring to the prominent wart-like lumps on the branches and lower surface of the leaves.

== Distribution and habitat ==
Blistered eremophila is common in areas around Kalgoorlie in the Coolgardie and Murchison biogeographic regions where it grows in sandy-loam or clay in greenstone hills and plains.

== Conservation ==
Eremophila pustulata is classified as "not threatened" by the Western Australian Government Department of Parks and Wildlife.

== Use in horticulture ==
A very hardy and attractive shrub, some specimens of this eremophila have been in cultivation for more than 25 years. It can be propagated from seed or from cuttings and grows well in a range of soils, including clay, in full sun or part shade and is both drought and frost tolerant.
