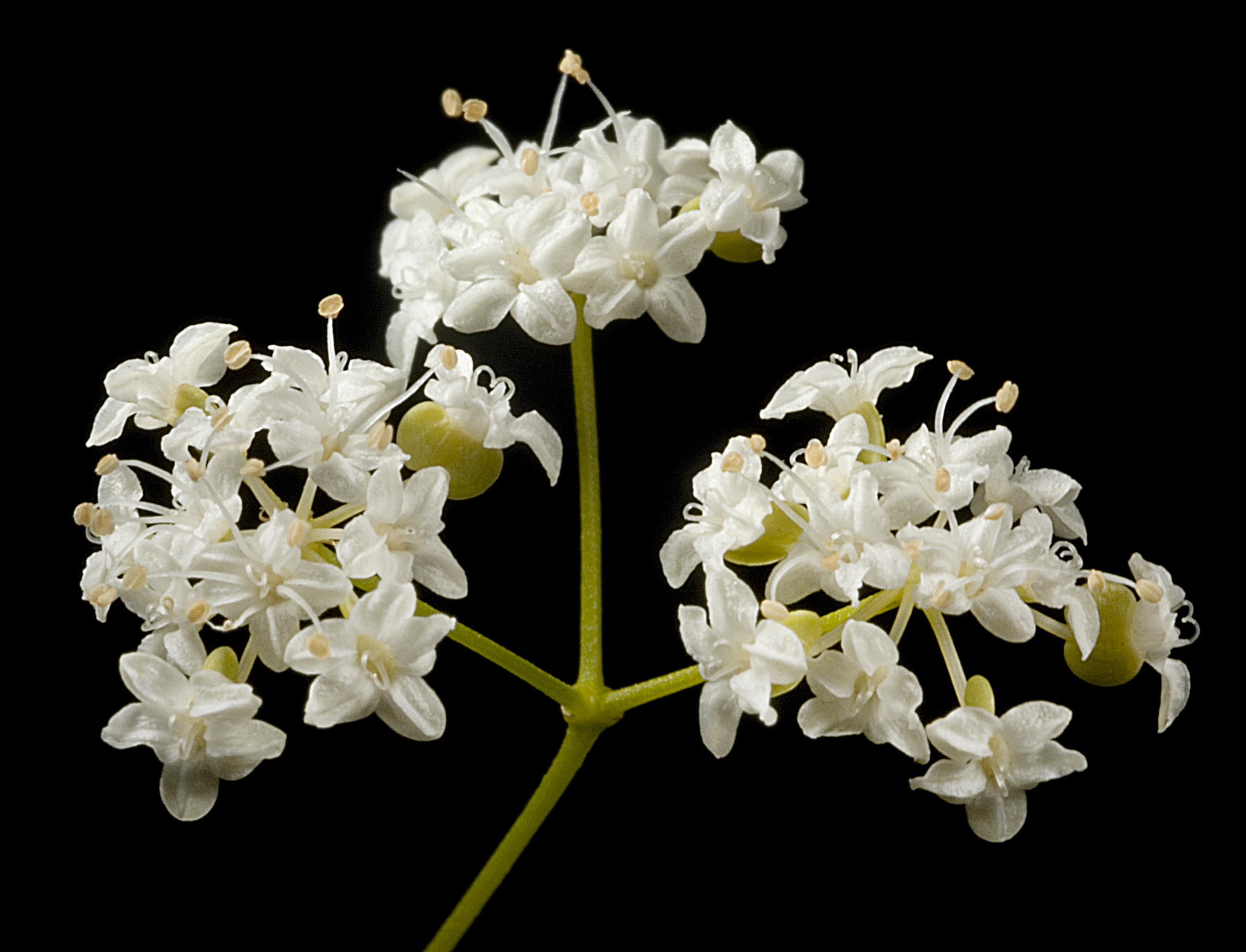

Scientific classification
- Kingdom: Plantae
- Clade: Tracheophytes
- Clade: Angiosperms
- Clade: Eudicots
- Clade: Asterids
- Order: Apiales
- Family: Apiaceae
- Genus: Platysace
- Species: P. effusa

Binomial name
- Platysace effusa (Turcz.) C.Norman

Synonyms
- Siebera effusa (Turcz.) Benth.; Trachymene effusa Turcz.

= Platysace effusa =

Species of shrub

Platysace effusa is a species of flowering plant in the family Apiaceae and is endemic to the south-west of Western Australia. It is a tuberous, perennial herb or shrub with linear leaves and white flowers in a compound umbel.

== Description ==
Platysace effusa is a tuberous, perennial herb or shrub that typically grows to a height of 10–75 cm (3.9–29.5 in) and has wand-like branches. Its leaves are linear to wedge-shaped, usually 4–8.7 mm (0.16–0.34 in) long and often crowded. White flowers are borne in compound umbels with 4 to 8 rays on thin peduncles longer than the leaves, each ray with a partial umbel. Flowering occurs in most months and the fruit is flat and about 2 mm (0.079 in) long and notched at the base.

== Taxonomy ==
This species was first formally described in 1849 by Nikolai Turczaninow who gave it the name Trachymene effusa in the journal Bulletin de la Société Impériale des Naturalistes de Moscou from specimens collected by James Drummond. In 1939, Cecil Norman transferred the species to Platysace as P. effusa in the Journal of Botany, British and Foreign. The specific epithet (effusa) means "spread out" or "straggling" referring to the habit of the plant.

== Distribution and habitat ==
This species of platysace grows on sandplains, sand dunes and hills in the Avon Wheatbelt, Coolgardie, Esperance Plains, Geraldton Sandplains, Jarrah Forest and Mallee bioregions of south-western Western Australia and is listed as "not threatened".
