= Bardon Park =

Park in Australia

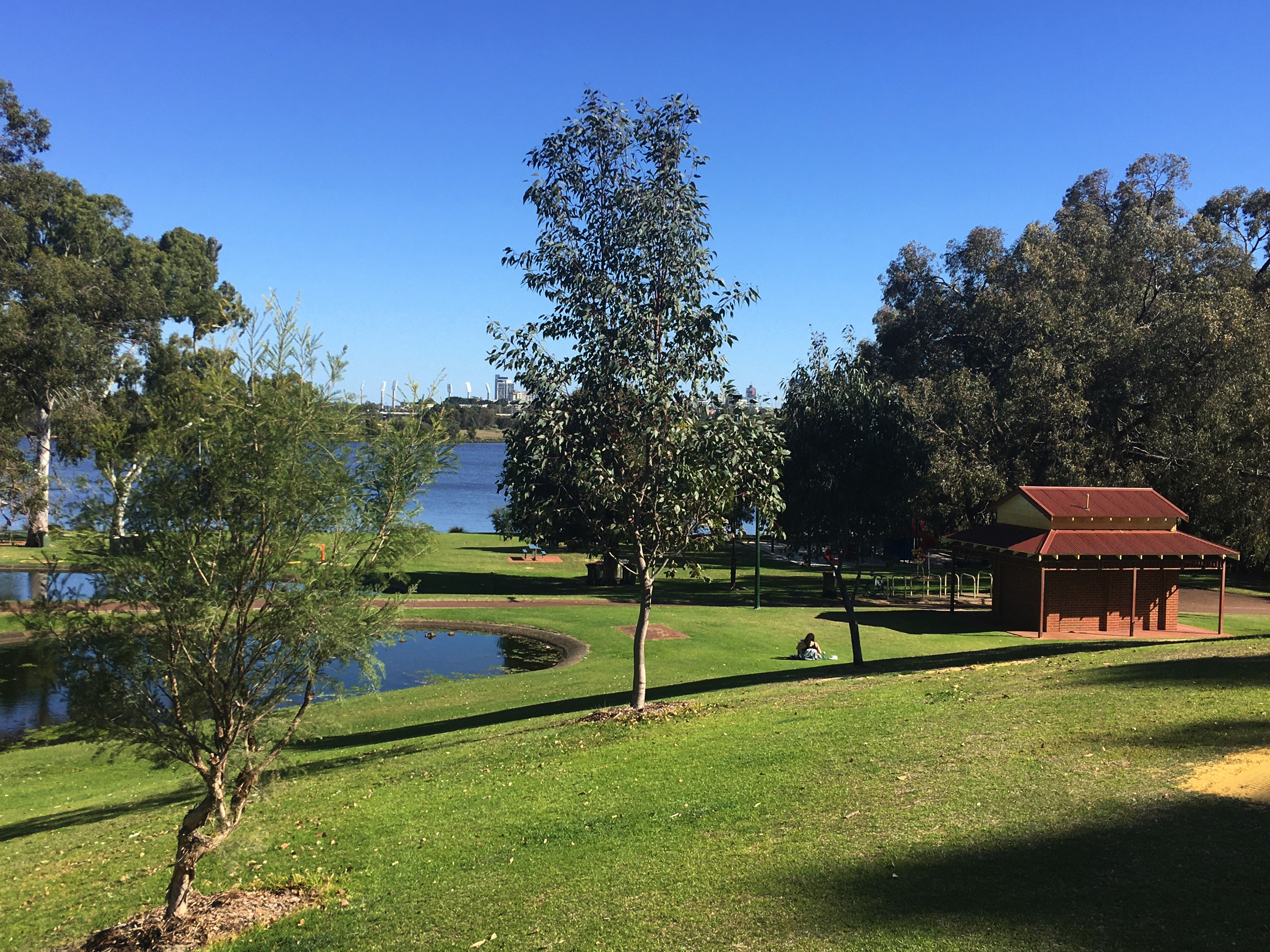
- Bardon Park in September 2021
- Interactive map of Bardon Park
- Type: Urban
- Location: Maylands, Western Australia
- Coordinates: 31.93583°S 115.8894°E

Bardon Park (also known as Malgamongup) is a park overlooking the Swan River in Maylands, suburb of Perth, Western Australia. It is considered one of Perth's most picturesque parks.

== Description and geography ==
Bardon Park is a large grassed park that slopes down towards the Swan River. Facilities include a barbeque, playground and sandpit, and public toilets.

== History ==
Historically, parts of what is now Bardon Park were natural fish traps.

The land went undeveloped during the 19th century, aside from occasional use for market gardening.

From 1926, the land was intended for use as a home for disabled children, but this never eventuated.

Bardon Park reserve was created in 1955 for recreation. It was named after William Frederick Stanley Bardon, who was the chairman of the Perth Roads Board from 1949 to 1953. It was managed by the City of Stirling until c. 2000, when it was transferred to the City of Bayswater alongside the rest of Maylands and neighbouring Mount Lawley.

Nearby residents concerned about the park incorporated the Bardon Park Riverside Restoration Group to address weeds in 2016. The park has been managed by the City of Bayswater since 2006.

A nature playground was developed for $175,000 and opened in March 2016. The playground features a rock garden which illustrates the six Noongar seasons.
