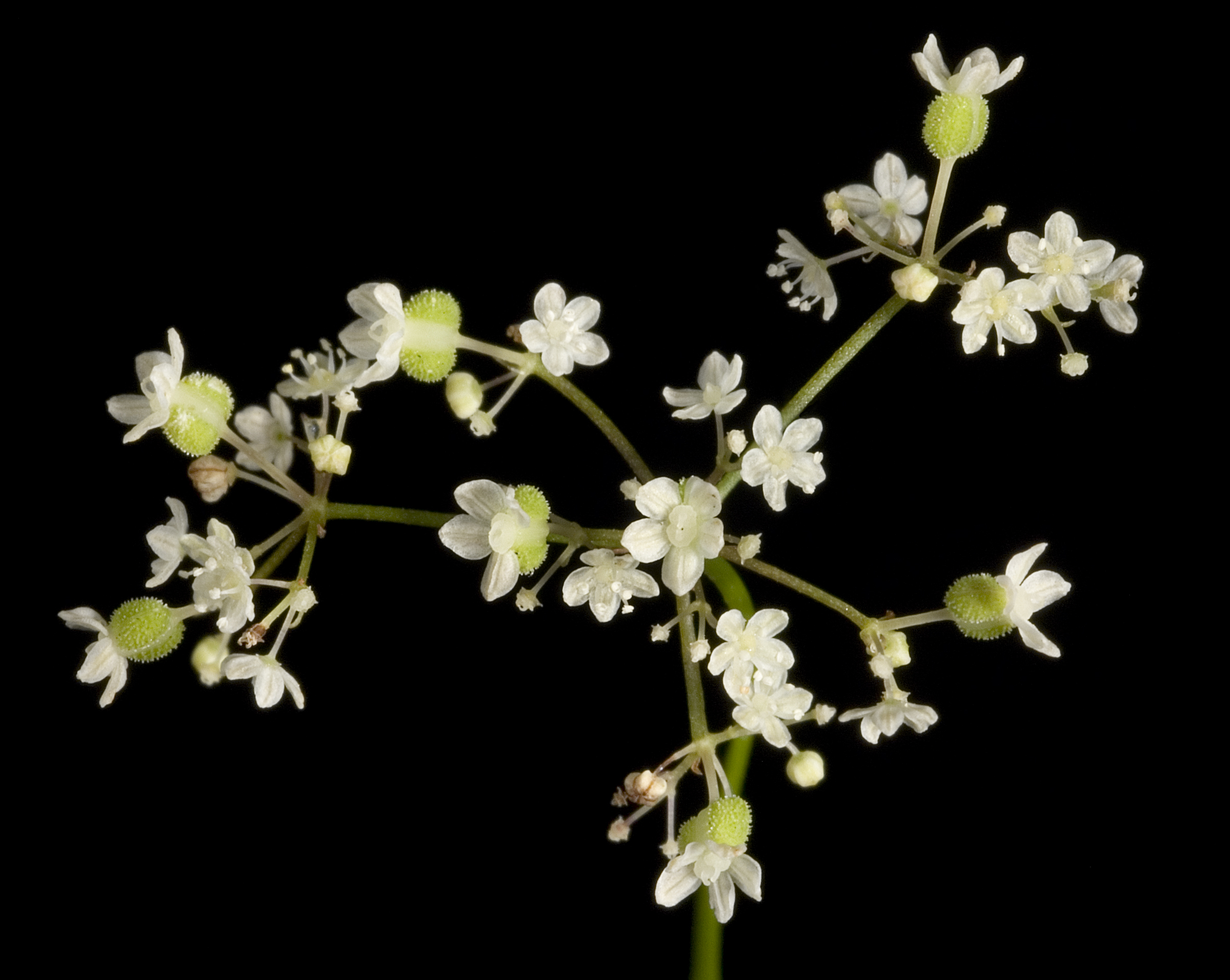

Scientific classification
- Kingdom: Plantae
- Clade: Tracheophytes
- Clade: Angiosperms
- Clade: Eudicots
- Clade: Asterids
- Order: Apiales
- Family: Apiaceae
- Genus: Platysace
- Species: P. compressa

Binomial name
- Platysace compressa (Labill.) C.Norman

Synonyms
- List: Azorella compressa Labill.; Siebera compressa (Labill.) Benth.; Siebera compressa (Labill.) Benth. var. compressa; Trachymene compressa (Labill.) Spreng.; Trachymene compressa (Labill.) Spreng. f. compressa; Trachymene compressa f. laevis Domin; Trachymene platyptera Bunge; Trachymene platyptera Bunge var. platyptera

= Platysace compressa =

Species of herb

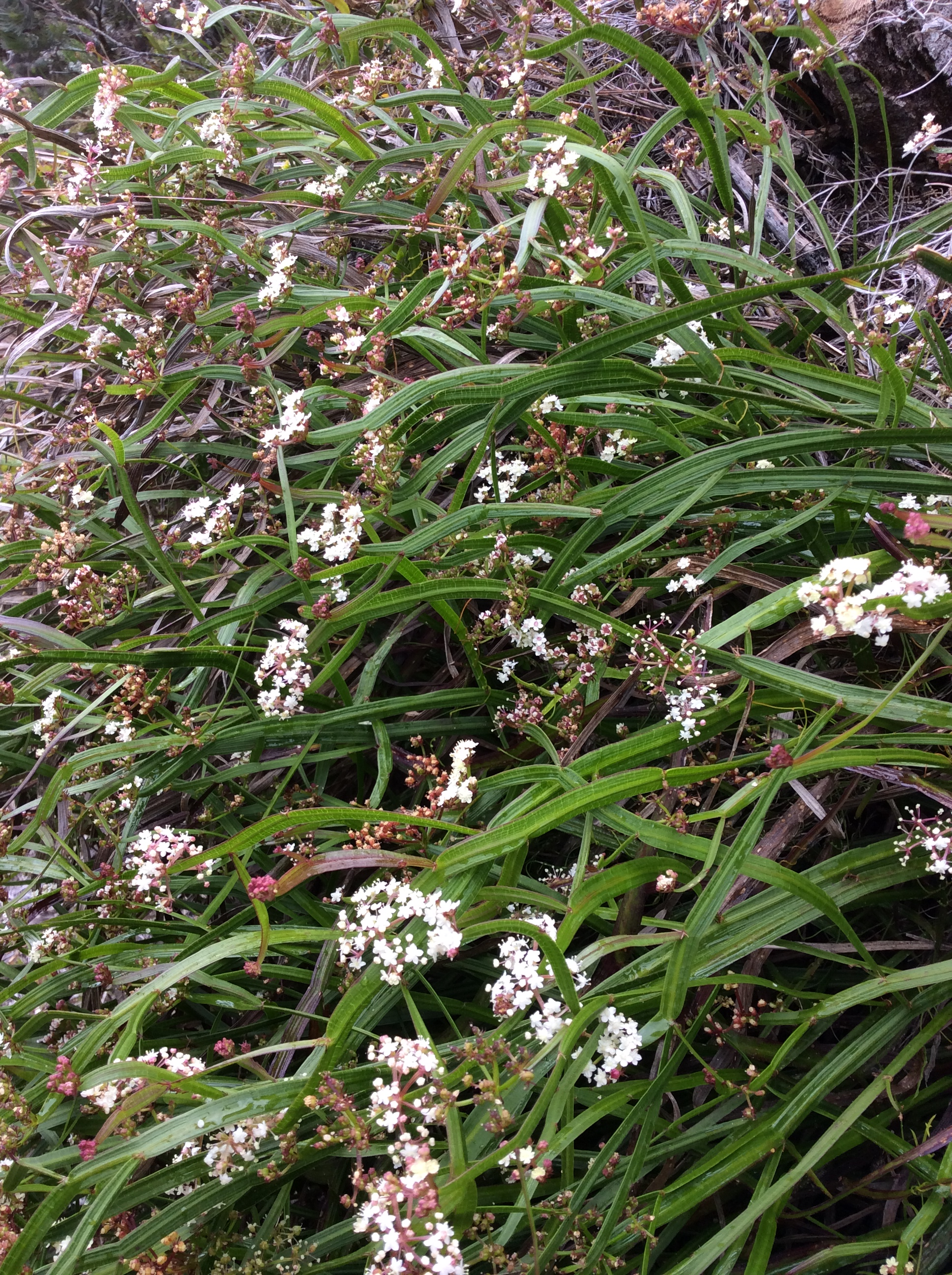
Habit at Albany Wind Farm

Platysace compressa, commonly known as tapeworm plant, is endemic to the south-west of Western Australia. It is an erect, ascending or low-lying perennial herb, sometimes with no leaves, or leaves reduced to scales, on flat, winged stems.

== Description ==
Platysace compressa is an erect, ascending or low-lying perennial herb that typically grows to a height of 0.15–1.2 m (5.9 in – 3 ft 11.2 in). Its stems are flat and rigid, striated and winged, sometimes 4–6.5 mm (0.16–0.26 in) wide. The leaves are small and scale-like, or absent. White or cream-coloured flowers are borne on the ends of branches in compound umbels with thin spreading rays, some of the longer rays with umbellules, sometimes also compound. Flowering occurs from September to March or from January to March.

== Taxonomy ==
This species was first formally described in 1805 by Jacques Labillardière who gave it the name Azorella compressa in his Novae Hollandiae Plantarum Specimen. In 1939, Cecil Norman transferred the species to the genus Platysace as P. compressa in the Journal of Botany, British and Foreign. The specific epithet (compressa) refers to the flattened stems of this plant.

== Distribution and habitat ==
Platysace compressa grows on coastal limestone and sand dunes, sometimes on granite hills and outcrops in the Esperance Plains, Jarrah Forest, Mallee, Swan Coastal Plain and Warren bioregions of south-western Western Australia.
