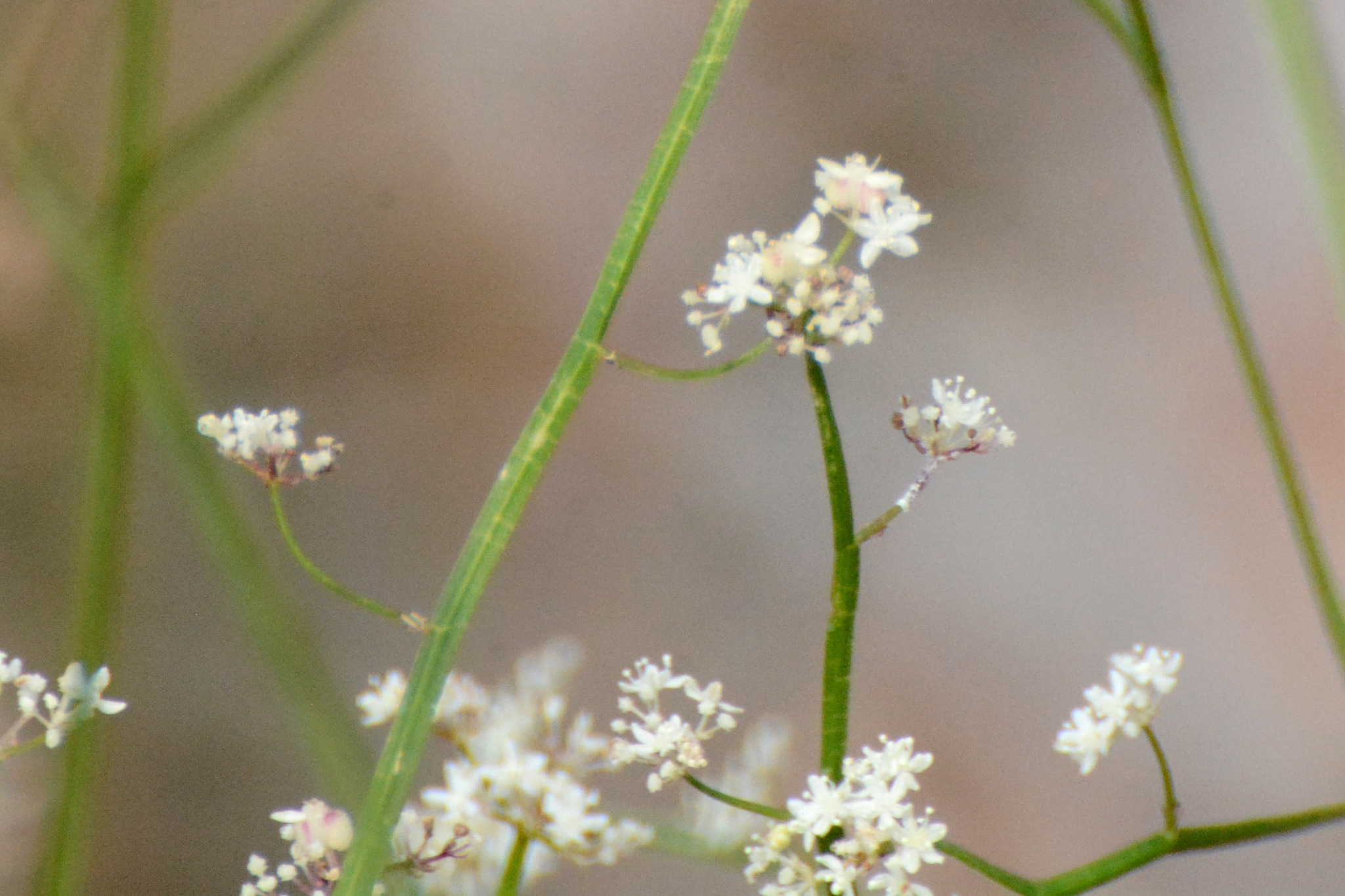
- In Kalamunda National Park

Scientific classification
- Kingdom: Plantae
- Clade: Tracheophytes
- Clade: Angiosperms
- Clade: Eudicots
- Clade: Asterids
- Order: Apiales
- Family: Apiaceae
- Genus: Platysace
- Species: P. filiformis

Binomial name
- Platysace filiformis (Bunge) C.Norman

Synonyms
- Siebera compressa var. filiformis (Bunge) Benth.; Trachymene filiformis Bunge

= Platysace filiformis =

Species of flowering plant

Platysace filiformis is a species of flowering plant in the family Apiaceae and is endemic to the south-west of Western Australia. It is an erect or sprawling, perennial herb or shrub with flat, winged stems with few leaves and white or cream-coloured flowers arranged in compound umbels.

== Description ==
Platysace filiformis is an erect or sprawling perennial herb or shrub, with rigid stems 15–60 cm (5.9–23.6 in) high. The stems are very flat and bordered by 2 wings, sometimes narrow or up to 4–8 mm (0.16–0.31 in) wide. The leaves are small, few in number, or reduced to small scales. The flowers are white or cream-coloured and arranged in compound umbels 12–25 mm (0.47–0.98 in) wide on the ends of branches with 2 or 3 of the rays sometimes divided into secondary umbels. Flowering occurs throughout the year and the fruit is about 1.6 mm (0.063 in) long and 2 mm (0.079 in) wide.

== Taxonomy ==
This species was first formally described in 1845 by Alexander Andrejewitsch von Bunge who gave it the name Trachymene filiformis in Lehmann's Plantae Preissianae from specimens collected near Perth in 1839. In 1939, Cecil Norman transferred the species to Platysace as P. filiformis in the Journal of Botany, British and Foreign. The specific epithet (filiformis) means "thread-like".

== Habitat ==
Platysace filiformis grows in near-coastal areas, often in moist soil, and occurs in the Avon Wheatbelt, Esperance Plains, Jarrah Forest, Swan Coastal Plain and Warren bioregions of south-western Western Australia.
