= Mugii Murum-ban State Conservation Area =

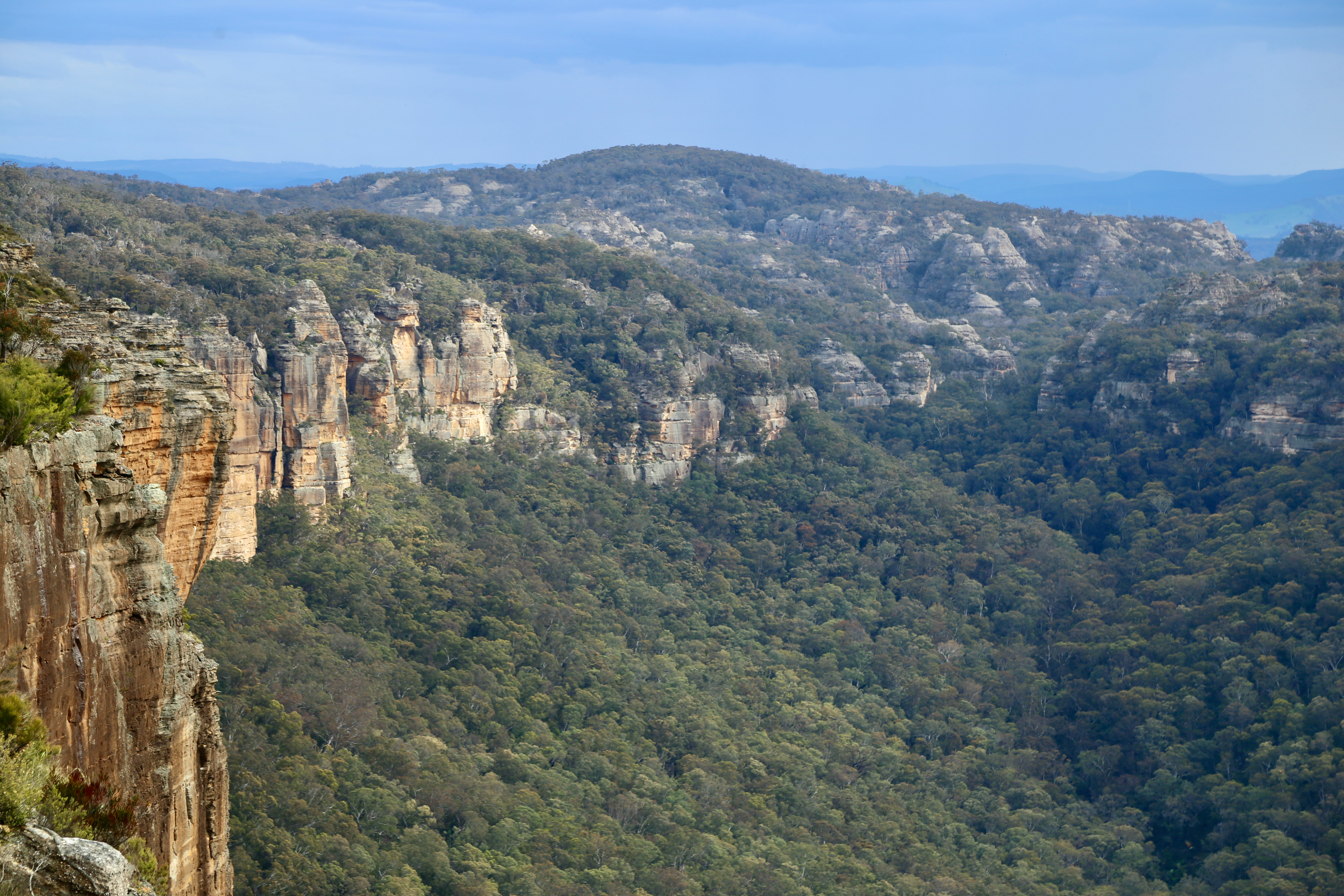
- Genowlan Plateau viewed from Genowlan Point

- Location within New South Wales
- Location: New South Wales
- Nearest city: Capertee
- Coordinates: 33.11°S 150.07°E
- Area: 36.5 km^{2} (14.1 sq mi)
- Established: 2011
- Governing body: NSW National Parks & Wildlife Service
- Website: Official website

Mugii Murum-ban State Conservation Area is north of Lithgow, north-east of Capertee and south-east of Mudgee.

The park is 3,650 hectares in area and is bounded to the south by the Glen Davis Road and Gardens of Stone National Park, and to the north by Capertee National Park. Land to the east and west is largely cleared farming land, with some remnant bushland. Lands not included in the park include Airly Gap Trail and a number of partially cleared private properties along Airly Gap Trail and at the base of the Genowlan mesa.

The park contains a variety of ecosystems and supports several threatened plants and animals and two threatened ecological communities. The park also contains mineral deposits including deposits of coal.

== History ==
Mugii Murum-ban is the Wiradjuri name of Charlie Riley. Mugii means 'a mopoke owl' and murum-ban means ‘eldest son’.

The area is of particular significance to the Wiradjuri Aboriginal People. It also contains numerous significant historic heritage sites particularly mining related.

== Geology ==
Mugii Murum-ban State Conservation Area is dominated by two prominent mesas, Genowlan and Airly Mountains, that rise 500 metres from the Capertee Valley. The area is one of dramatic valleys and canyons surrounded by cliffs and rock formations known as pagodas.

== Genowlan Mesa ==
The Genowlan mesa is topped by hundreds of 'pagoda' rock formations. Notable formations include the 'Citadel', the 'Valley of the Kings', and the 'Grotto' with 20-metre-tall (66 ft) Brown Barrel eucalypt trees and 4-metre-tall (13 ft) tree ferns. Over 340 plant and 75 mammal and bird species can be found. Small areas of basalt on top of the sandstone add to the diversity. The narrow sandstone headland of Genowlan Point is home to a unique and relict plant community which comprises Johnson's Grass Tree, Allocasuarina nana and Micromyrtus sessilis.

== Mount Airly ==
Mount Airly lies to the west of Genowlan Mountain and is separated from it by Airly Gap. The underlying oil shale deposits were developed for oil export by individual miners in 1893. Extraction occurred on the slopes of Airly Gap and also on the western side of Mount Airly. The New Hartley 'ghost town' near Airly Gap has remnants of tunnels, cableways, shale oil retorts, steam engines, dwellings, 'stone houses, transportation and mine ventilation chimneys. The ruins are on the New South Wales Heritage List. The northern and western edges of Mount Airly feature dramatic pagodas.

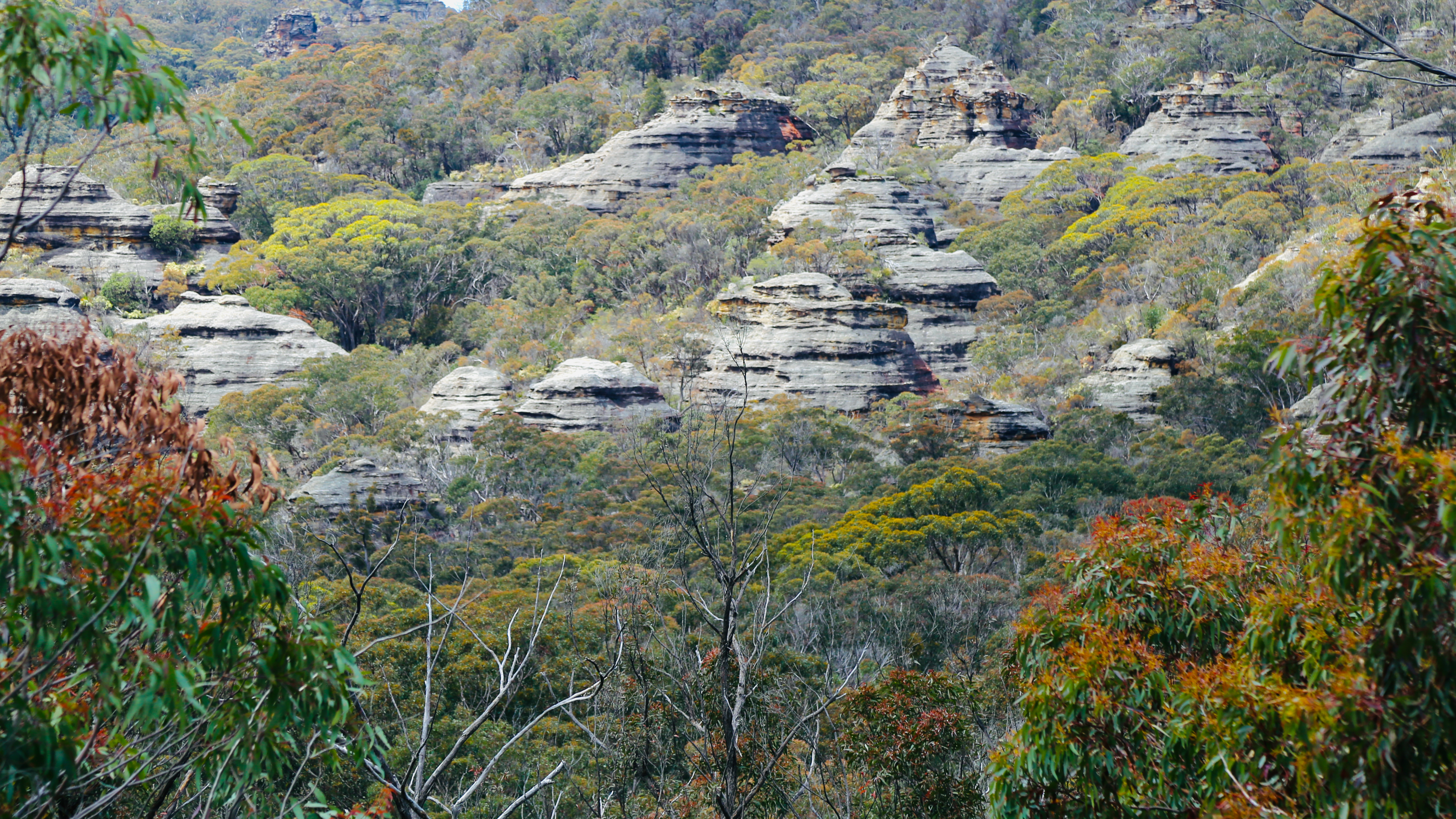
"Pagoda" rock formations, Genowlan Mesa

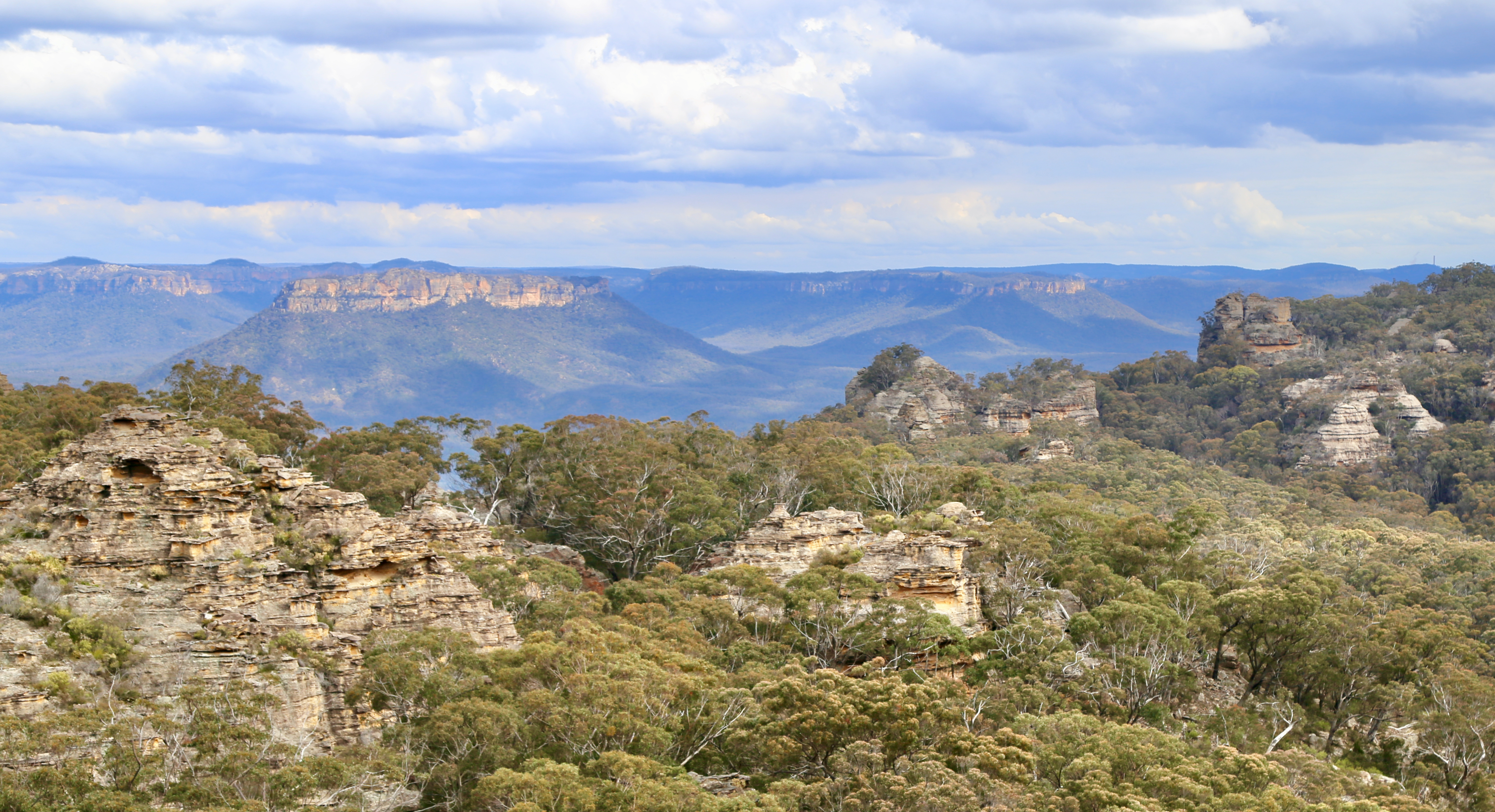
Capertee Valley, including Pantoneys Crown, from the Genowlan Mesa

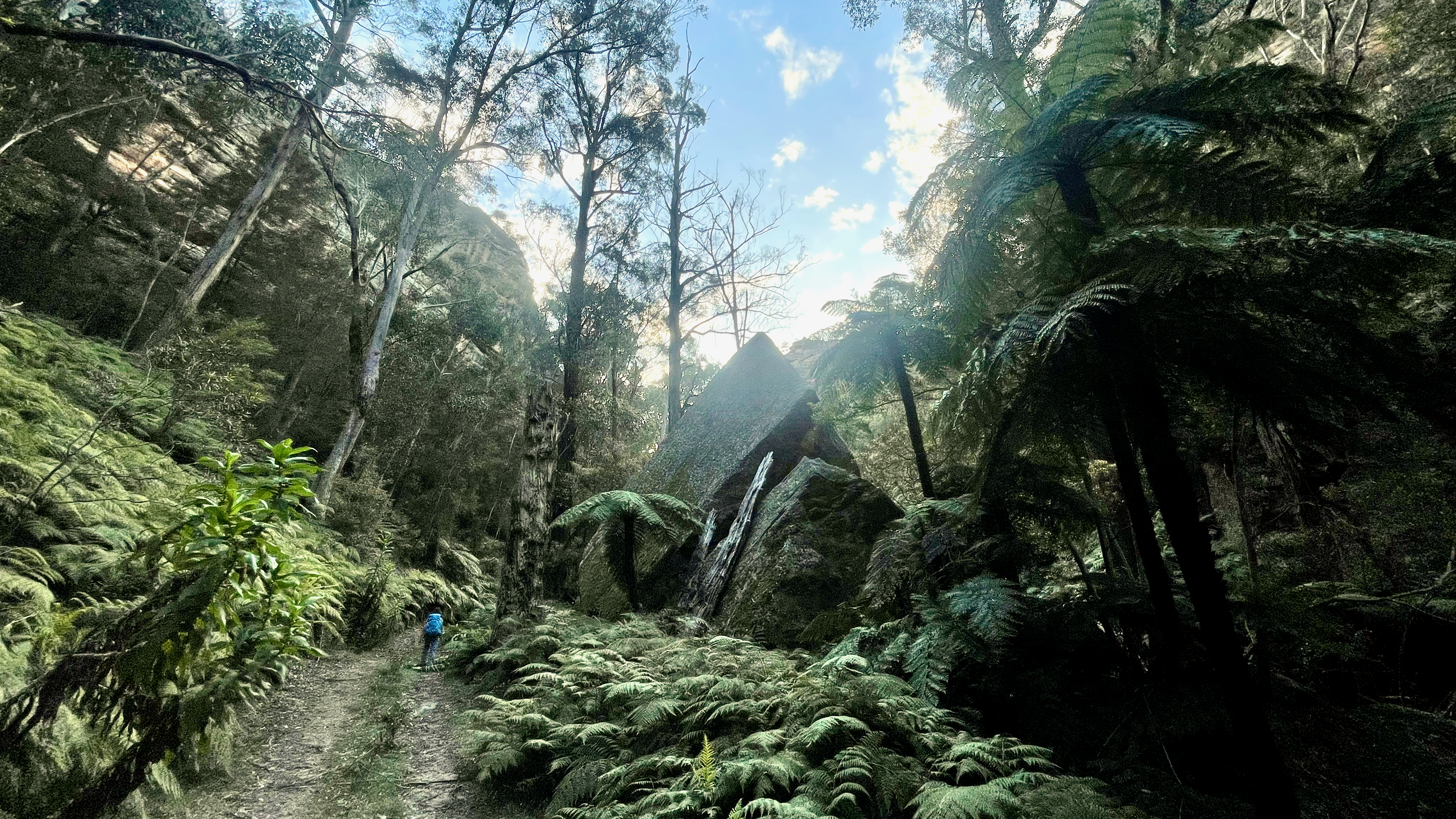
Fire trail on the Genowlan Mesa

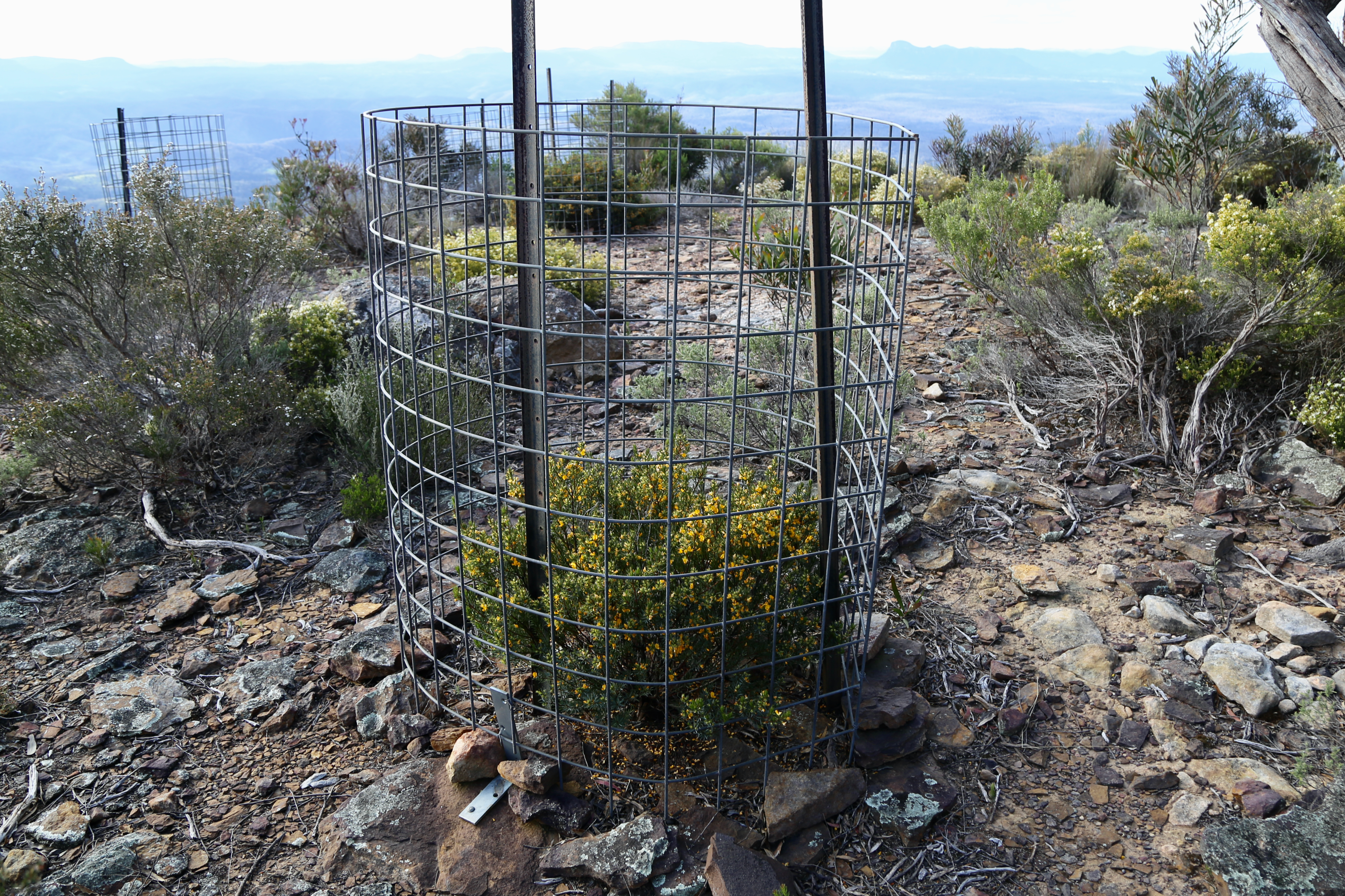
Protection for the threatened Genowlan Point Pea (Pultenaea sp. Genowlan Pt)

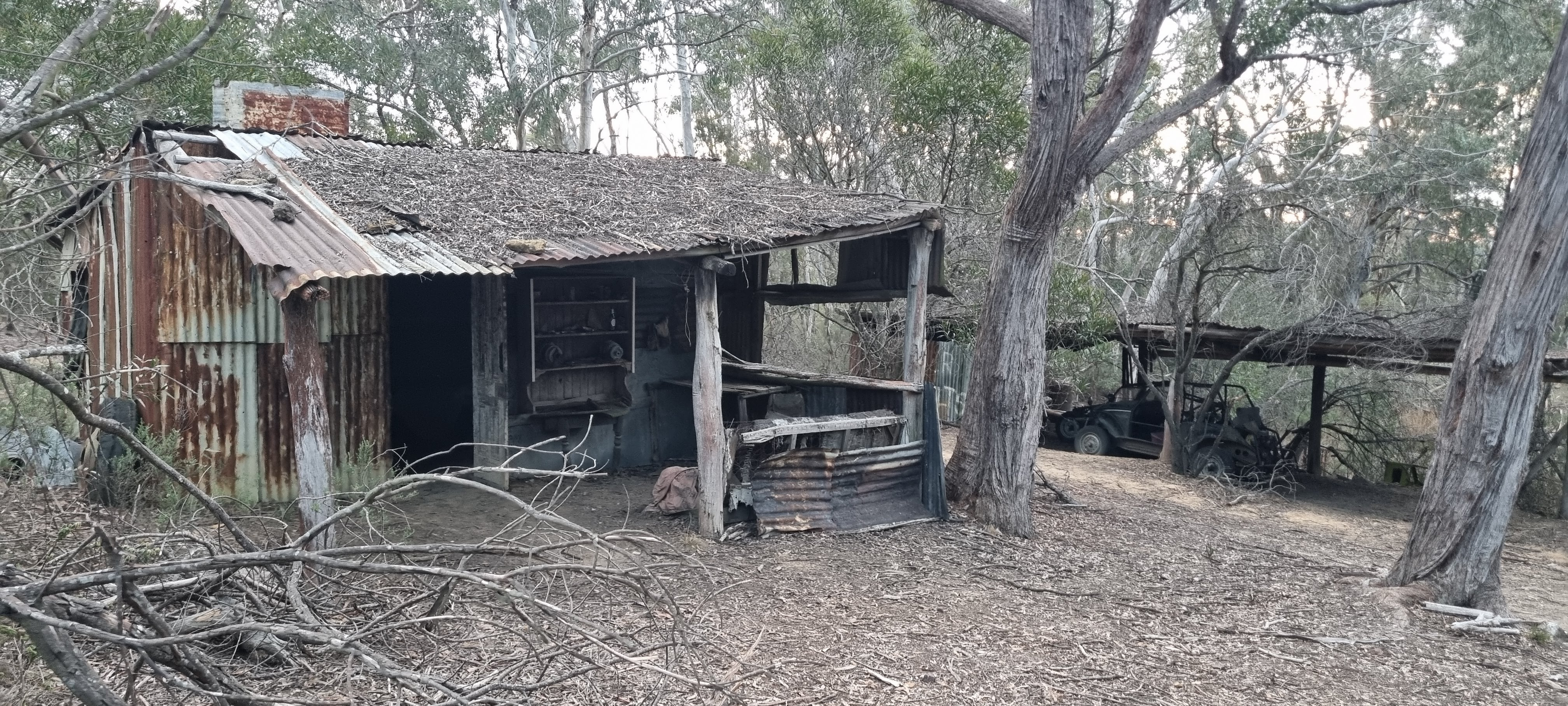
An abandoned hut from the era of oil shale mining

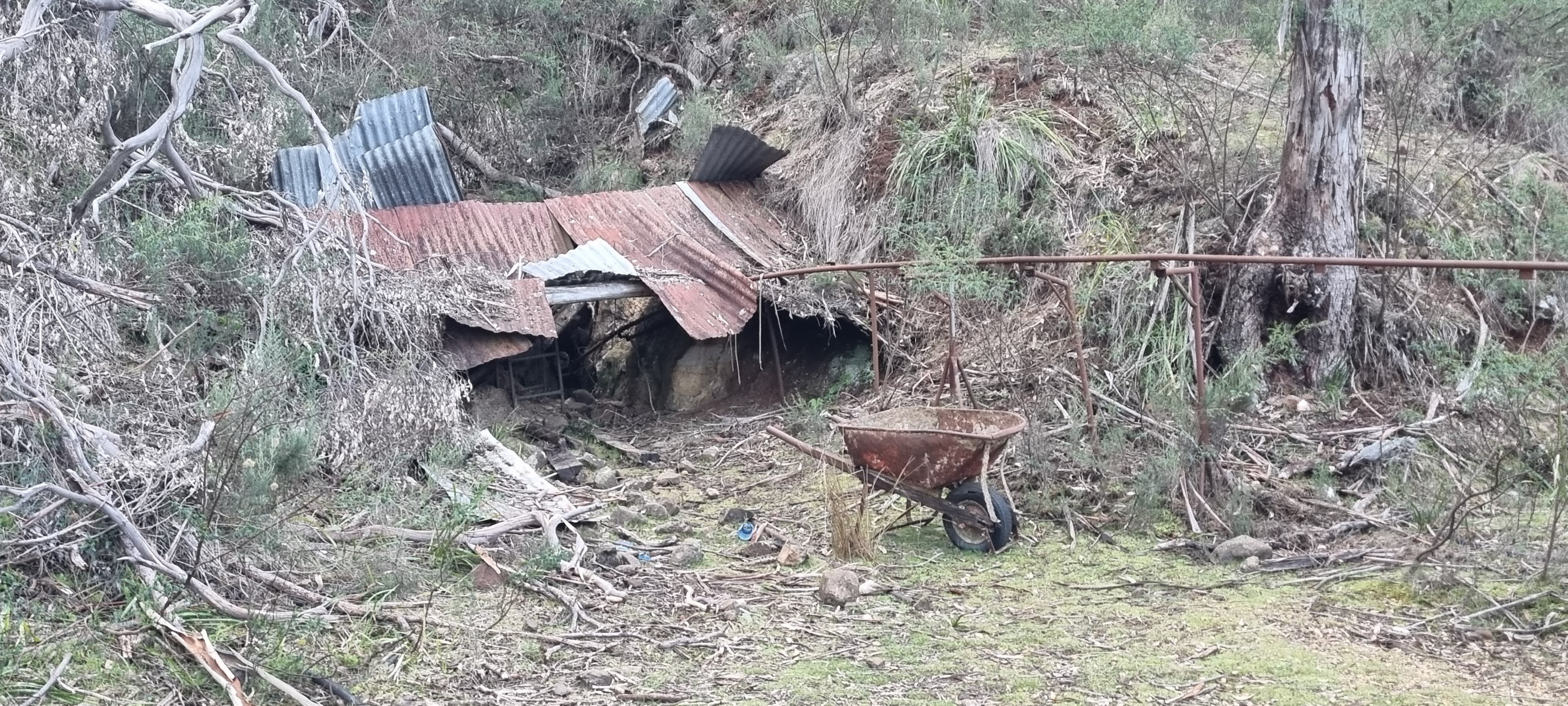
A cableway used for mining

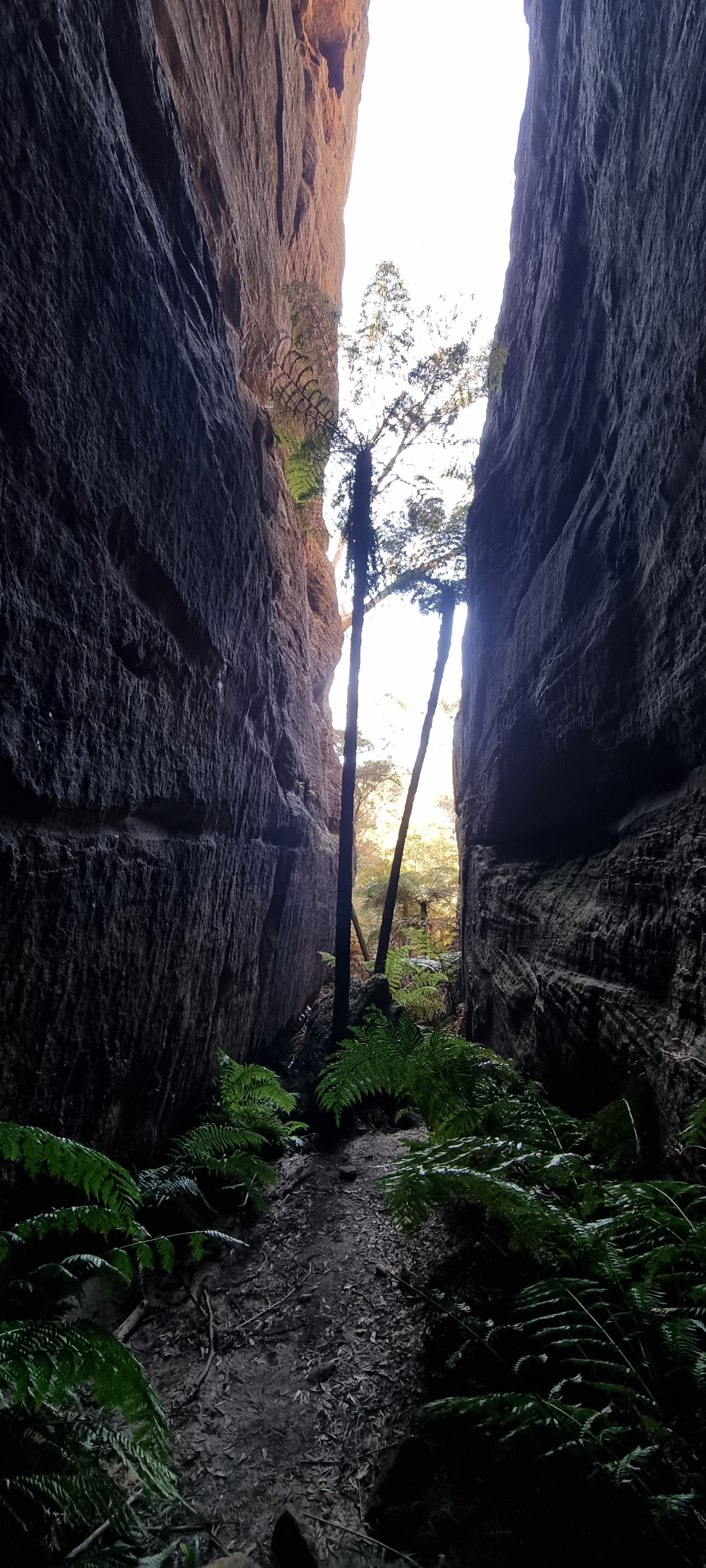
A slot canyon known as "Ultimate Slot"
