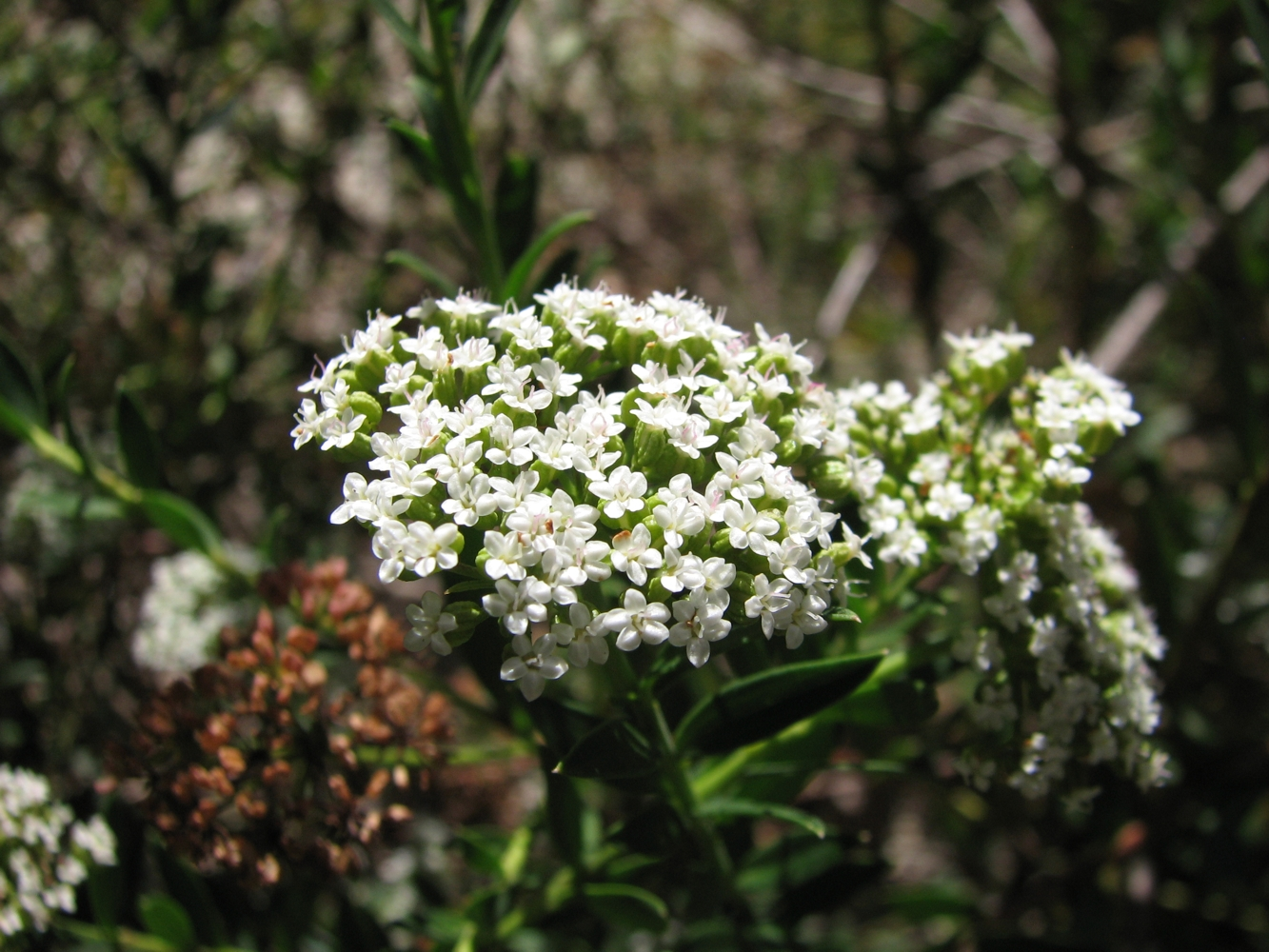

Scientific classification
- Kingdom: Plantae
- Clade: Tracheophytes
- Clade: Angiosperms
- Clade: Eudicots
- Clade: Asterids
- Order: Apiales
- Family: Apiaceae
- Genus: Platysace
- Species: P. lanceolata

Binomial name
- Platysace lanceolata (Labill.) Druce

Synonyms
- List: Azorella lanceolata Labill.; Fischera lanceolata (Labill.) Sm. nom. illeg.; Siebera billardierei Benth.; Siebera billardierei Benth. var. billardierei; Siebera billardierei var. lanceolata (Labill.) Benth.; Siebera lanceolata (Labill.) Druce; Trachymene billardierei (Benth.) F.Muell.; Trachymene billardierei (Benth.) F.Muell. var. billardierei; Trachymene billardierei var. lanceolata (Labill.) Domin; Trachymene billardierei var. lanceolata (Labill.) Maiden & Betche isonym; Trachymene lanceolata (Labill.) Spreng.; Trachymene lanceolata (Labill.) Spreng. var. lanceolata; Trachymene lanceolata var. typica Domin nom. inval.

= Platysace lanceolata =

Shrubby platyscace

Species of shrub

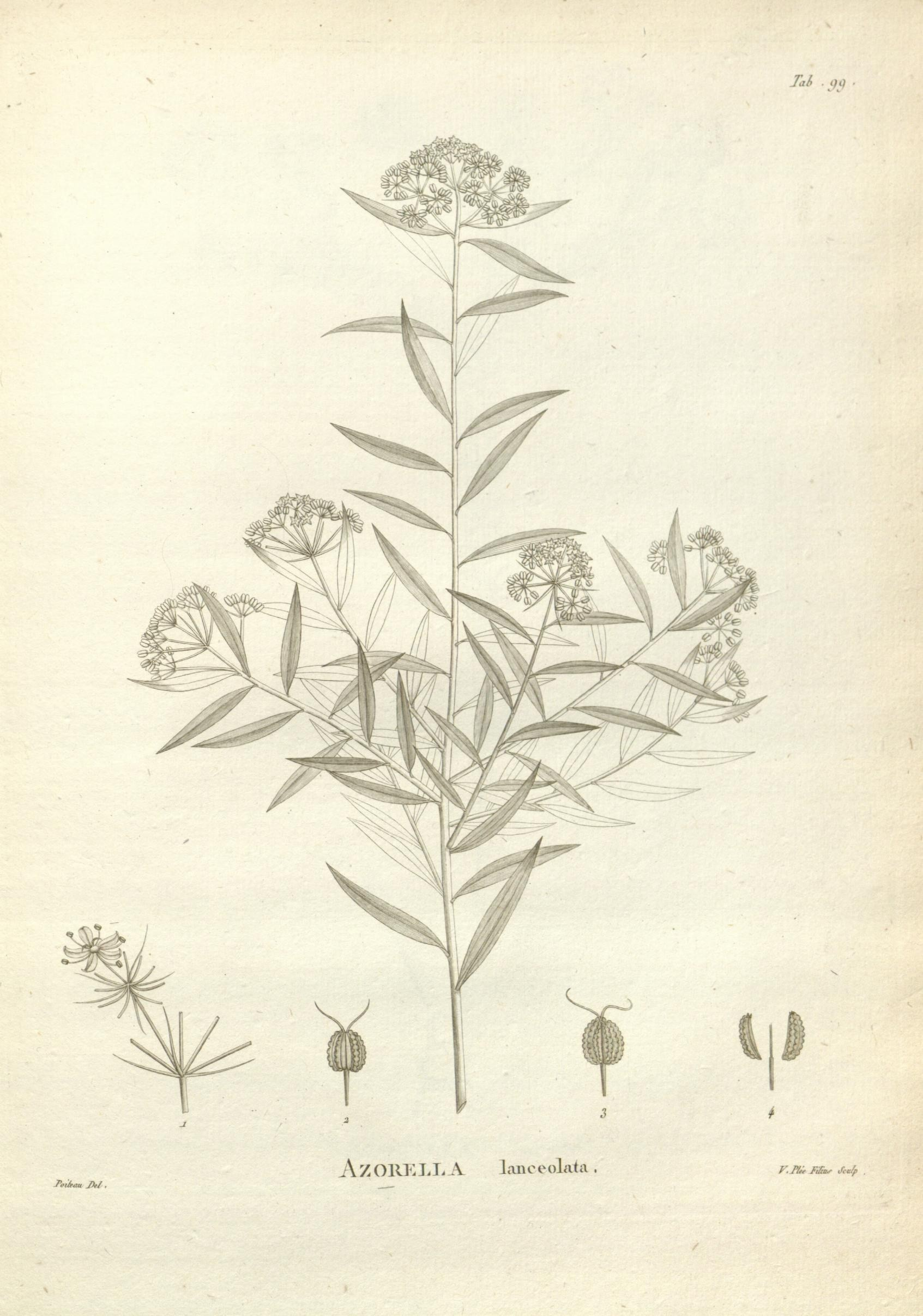
Illustration of Azorella lanceolata by Pierre Antoine Poiteau from Labillardière's Novae Hollandiae Plantarum Specimen

Platysace lanceolata, commonly known as shrubby platysace, is a flowering plant in the family Apiaceae and is endemic to south-eastern Australia. It is small, upright shrub with variable shaped leaves and white flowers.

== Description ==
Platyscace lanceolata is an upright or widely spreading shrub to 1.5 m (4 ft 11 in) with stems usually covered in short, soft hairs. The leaves are a dull green, narrow to broadly elliptic, occasionally more or less circular, arranged alternately, 10–50 mm (0.39–1.97 in) long and 4–15 mm (0.16–0.59 in) wide, smooth margins, base heart-shaped, and the apex pointed or rounded. The inflorescence has cream-white flowers in an umbel 15–50 mm (0.59–1.97 in) in diameter, bracts elliptic or linear in shape, 2–7 mm (0.079–0.276 in) long, and on a peduncle 5–30 mm (0.20–1.18 in) long. Flowering occurs from September to March and the fruit 1.5–2 mm (0.059–0.079 in) long, 1.5–2.1 mm (0.059–0.083 in) wide and warty.

== Taxonomy and naming ==
The species was first formally described by French naturalist Jacques Labillardière in 1805 in the first volume of Novae Hollandiae Plantarum Specimen and given the name Azorella lanceolata. The species was transferred to the genus Platysace in 1917 by English botanist George Claridge Druce and the description was published in The Botanical Exchange Club and Society of the British Isles Report for 1916, Suppl.2

== Distribution and habitat ==
This platysace is a common, widespread species found growing in heath, scrub, open forests, and sometimes sandy situations in New South Wales, Victoria and Queensland.
