= Indigenous Australian seasons =

Systems of weather seasons used by Indigenous Australians

Indigenous Australian seasons are classified differently from the traditional four-season calendar used by most western European peoples. Aboriginal Australians and Torres Strait Islander people have distinct ways of dividing the year up. Naming and understanding of seasons differs among groups of Aboriginal peoples, and depends on the groups geolocation within Australia.

The Australian Bureau of Meteorology and the The Commonwealth Scientific and Industrial Research Organisation (CSIRO) have both worked with various groups to produce information about a number of Aboriginal and Torres Strait Islander seasonal calendars.

== Background ==
Aboriginal and Torres Strait Islander peoples observe the position of the stars in the sky and follow water, plant and animal cycles as ways of identifying seasonal phenomena. The seasonal calendars of different Aboriginal and Torres Strait Islander cultural groups demonstrate an understanding of the interdependence and interrelationships amongst living things. They use their calendars to predict seasonal changes and weather patterns to determine the availability of particular resources or the timing of journeys.

The calendars vary according to geographic location, ecological context and cultural interpretation. Specific biotic events, often referred to as bio-indicators, can occur locally or over great distances, enabling accurate predictions of seasonal changes. For instance, the appearance of particular insect species may be an indication that the wet season is approaching, indicating that it is time to harvest yams. Observations of cyclical animal behavioural patterns are also important, for example when the D'harawal people of the Sydney basin area hear the mating cries of tiger quolls, or the lillipilli fruit has started to ripen and once the fruit starts falling, it is a sign for the people of this country to begin their annual journey to the coast, to seek out other seasonal resources.

These Seasonal markers, indicators and calendars continue to be used by many groups today. The publication of First Nations' calendars has revealed the immense observational scientific knowledge held by the respective communities and has informed Western scientific understandings across a wide range of disciplines, for example, botany, zoology, ecology, meteorology and many more.

== BOM and CSIRO resources ==
The Bureau of Meteorology (BOM) and the CSIRO have both worked with various groups to produce Aboriginal and Torres Strait Islander seasonal calendars. BOM has produced an interactive map, and both BOM and the CSIRO have also documented the seasonal calendars of many Aboriginal groups in detail. Both sites provide downloadable and printable posters showing each group's calendar.

== Some Aboriginal seasons ==
=== North coast – Yolngu seasons ===
The Yolngu, the Aboriginal Australians of north-east Arnhem Land, identify six seasons. Non-Indigenous people living in the Top End usually identify two: the wet and the dry. (Arguably, the build-up period between dry and wet is coming to be identified as a distinct third season.) The six Yolngu seasons, and their characteristics, are:

Season name	Period	Weather	Flora and fauna	Seasonal activities
Mirdawarr	Late March, April	End of wet season with scattered showers. Wind in south-east quarter but air still hot and humid.	Vegetable foods becoming plentiful. Fish numerous.	People generally sedentary & living in big camps. Nomadic movement restricted by floodwaters. Long rank grass and mosquitoes. Macassar traders used to depart at this time with south-east winds. Goose-hunting expeditions into swamps. Fishing, especially large-scale communal fishing operations and drives where floodwaters receding; including basket traps in weirs, nets and the gurl in use only in the valley of the Glyde River.
Dhaarratharramirri	Late April, May, June, July, August	South-east or dry season. Wind in east and south-east		People nomadic; big wet-season camps breaking up. Systematic burning of all extensive grassed areas, communal drives for kangaroo, bandicoots, goanna. Fishing still important, with nets, grass barriers, in shallow waters on plains & salt pans. August to November (inclusive) is the most important period for ceremonial activities.
Rarranhdharr	September, October	Hot dry season. Hot periods towards close of dry (south-east) season. Wind chiefly north-east, lightning frequent and first thunder heard.	Stringybark in flower.	Nomadic activities lessen after burning of grass. Poisoning of fish in waters now concentrated by evaporation. Fish spearing continues in estuarine & coastal waters. Important ceremonial time.
Worlmamirri	Late October, November, December	The 'nose of the wet season', with or bringing thunder - late October. Period of maximum heat and humidity immediately before the rain season, characterised by violent thunder storms of increasing frequency.		Nomadic activities much restricted. People generally in camps near permanent water.
Baarramirri	Late December, January	Short season with wind in north-west; breaking of the wet. Also called munydjutjmirri from the fruit of munydjutj. Two kinds of north-west wind recognised: (i) Baarra yindi, the big, or male, baarra; (ii) Baarra nyukukurniny, the small, or female, baarra. The first refers to the more boisterous north-west gales, the second to the gentler breezes from the north-west.		Macassar fleets used to arrive with north-west winds and disperse to regular sites for trepang fishing. People concentrated in wet season camps leading almost sedentary life. Inland travel restricted by floods and dense growth of rank grass.
Gurnmul or Waltjarnmirri	January, February, March	Wet season proper. Two phases, the first, girritjarra is again subdivided into three.		People concentrated in camps. Inland travel restricted by floods.

=== Central – Anangu Pitjantjajara seasons ===
The Anangu Pitjantjatjara of northern South Australia and the southern part of the Northern Territory live in central Australia. Examples of some of their seasons include:

Season name	Period	Weather	Flora and fauna	Seasonal activities
Wanitjunkupai	April, May	The beginning of the cold weather. Clouds start around April but usually don't bring rain. They come from the south, brought mainly by westerly winds, and sit low over the hills till late in the day.	Reptiles hibernate. (Wanitjunkupai literally means "hibernate").	
Wari	Late May, June, July	The cold time when there is frost and mist or dew every morning, but little rain.		
Piriyakutu/ Piriya-Piriya	~August, September	This is when the priya comes – a warm steady wind from the north and west.	Animals breed. Food plants flower, fruit and seed. Hibernating reptiles come out and the honey grevillea is in bloom.	A good time for hunting kangaroo.
Mai Wiyaringkupai / Kuli	~December	Hottest season. Storm clouds and lightning, but little rain. Lightning strikes can start fires.	Not much food around at this time.	
Itjanu / Inuntjji	January, February, March	Overcast clouds usually bring rain.	Food plants flower. If rains are good there is plenty of fruit and seed.	

=== South-western Australia– Noongar seasons ===
Noongar seasons do not follow a rigid cycle; timing is dependent on subtle changes in the weather with wind, rain and temperature. The cycles are part of katitjin-bidi ('knowledge trails') that lead groups to reliable sources of food and water. The seasons are named as follows by the Whadjuk Noongar people of Perth:

Season name	Period	Weather	Flora and fauna	Seasonal activities
Bunuru (second summer)	February, March	Hot, dry, easterly and north winds.	Fish – tailor and mullet – in shallow water. Macrozamia riedlei fruiting. Wattle (Acacia) and banksia in blossom.	Trapping fish (coasts and estuaries). Collecting frogs, marron, gilgies, tortoises from wetlands. Climbing trees for possums. Collecting Macrozamia fruit and removing toxin. Pounding the horizontal rhizomes of the bulrush (Typha domingensis) into a cake and roasting it. Collecting the bulb of Haemodorum spicatum and roasting for a spice. Collecting wattle and banksia blossoms and various roots.
Djeran (autumn)	April, May	Cooling, south-west winds.		Group fishing at lakes and weirs (inland). Continued fishing at estuaries. Collecting edible bulbs and seeds.
Makuru (winter)	June, July	Cold, rain, westerly gales.	Black swans begin moulting, making them unable to fly.	Moving inland to hunt, when the watersheds fill. Hunting black swans. Collecting Tribonanthus tubers. Keeping warm by holding smouldering bull Banksia branches (Banksia grandis) beneath bookas (skin cloaks).
Djilba (first spring)	August, September	Warming.		Collecting roots. Digging out Platysace cirrosa tubers from under wandoo. Hunting of emus, quenda, kangaroos, possums.
Kambarang (second spring)	October, November	Rain lessening.	Astroloma and desert quandong (Santalum acuminatum) fruiting.	Movement to the coast. Sweet gum gathered by removing the bark from the WA Christmas tree (Nuytsia floribunda). Collection of yams (Dioscorea hastifolia and Platysace cirrosa). Collection of eggs from waterfowl and other birds. Catching of tortoises, frogs, gilgie. Trapping of possums and kangaroos.
Birak (first summer)	December, January	Hot, dry, daytime easterly breezes, late afternoon south-west sea breezes.	Banksia in flower.	Gathering banksia flowers for honey. Catching bronzewing pigeons. Controlled burning for hunting, and to assist regrowth.

== Torres Strait Islands seasons ==
In the Torres Strait Islands, the seasons are associated with the way the wind blows and changes in the environment. The four seasons based on the wind are known as Kuki, Zey (Zei in Masig), Nay Gay (Nai Gai in Masig) and Sager (Zoerr):

- During Kuki, from January until April, the strong north-west winds (strong winds) and bring the wet season (monsoon).
- From May to December it is Sager/Zoerr, when the south-east trade winds blow, and the weather is dry.
- Southerly winds blow at different and unpredictable times during the year, and these times are known as Zey/Zei.
- During Nay Gay/Naigai, from October through to December, northerly winds predominate, bringing high heat and humidity.

The people of Masig (otherwise known as Yorke Island), known as the Masigalgal, are part of the Kulkulgal nation of the central Torres Strait. The timing and duration of these four seasons varies from year to year, and Masig islanders observe signs in the winds, weather, sea life, plants and animals that tell them when one season is expected to change to another. Community celebrations, hunting, gardening and cultural activities are based around this annual cycle of resource availability and renewal.

== Sources ==
- Entwisle, Timothy 2014, Sprinter and Sprummer, Melbourne ISBN 9781486302031.
- Thomson, D., & Peterson, N., 1983, Donald Thomson in Arnhem Land, Miegunyah Press, Melbourne. Revised ed. publ. 2003, ISBN 0-522-85063-4, pp172–3.
- Uluru—Kata Tjuta National Park Visitor guide, Welcome to Aboriginal land, Colemans Printing, Darwin, January 2006, pp24–25.
