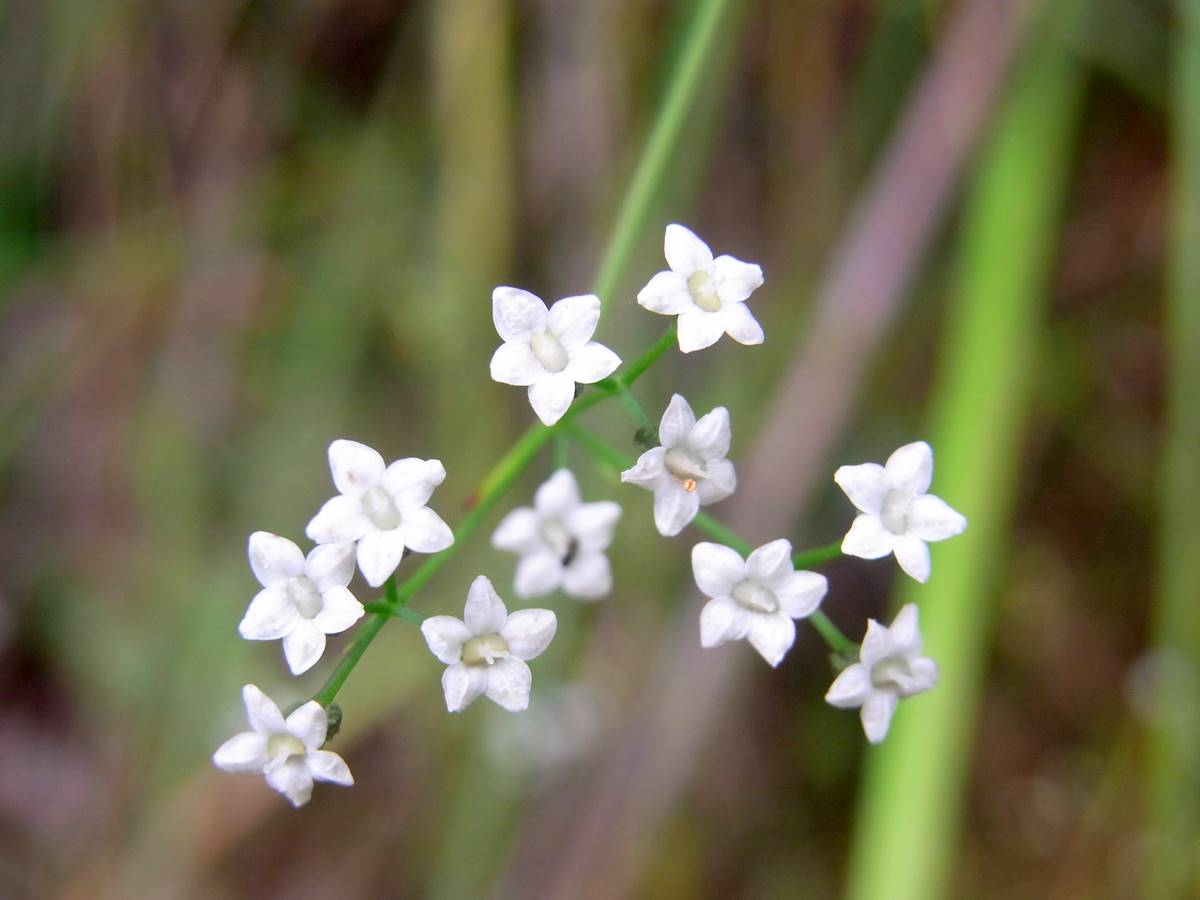
- Ku-ring-gai Chase National Park, Australia

Scientific classification
- Kingdom: Plantae
- Clade: Tracheophytes
- Clade: Angiosperms
- Clade: Eudicots
- Clade: Asterids
- Order: Apiales
- Family: Apiaceae
- Genus: Platysace
- Species: P. linearifolia

Binomial name
- Platysace linearifolia (Cav.) Norman

= Platysace linearifolia =

Species of shrub

Platysace linearifolia, known as carrot tops, is a slender shrub, found growing on poor sandy soils in eastern Australia, north of Jervis Bay. It may form large colonies and is easily noticed in the late summer and autumn when covered in small white flowers. It grows from 40 cm to 1.5 metres tall. A feature of this plant is the linear leaves, 10 to 25 mm long, and 0.5 to 1 mm wide. The fruit is 2 mm long and wide, with tubercles.

First collected in Sydney, it was described by the Spanish botanist Antonio José Cavanilles in 1799. The generic name is from the Greek meaning “a flat shield”, describing the fruit. The specific epithet refers to the straight thin leaves. The reference to carrots in the common name is due to this plant being placed in the carrot family.
