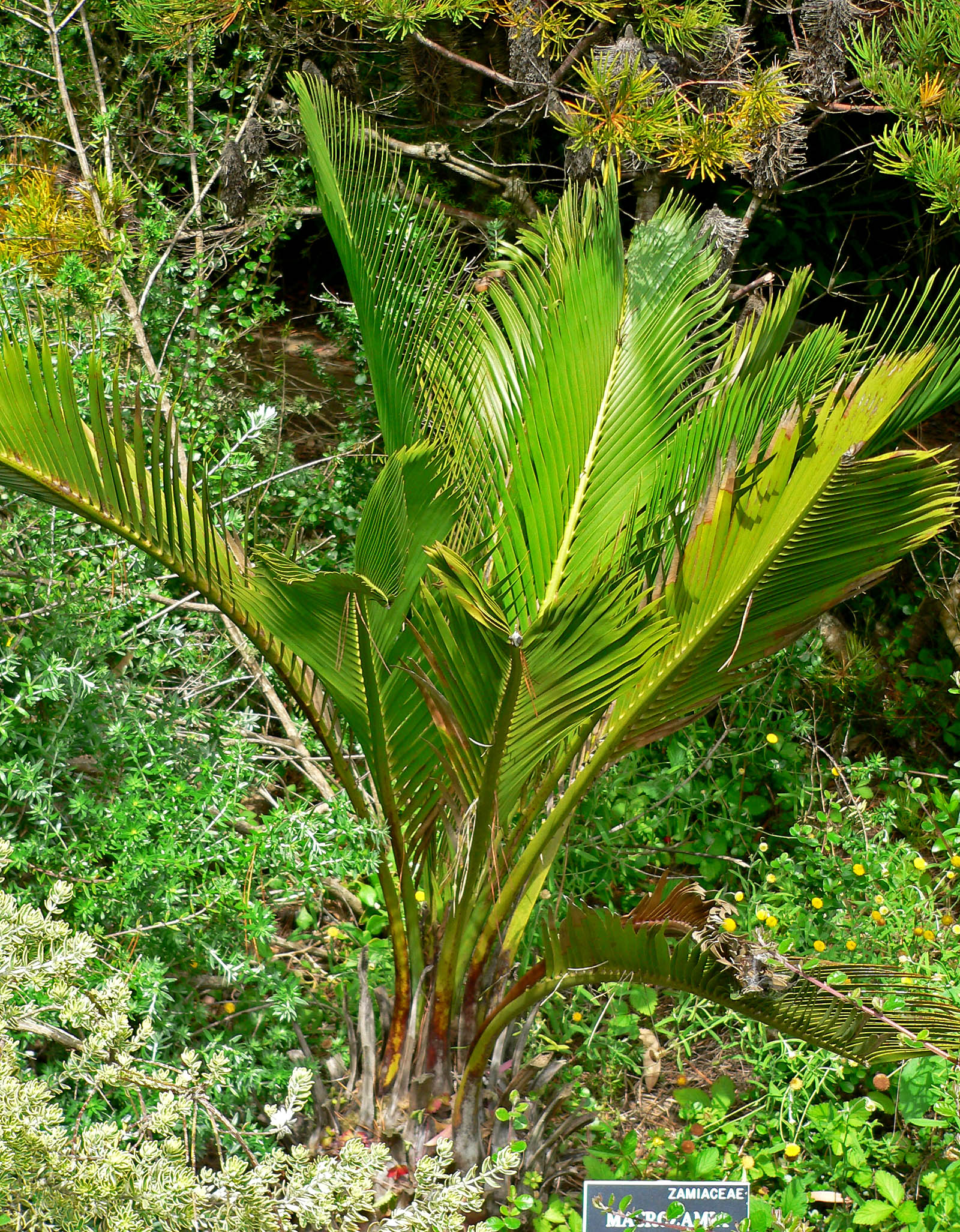

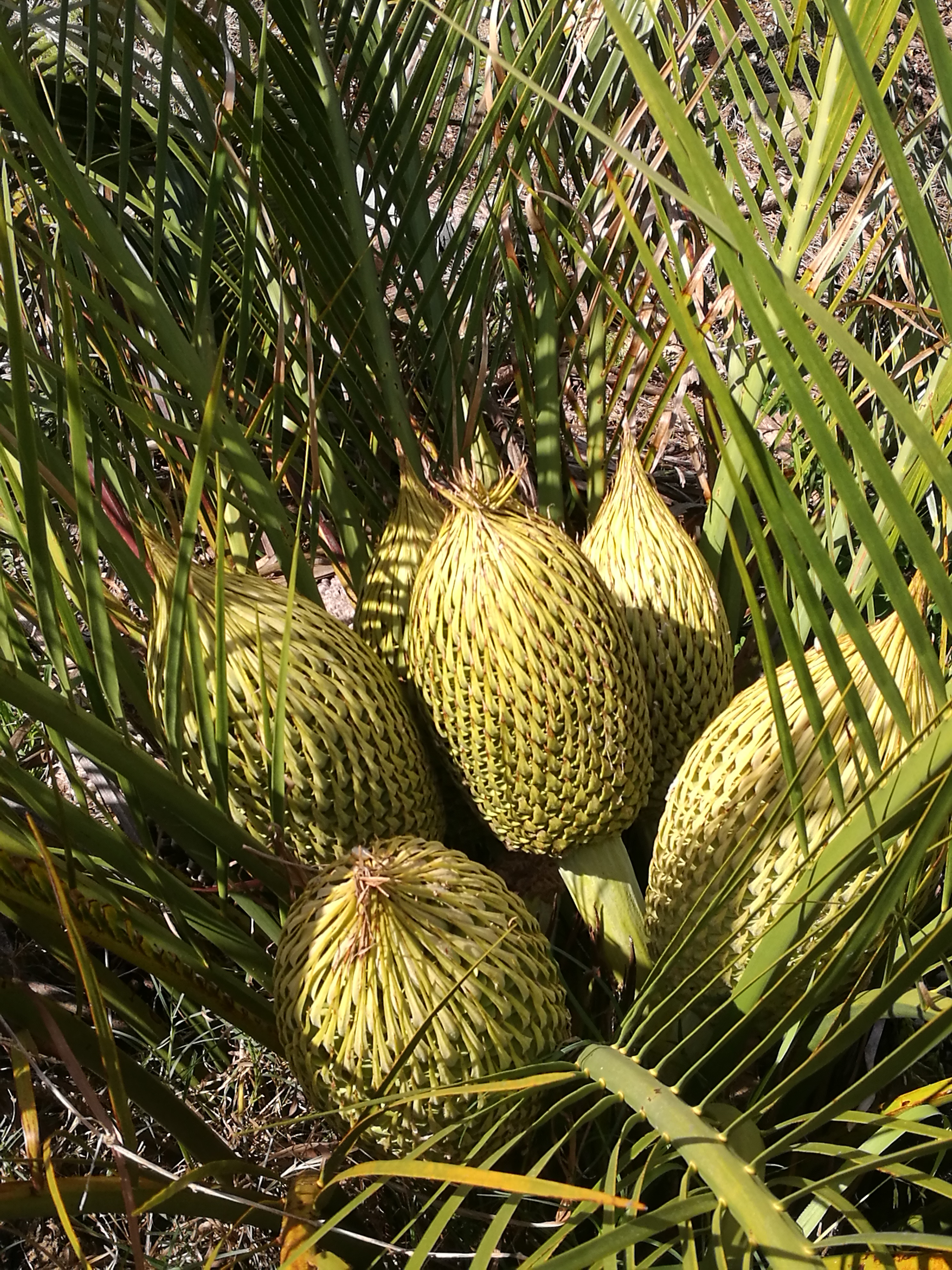

Conservation status
- Least Concern (IUCN 3.1)

Scientific classification
- Kingdom: Plantae
- Clade: Tracheophytes
- Clade: Gymnospermae
- Division: Cycadophyta
- Class: Cycadopsida
- Order: Cycadales
- Family: Zamiaceae
- Genus: Macrozamia
- Species: M. riedlei

Binomial name
- Macrozamia riedlei (Fisch. ex Gaudich.) C.A.Gardner
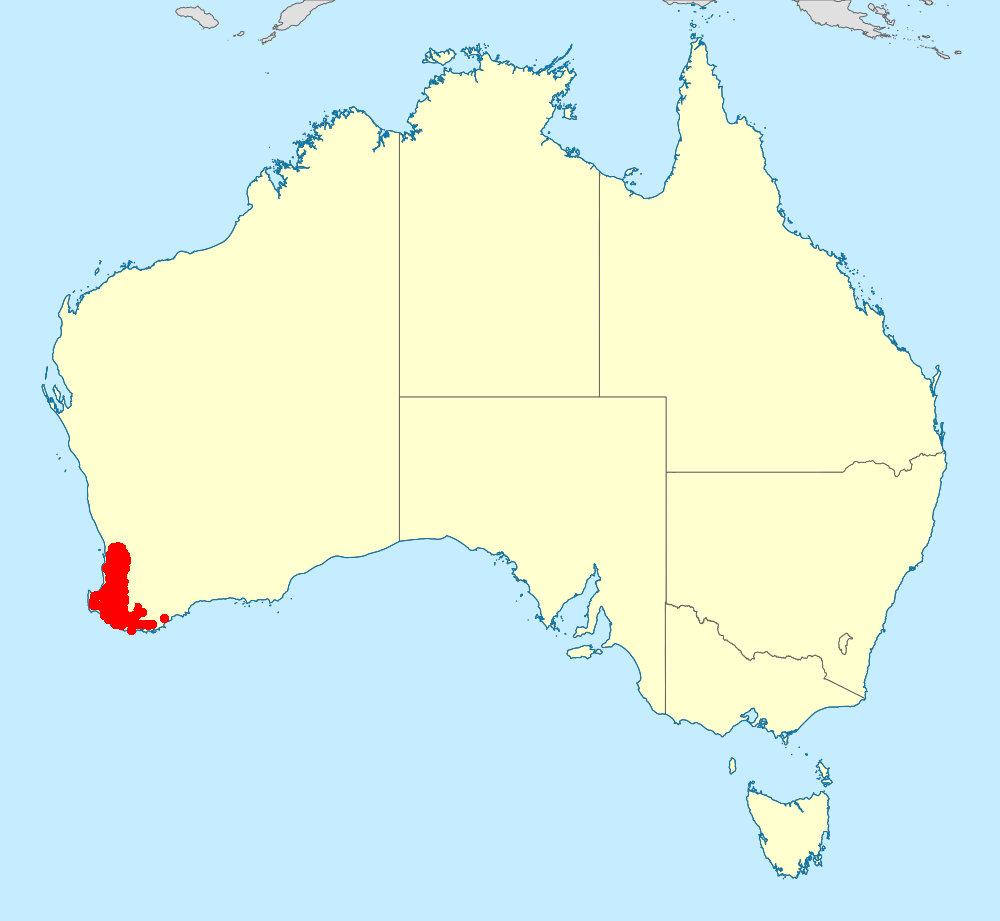
- approximate distribution map

Synonyms
- Cycas riedlei Fisch. ex Gaudich.

= Macrozamia riedlei =

Species of cycad

Macrozamia riedlei, commonly known as a zamia or zamia palm, is a species of cycad in the plant family Zamiaceae. It is endemic to southwest Australia and often occurs in jarrah forests. It may only attain a height of half a metre or form an above trunk up to two metres with long arching fronds of a similar length. The giant cones amidst the crown of palm-like fronds contain edible seeds surrounded by red sarcotesta. The seeds are consumed by birds and animals, and can be a favoured part of the human diet when prepared correctly. M. riedlei benefits from a close association with bacteria that fix nitrogen, which also produce substances found throughout the plant that are toxic to some animals when consumed. The species is cultivated for ornamental use in urban and domestic environments.

== Description ==
Macrozamia riedlei grows as a tree or trunkless low growing cycad (but is usually trunkless) attaining a height between 0.5–3.0 metres (1 ft 8 in – 9 ft 10 in). Between 12 and 30 glossy mid- to dark-green leaves emerge from its crown, each reaching 1.2 to 2.2 metres (3 ft 11 in to 7 ft 3 in) long and bearing 92–150 pinnae. The leaves are palm-like, each frond having a thickened mid-rib with the pinnae evenly arranged at either side. The flowering period occurs between September and October.

The dioecious genus is noted for the large size of the reproductive structure, and this species is remarkable in several of those aspects. The female cone measures 120–250 millimetres (4.7–9.8 in) wide and 250–500 millimetres (9.8–19.7 in) long, and the weight has been recorded up to 14 kilograms (31 lb); the eggs and spermatozoids are visible to the naked eye. The cones persist on the plant for many months, the smaller pollen-bearing cone remaining green and the larger female cone becoming prominently red. Spores are contained in small box-like structures on the underside of the leaf until ripe, a similar structure at the receptive cone is reduced to two seeds that remain attached to the leaf.

It differs from other West Australian macrozamias in that it is generally trunkless, smaller, has fewer and glossier flat leaves, and has smaller cones.

== Taxonomy ==
The first species description was published as Cycas riedlei by Friedrich Ernst Ludwig von Fischer, based on a specimen collected at King George Sound and held at the Paris museum. The species name honours French gardener Anselme Riedlé. An orthographic variant—M. reidlei— was used by the revising author, Charles Gardner, when assigning it to the genus Macrozamia and citing specimens obtained near Collie, Manjimup, Bow Bridge, and other sites south of Perth.

The colonists applied the term zamia and zamia palm to the once common plant, this continued to be given in some listings and guides. The names in the local language for the plant are baian, djiriji, koondagoor and quinning. Different names are applied to various parts of the plants and its products, most of which has had some application as food or material resource.

== Distribution ==
Occurring on lateritic soils, often in Jarrah forest, it is an endemic species of southern Western Australia. It is found from the southwestern coast east to Dwellingup and Albany. The species also occurs at the west of the Esperance Plains and on the Swan Coastal Plain.

== Ecology ==
The 'nuts' from this plant have been successfully used as food by Indigenous Australians after proper processing; however, when eaten by European explorers they incurred poisoning:

Reported cases of poisoning from this cycad are perhaps the earliest for any local plant. Macrozamia riedlei is mentioned as causing sickness in men eating the seeds by Vlamingh in 1697, La Perouse in 1788, Flinders in 1801, and Sir George Grey in 1839.

The Willem de Vlamingh incident, the earliest episode of a European poisoning themselves with an Australian plant, was recorded as an unsigned entry in the ship's journal, the officer being one of several who ventured to eat the seeds while exploring the Swan River area. Ingestion of the unprepared seed induced vomiting after several hours, that was described as putting those afflicted as so bilious there "was hardly any difference between us and death". The incident was further embellished in a second-hand report published in Amsterdam, portraying men incapacitated by involuntary movements.

The poisoning of the crew on the disastrous La Perouse expedition was noted by Governor Phillip as resulting in the same violent vomiting.

Some crew members of the circumnavigation expedition led by Matthew Flinders made a similar error, consuming the toxins of M. riedlei while anchored at the south coast. At the founding of the Swan River Colony in 1829 Captain Fremantle was the first to taste three of the 'ground nuts' found at a local camp-fire, describing the taste as inoffensive and similar to 'roast potato'. He awoke the next morning with the symptoms of poisoning and recovered later that day after taking tea as an emetic and a period of sleep. Charles Fremantle testily records that despite witnessing and being informed of the consequences of eating the same, many of the men and two officers did just that and some suffered severe reactions.

The misadventure of George Grey's party occurred 13 April 1839, while undertaking a journey to Perth after being shipwrecked on Gantheaume Bay at Kalbarri. The party was lightly supplied with rations and overlooked the harvest of food resources as they scrambled on their 300 km journey. They had been shown and fed a small amount of prepared seed, and later sought and found fresh seed. Not having been properly prepared, the meal temporarily debilitated them.

The species known as by-yu and djiriji was an important plant to the Noongar people once processed, the flesh around the seeds a staple food; this is comparable with the use of many cycads around the world. The stem also provides starch that was used by colonials as 'bush flour', a substitute for flour derived from introduced grains. Evarist (1979) notes that early settlers observed aboriginal practices and used the starch from the pith of the trunk (for food) "after drying, shredding, soaking in water for several hours, filtering, settling, washing several times, drying slowly and powdering. Aside from finding the foodstuff at Noongar camps, or offered it when hungry, early visitors and colonists recorded people harvesting the fruit. In 1832, the newcomer Henry Camfield noted the elder Midgegoroo and others gathering the nuts where he had settled at Burswood, Western Australia. The preparation of the seeds is a method known to the people as mordak, an excavation at a cave in Cape Le Grand national park of a nearly intact example was dated at thirteen thousand years old. The ripe and unprepared seed of M. riedlei is known as pauyin, this is able to be harvested toward the end of March, after the austral summer.

The informal names 'wobbles' and 'rickets' were used by the settlers, describing the effect on cattle allowed to graze on them. This affliction of the introduced mammal, the result of ingesting the leaves, began with paralysis of the rear quarters and resulted in their death, leading the settlers to attempt eradication of the species where they grazed. The toxins contained in the cone and other parts of the plant, macrozamin and cycasin, are produced in coralloid roots by nitrogen-fixing cyanobacteria.

The coralloid root system is a symbiosis of the cycad's roots and cyanobacteria of the genera Nostoc and Calothrix. In M. riedlei the nitrogen (N_{2}) capture is most active in wet seasons and nitrogen content is doubled within 8–11 years. Examination of the response to recent burns found the weight ratio of coralloid roots to the bole increased and the concentration of nitrogen at the roots was higher, suggesting nitrogen fixation met the need of rapid leaf regrowth that occurs after these events.

Avian and mammalian species are attracted to the reproductive cone structure, insects are involved in the pollination of the female plant. The birds include a western rosella subspecies (moyadong, Platycercus icterotis icterotis) which eat the fleshy part of the seed cone, other birds known to eat the seeds include the emu, common bronzewing pigeon (Phaps chalcoptera), white-tailed black cockatoo, and common species silvereye, grey butcherbird and raven (wodang; Corvus coronoides). Mammal species recorded at the plant are the western grey kangaroo (Macropus fuliginosus), western brush wallaby (Macropus irma), quokka (Setonix brachyurus), common brushtail possum (Trichosurus vulpecula) and western quoll (Dasyurus geoffroii).

The Catholic Church of Western Australia has substituted the fronds for those of palm trees on Palm Sunday. The ancient form of the plant inspired the poet Judith Wright to pen the lines,

Among the complicated birds and flowers

They seem a generation carved in stone. — Wright, J.

== Cultivation ==
Macrozamia riedlei has horticultural potential as a large container plant or specimen plant. It grows in well-drained soil and is sensitive to fungal attack. Large specimens can be transplanted. Seed germinates in 12 to 18 months.

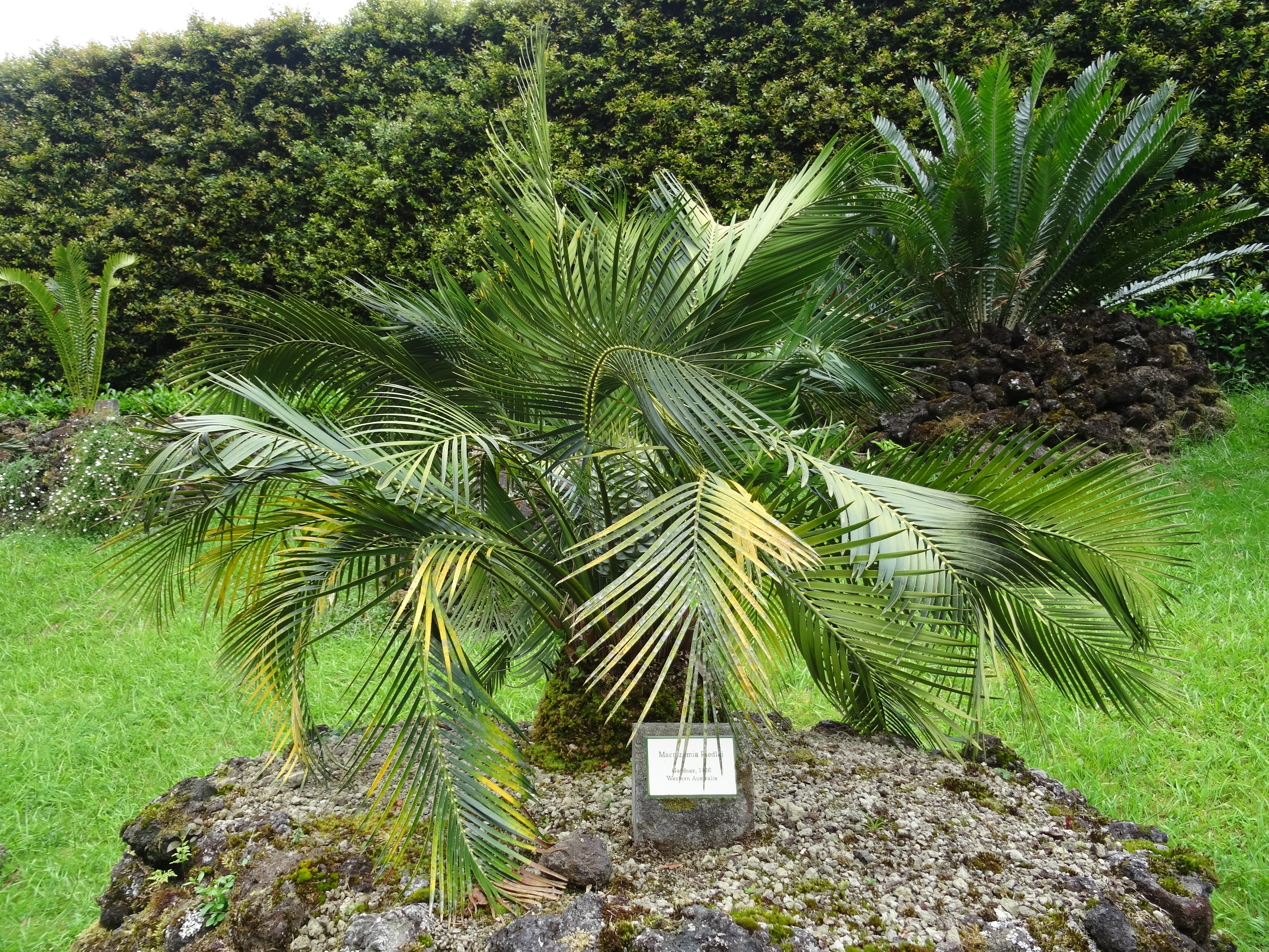
Cultivated specimen at Parque Terra Nostra in Furnas, on the island of São Miguel in the Azores

Most of the genus Macrozamia are cultivated and M. riedlei is one of the better known species. The plant is well suited to rockeries and containers (Wrigley & Fagg, 2003). The trunk may reach two metres in cultivation, the pinnate fronds, dark green and palm-like, also reach or exceed two metres as specimens advance in age. The urban garden plant resembles the size of those seen in the field, one or two metres in height, although they are slow growing in their native habitat; container planting tend to produce smaller sized specimens. They respond well to applications of a general fertiliser, and favour full sun or partial shade. They are a recommended indoor plant, being tolerant of low light and temperature, slow growing and able to remain in a container indefinitely.

The distribution of the zamia in the southwest has been correlated to sites of long term human habitation, close to lakes or springs, and freshwater points at granitic outcrops of the kwongan, although the intervention of other consumers, birds and mammals, complicates a postulate that inadvertent or intentional cultivation is the primary factor in seed dispersal. Animals species involved in dispersal of the plant include birds such as the emu and mammalian species Trichosurus vulpecula, a common possum known locally as quumarl. The fruiting cone begins to fully ripen and break apart during the local season bunuru, which occurs between February and March, and is ready to harvest.
