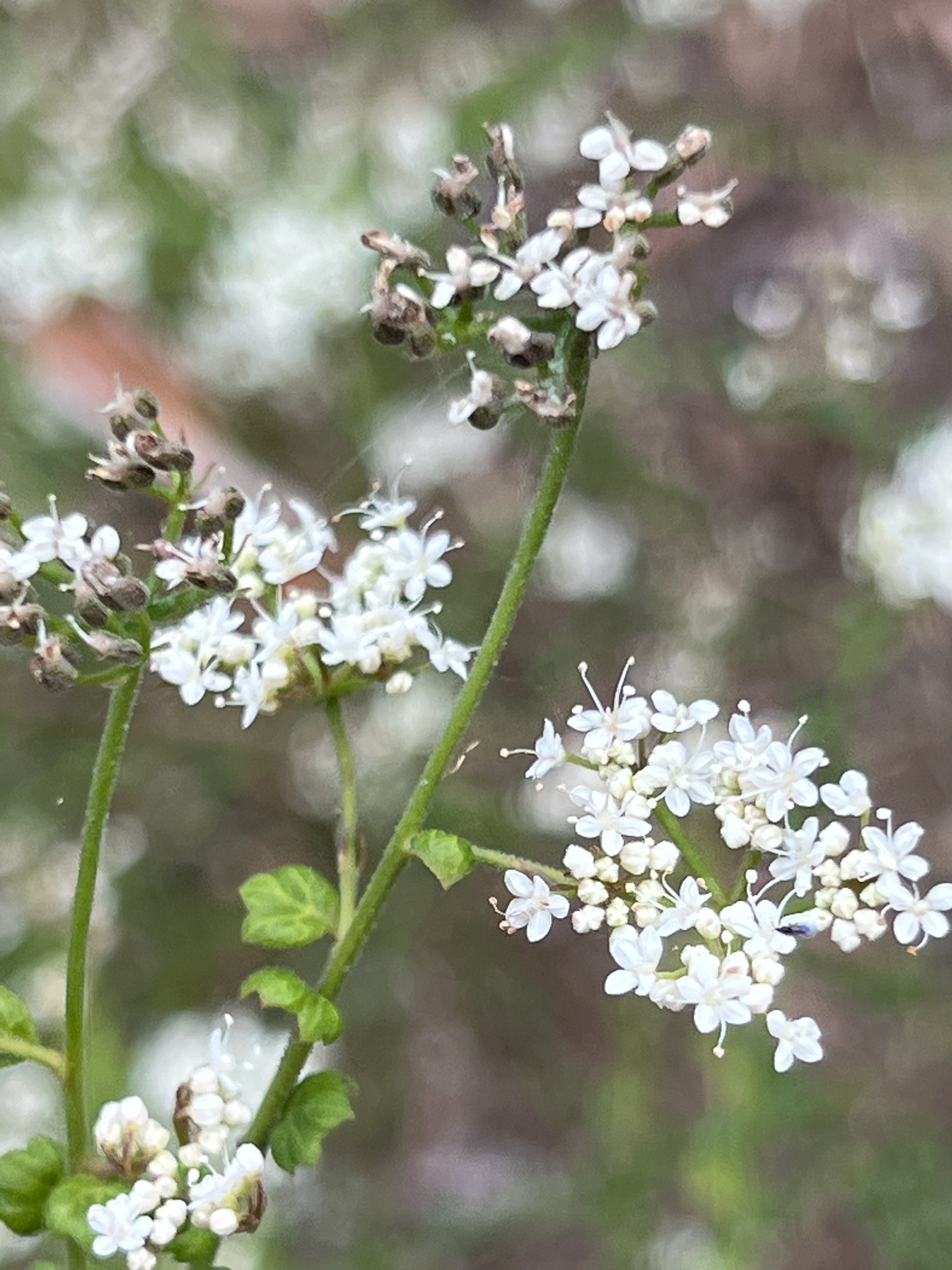

Scientific classification
- Kingdom: Plantae
- Clade: Tracheophytes
- Clade: Angiosperms
- Clade: Eudicots
- Clade: Asterids
- Order: Apiales
- Family: Apiaceae
- Genus: Platysace
- Species: P. clelandii

Binomial name
- Platysace clelandii L.A.S.Johnson

= Platysace clelandii =

Species of shrub

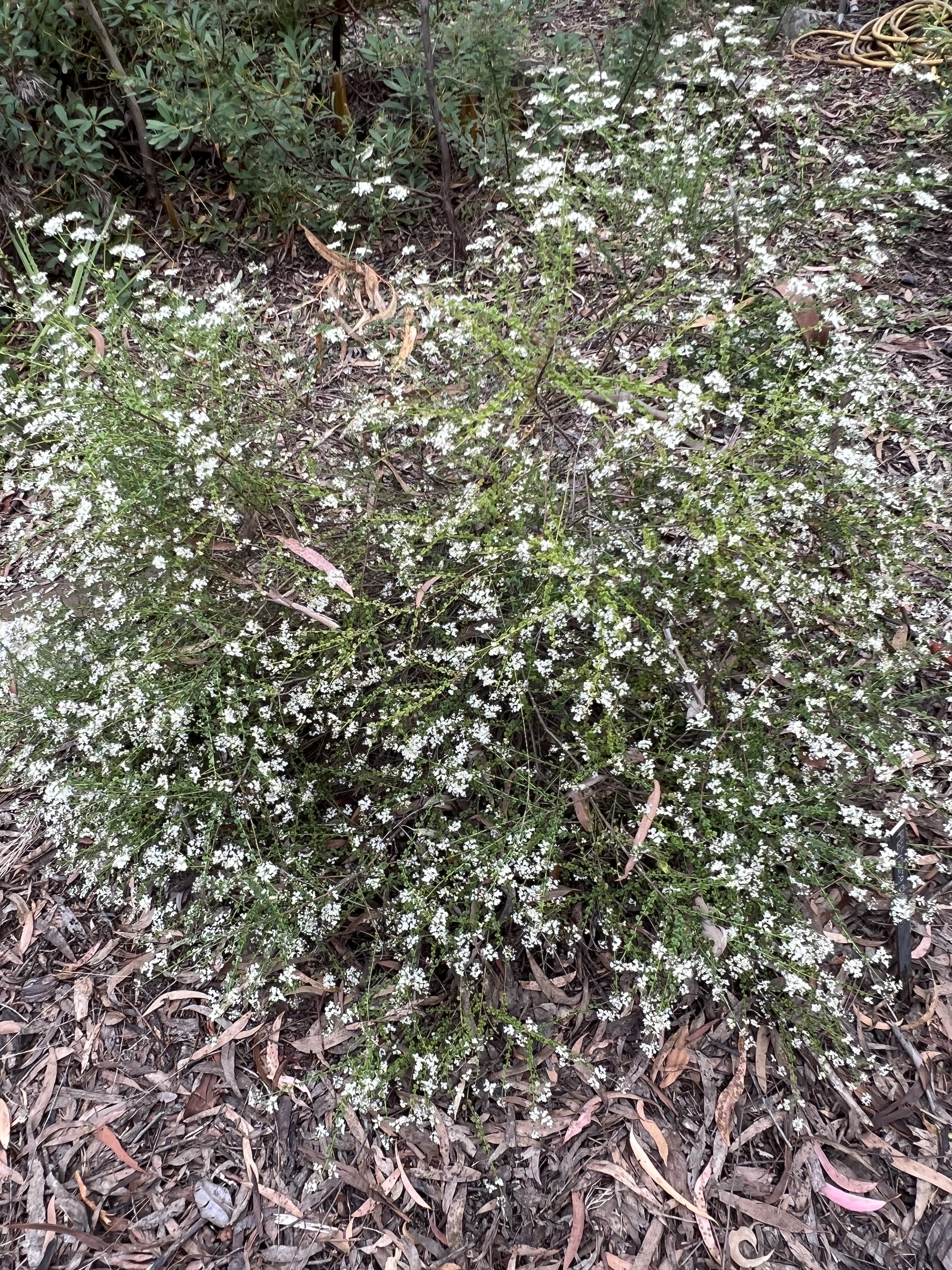
Habit

Platysace clelandii, is a flowering plant in the family Apiaceae and is endemic to New South Wales. It is small shrub with fan-shaped leaves and white flowers.

== Description ==
Platysace clelandii is a small, scrambling shrub to 30–60 cm (12–24 in) high and stems with long, upright, rigid hairs to soft, straight hairs. The leaves are fan-shaped, more or less circular to oval-shaped, usually 6–7 mm (0.24–0.28 in) long, up to 10 mm (0.39 in) wide, 3-5 lobes, base wedge-shaped, apex sharply toothed and on a petiole 1.5 mm (0.059 in) long. The white flowers are borne in umbels, 2–3 cm (0.79–1.18 in) in diameter, 4-6 rays and linear-shaped bracteoles up to 1.5 mm (0.059 in) long. Flowering occurs from August to February and the fruit about 1.5 mm (0.059 in) long, 2–2.2 mm (0.079–0.087 in) wide, slightly ribbed, wrinkled and sparingly covered in short bristles.

== Taxonomy and naming ==
In 1912 the species was named Trachymene clelandii by Joseph Maiden and Daniel Ludwig Ernst Betche. In 1962 Lawrence Alexander Sidney Johnson changed the name to Platysace clelandii and the description was published in Contributions from the New South Wales National Herbarium. The specific epithet (clelandii) honours John Burton Cleland collector of the type specimen.

== Distribution and habitat ==
Platysace clelandii grows in open, dry forests and hillsides amongst sandstone rocks from Glen Davis to Berowra.
