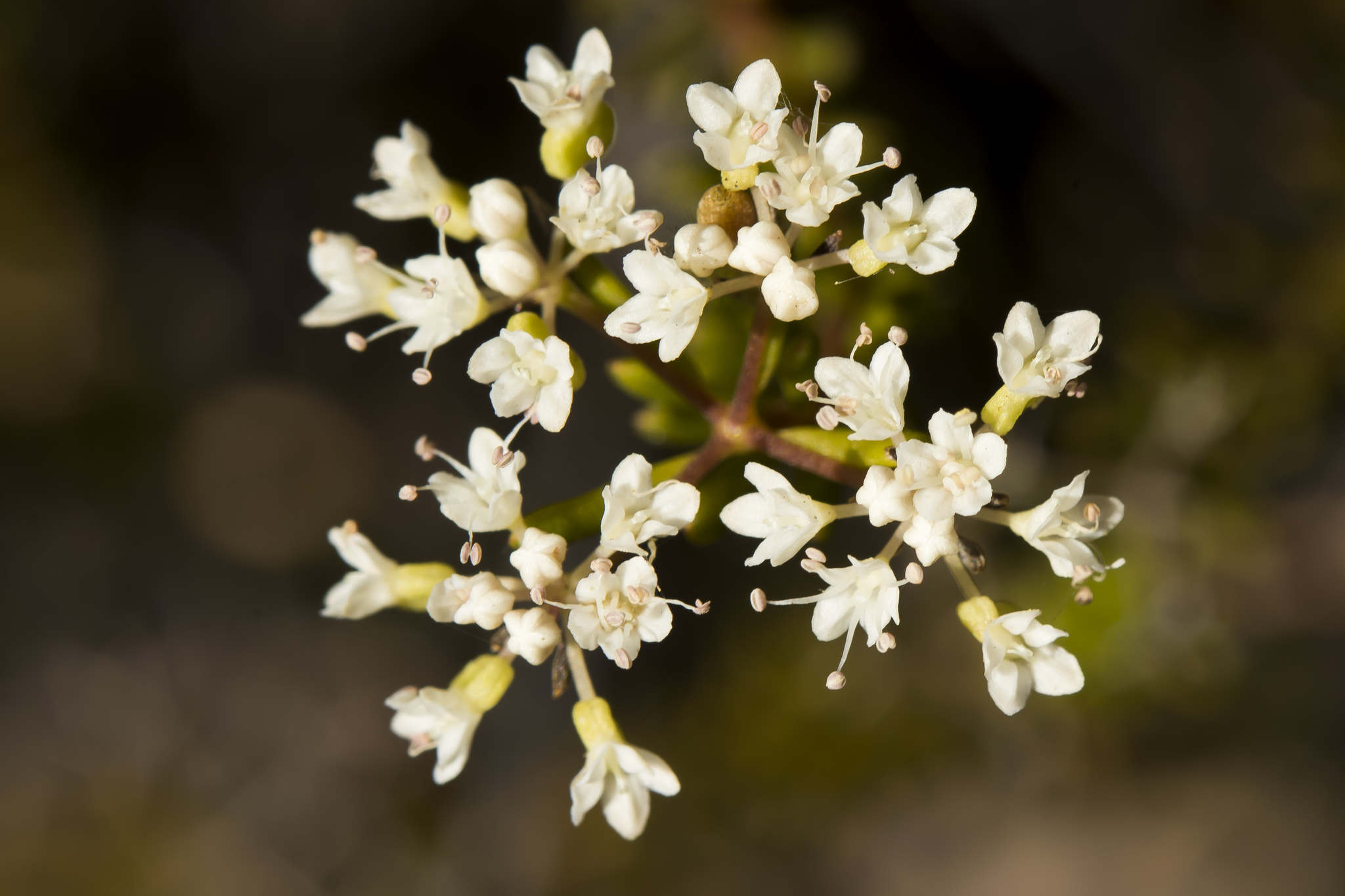
- Near Porongurup

Scientific classification
- Kingdom: Plantae
- Clade: Tracheophytes
- Clade: Angiosperms
- Clade: Eudicots
- Clade: Asterids
- Order: Apiales
- Family: Apiaceae
- Genus: Platysace
- Species: P. commutata

Binomial name
- Platysace commutata (Turcz.) C.Norman

Synonyms
- Siebera commutata (Turcz.) Benth.; Trachymene commutata Turcz.

= Platysace commutata =

Species of shrub

Platysace commutata is a shrub that is endemic to the south-west of Western Australia. It has linear leaves and white to cream-coloured or blue flowers.

== Description ==
Platysace commutata is a heath-like shrub with rod-like branches that typically grows to a height of 10–50 cm (3.9–19.7 in). Its leaves are linear, sometimes crowded, about 4–8.5 mm (0.16–0.33 in) long and often slightly twisted. The flowers are borne in umbels on a peduncle shorter than the end leaves. The 2 or 3 involucral bracts are similar to the stem leaves. Flowering occurs between October and December or from January to April and the fruit is spherical, nearly 2 mm (0.079 in) in diameter.

== Taxonomy ==
This species was first formally described in 1849 by Nikolai Turczaninow who gave it the name Trachymene commutata in the Bulletin de la Société Impériale des Naturalistes de Moscou, from specimens collected near the Swan River by James Drummond. In 1939, Cecil Norman transferred the species to the genus Platysace as P. commutata in the Journal of Botany, British and Foreign. The specific epithet (commutata) means "changed" or "altered", referring to the variable leaf forms.

== Distribution and habitat ==
Often found among quartzite rocks on hilltops and summits, P. commutata is distributed widely but with a scattered population in the Avon Wheatbelt, Esperance Plains, Geraldton Sandplains, Jarrah Forest and Mallee bioregions of south-western Western Australia.

== Conservation status ==
Platysace commutata is listed as "not threatened" by the Western Australian Government Department of Biodiversity, Conservation and Attractions.
