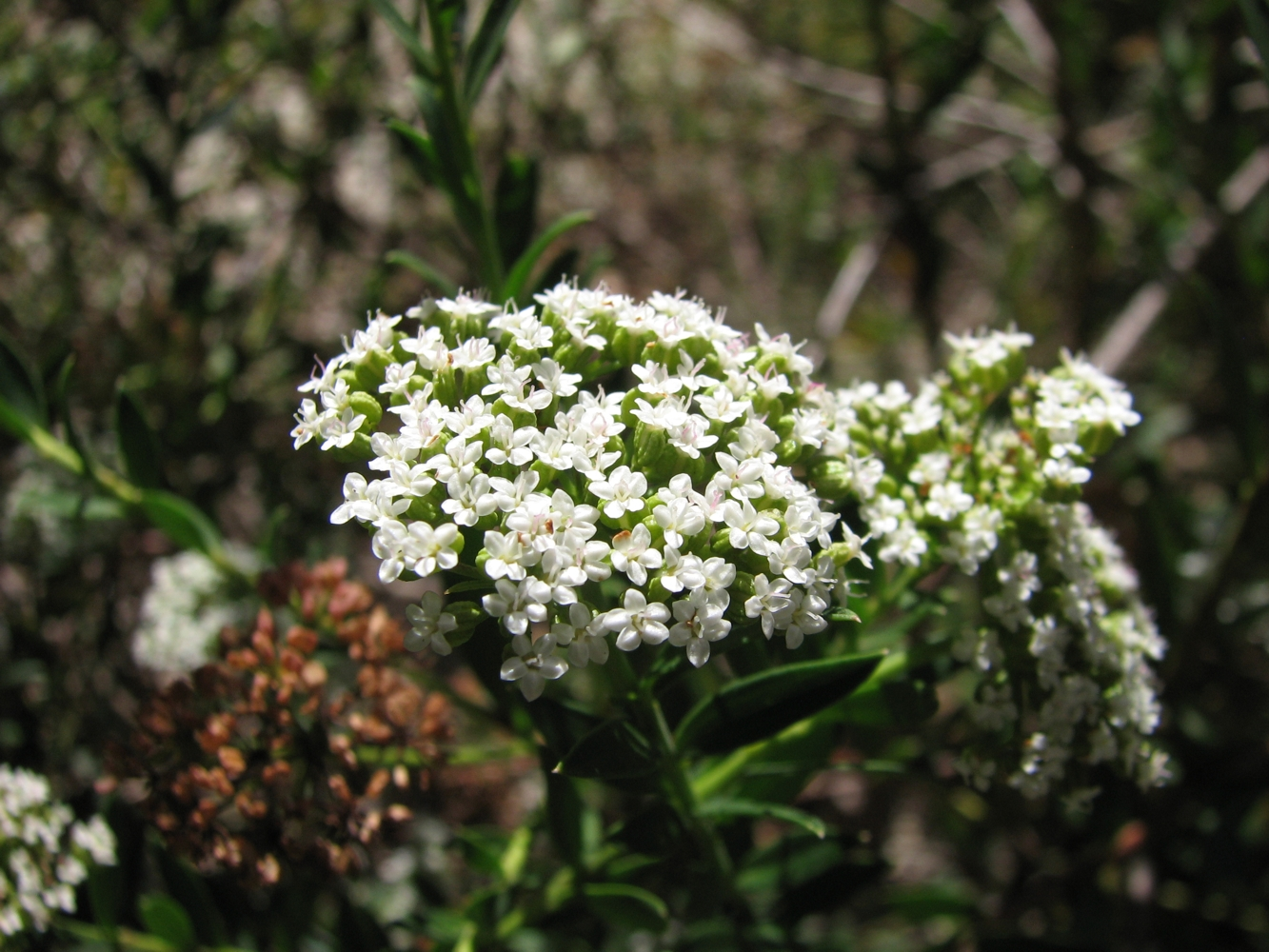
- Platysace lanceolata

Scientific classification
- Kingdom: Plantae
- Clade: Tracheophytes
- Clade: Angiosperms
- Clade: Eudicots
- Clade: Asterids
- Order: Apiales
- Family: Apiaceae
- Genus: Platysace; Bunge

Species
- See text.

Synonyms
- Hydrocotyle sect. Siebera Kuntze; Platycarpidium F.Muell.; Platysace sect. Euplatysace C.Norman nom. inval.; Platysace sect. Platymene (DC.) C.Norman; Siebera Rchb. nom. illeg., nom. superfl.; Trachymene sect. Platymene DC.

= Platysace =

Family of shrubs

Platysace is a genus of about 22 species of woody perennial herbs, shrubs and subshrubs in the family Apiaceae, and is endemic to Australia. The flowers are borne on the ends of branches in a compound umbel and are bisexual or male with white, cream-coloured or pinkish flowers.

== Description ==
Plants in the genus Platysace are woody perennial herbs, shrubs or subshrubs and have simple or lobed leaves. The flowers are borne on the ends of branches in a compound umbel with small bracts and bracteoles but that sometimes fall off as the flowers open. The flowers are bisexual or male, sometimes without sepals, and have white, cream-coloured or pinkish, elliptical to egg-shaped petals. The fruit has 2 compressed mericarps.

== Taxonomy ==
The genus Platysace was first described in 1845 by Alexander von Bunge in Lehmann's Plantae Preissianae, and the first species he described (the type species) was Platysace cirrosa.

A 2021 molecular phylogenetic study suggested that it is sister to rest of the family Apiaceae, and so does not belong to any of the four subfamilies into which the family is divided. It has been suggested that it could be placed in a subfamily of its own.

=== Species ===
The following is a list of species accepted by the Australian Plant Census as at March 2024:

- Platysace arnhemica Specht
- Platysace cirrosa Bunge – karna (W.A.)
- Platysace clelandii (Maiden & Betche) L.A.S.Johnson (N.S.W.)
- Platysace commutata (Turcz.) C.Norman (W.A.)
- Platysace compressa (Labill.) C.Norman (tapeworm plant) (W.A.)
- Platysace deflexa (Turcz.) C.Norman (W.A.)
- Platysace effusa (Turz.) C.Norman (W.A.)
- Platysace ericoides (Sieber ex Spreng.) C.Norman (Qld., N.S.W., Vic.)
- Platysace filiformis (Bunge) C.Norman (W.A.)
- Platysace haplosciadia (Benth.) C.Norman
- Platysace heterophylla (Benth.) C.Norman
  - Platysace heterophylla (Benth.) C.Norman var. heterophylla
  - Platysace heterophylla var. tepperi (J.M.Black) H.Eichler
- Platysace juncea (Bunge) C.Norman
- Platysace lanceolata (Labill.) Druce (shrubby platysace)
- Platysace linearifolia (Cav.) C.Norman
- Platysace maxwellii (F.Muell.) C.Norman (karno)
- Platysace pendula (Benth.) C.Norman
- Platysace ramosissima (Benth.) C.Norman
- Platysace saxatilis Keighery
- Platysace stephensonii (Turcz.) C.Norman
- Platysace trachymenioides F.Muell.
- Platysace valida (F.Muell.) F.Muell.
- Platysace xerophila (E.Pritz.) L.A.S.Johnson
