= Platysace cirrosa =

Scientific classification
- Kingdom: Plantae
- Clade: Tracheophytes
- Clade: Angiosperms
- Clade: Eudicots
- Clade: Asterids
- Order: Apiales
- Family: Apiaceae
- Genus: Platysace
- Species: P. cirrosa

Binomial name
- Platysace cirrosa Bunge

Species of herb

Platysace cirrosa, commonly known as karna, is a twining, perennial herb or climber that is endemic to the south-west of Western Australia. The Noongar name for the plant is kanna. It is leafless, sometimes with a few very small scale-like leaves, and flowers arranged in umbels with overlapping yellow petals and flattened fruit.

== Description ==
Platysace cirrosa is a twining, tuberous, perennial herb or climber, that is usually leafless or with very small, tapering scale-like leaves. The flowers are arranged on the ends of branches in compound umbels with a few small, narrow involucral bracts and blunt, yellow, overlapping petals. Flowering occurs between January and March and the fruit is flattened, about 6.5 mm (0.26 in) wide and 5.4 mm (0.21 in) long.

== Taxonomy ==
Platysace cirrosa was first formally described in 1845 by Alexander Andrejewitsch von Bunge in Lehmann's Plantae Preissianae. The specific epithet (fruticulosa) means "bearing tendrils".

== Distribution and habitat ==
This platysace is found along slopes and drainage lines in the Avon Wheatbelt, Geraldton Sandplains, Jarrah Forest and Yalgoo bioregions of south-western Western Australia where it grows in lateritic or loamy soils over granite.

== Conservation status ==
Platysace cirrosa is listed as "not threatened" by the Western Australian Government Department of Biodiversity, Conservation and Attractions.
