= Pterostylis commutata =

Midland rustyhood

Conservation status
- Critically endangered (EPBC Act)

Scientific classification
- Kingdom: Plantae
- Clade: Tracheophytes
- Clade: Angiosperms
- Clade: Monocots
- Order: Asparagales
- Family: Orchidaceae
- Subfamily: Orchidoideae
- Tribe: Cranichideae
- Genus: Pterostylis
- Species: P. commutata

Binomial name
- Pterostylis commutata D.L.Jones

Synonyms
- Oligochaetochilus commutatus (D.L.Jones & M.A.Clem.) D.L.Jones & M.A.Clem.

Species of orchid

Pterostylis commutata, commonly known as the midland rustyhood is a plant in the orchid family Orchidaceae and is endemic to Tasmania. It has a rosette of leaves near its base and up to five translucent white and green flowers with a hairy, insect-like labellum. It is only found in a small area near Tunbridge and Ross .

== Description ==
Pterostylis commutata is a terrestrial, perennial, deciduous, herb with an underground tuber and a rosette of between six and ten leaves. Each leaf is 15–30 mm (0.6–1 in) long and 4–8 mm (0.2–0.3 in) wide. Flowering plants have a rosette at the base of the flowering stem but these are usually withered by flowering time. Up to five translucent white flowers with green markings and 45–55 mm (1.8–2.2 in) long and 7–9 mm (0.3–0.4 in) wide are borne on a flowering spike 100–250 mm (4–10 in) tall. The flowers lean forward slightly and there are three or four stem leaves wrapped around the flowering stem. The dorsal sepal and petals form a hood called the "galea" over the column with the dorsal sepal having a thread-like tip 15–20 mm (0.6–0.8 in) long. The lateral sepals are the same width as the galea, dished and have densely hairy edges. They taper suddenly to narrow, thread-like tips 15–30 mm (0.6–1 in) long and parallel to each other. The labellum is green or brown, thin and insect-like, 6–7 mm (0.2–0.3 in) long and about 4 mm (0.2 in) wide. The edges of the labellum are wavy, with short, bristly hairs and there are two longer bristles near the "head" end. Flowering occurs from December to January.

== Taxonomy and naming ==
Pterostylis commutata was first formally described in 1993 by David Jones from a specimen collected near Ross and the description was published in Muelleria. The specific epithet (commutata) is derived from the Latin word commutatus, 'changed', referring to the divergence of this species following isolation from related species.

== Distribution and habitat ==
The midlands rustyhood grows in grassy woodland near Tunbridge and Ross.

== Conservation ==
Pterostylis commutata is listed as "critically endangered" under the (CR) under the Environment Protection and Biodiversity Conservation Act 1999 (EPBC Act) and as "endangered" under the Tasmanian Government Threatened Species Protection Act 1995. It is only known form an area of about 75 km^{2} (30 sq mi) and the largest of the five populations only contains seventeen plants. The main threats to the species' survival include agricultural activities, habitat alteration and weed invasion.
