= Capertee National Park =

National park in Australia

Coordinates: 33°02′35″S 150°01′20″E

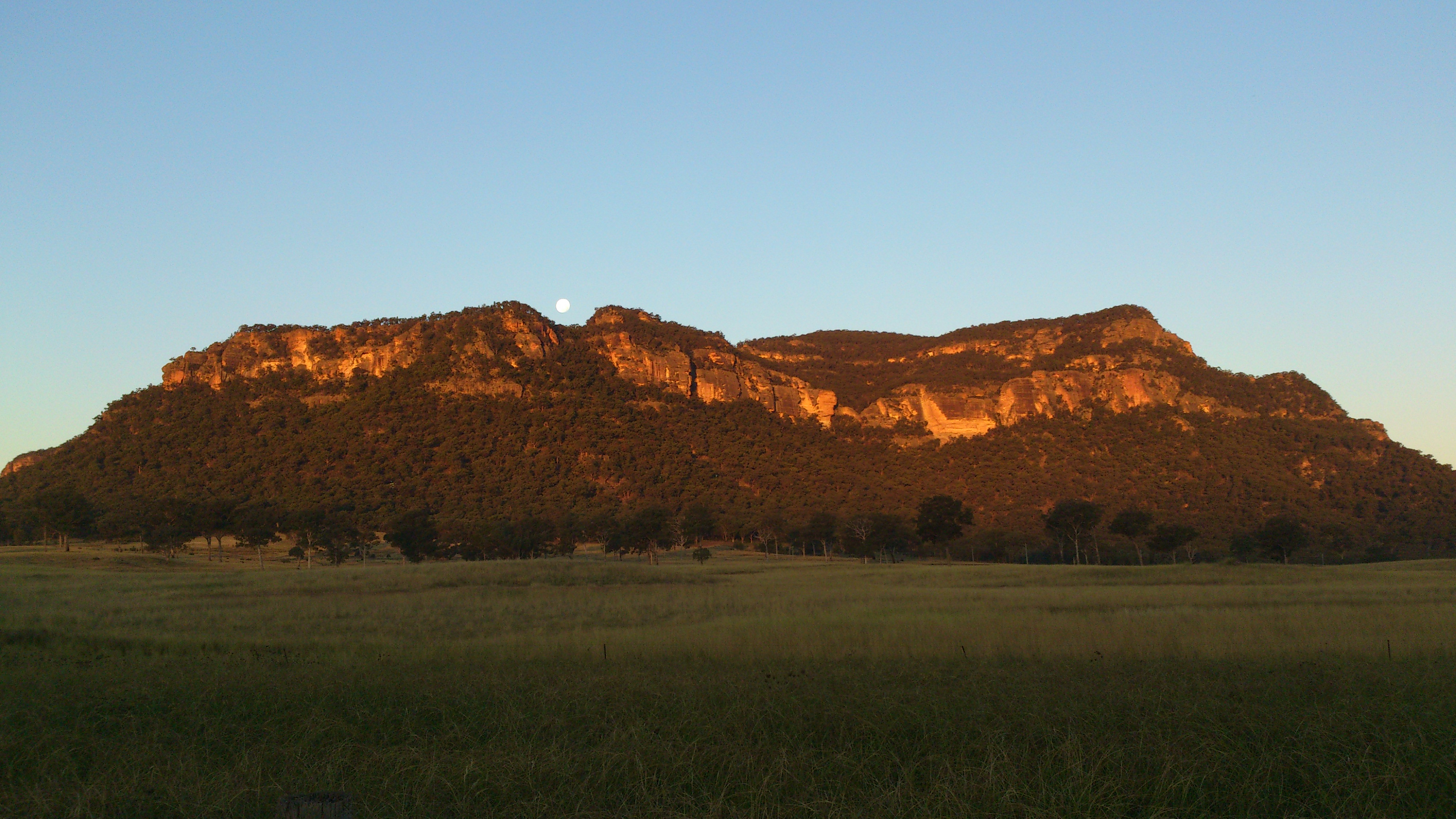
Capertee Valley

Capertee National Park is located approximately 115 kilometres north of Lithgow in the Central West region of the state of New South Wales, Australia. It is within the traditional Country of the Wiradjuri People.

== Description ==
The park is 6,796 hectares in area. It is part of a network of protected areas that includes Mugii Murum-ban State Conservation Area, Wollemi National Park, Gardens of Stone National Park and Gardens of Stone State Conservation Area.

The park was previously a mix of freehold and leasehold land associated with the property known as Port Macquarie. The additions made in 2015 and 2016 were Crown land. The addition made in 2020 was a freehold property known as Glenolan. Reservation date 2010: Capertee National Park was reserved in 2010, and additions were made in 2015, 2016 and 2020.

The Capertee Valley is geologically diverse, contributing to a diversity of vegetation communities, including 11 which are protected in the park. This includes the critically endangered White Box – Yellow Box – Blakely's Red Gum Woodland.

The park protects the habitats of 32 threatened animal species. Woodland communities provide habitat for threatened woodland bird species, including the critically endangered regent honeyeater, gang-gang cockatoo, diamond firetail and hooded robin. These species are in severe decline due to clearing, habitat fragmentation, reduced food sources and loss of hollow-bearing trees.
