= Journal of Botany, British and Foreign =

Scholarly journal

Journal of Botany, British and Foreign is a monthly journal that was published from 1863 to 1942, and founded by Berthold Carl Seemann who was the editor until his death in 1871. It was initially published by Robert Hardwicke. Seemann himself took on most of the financial responsibility for the journal, which was never profitable, although he was assisted by various other botanists. He was succeeded as editor by Henry Trimen an employee of the British Museum, who also probably took on the expense of running it. Trimen resigned as editor on being appointed director of the Royal Botanical Gardens in Ceylon in 1879, and was succeeded by James Britten, another employee of the British Museum, who continued in the post for 45 years.

== Bibliography ==
- "Biodiversity Heritage Library". Journal of Botany, British and Foreign. 1863–1942. (1863–1922)
- "Botanical Society of Britain & Ireland". Journal of Botany, British and Foreign. 1863–1942. (1834–1940: selected vols.)
