= Oil shale in Estonia =

Overview of the industry in Estonia

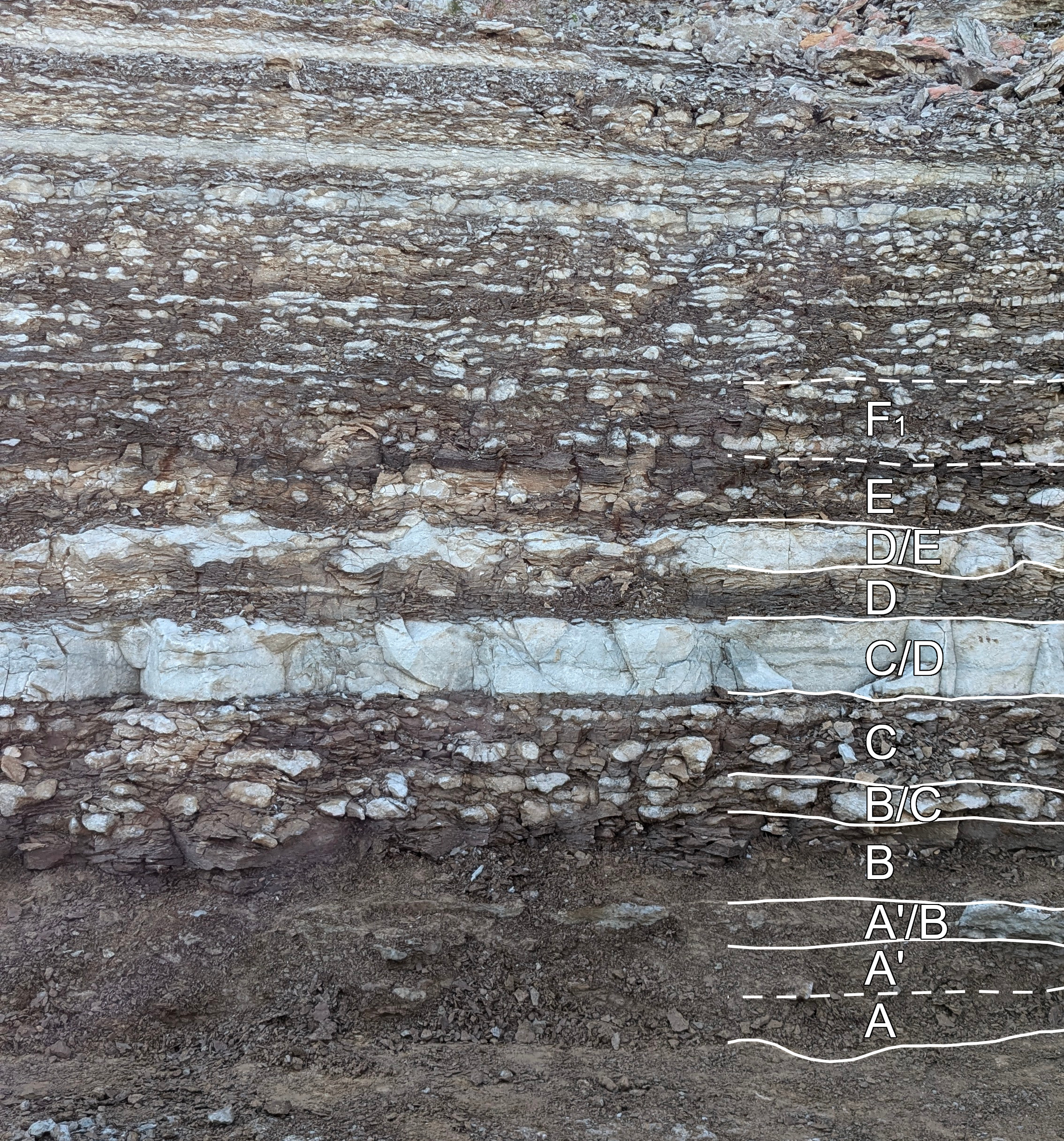
Outcrop of Ordovician kukersite oil shale, northern Estonia

There are two kinds of oil shale in Estonia, both of which are sedimentary rocks laid down during the Ordovician geologic period. Graptolitic argillite is the larger oil shale resource, but, because its organic matter content is relatively low, it is not used industrially. The other is kukersite, which has been mined for more than a hundred years. Kukersite deposits in Estonia account for 1% of global oil shale deposits.

Oil shale (Estonian: põlevkivi; literally 'burning rock') has been defined as a strategic energy resource in Estonia and the oil shale industry in Estonia is one of the most developed in the world. Historically, most of mined oil shale was used for electricity generation. Of all the oil shale fired power stations in the world, the two largest are in Estonia. Although its share decreased in the decade to 2022, direct and indirect use of oil shale still generates about half of Estonia's electricity. About half of mined oil shale is used to produce shale oil, a type of synthetic oil extracted from oil shale by pyrolysis, which is sufficient to keep Estonia as the second largest shale oil producer in the world after China. In addition, oil shale and its products are used in Estonia for district heating and as a feedstock material for the cement industry.

In the 18th and 19th centuries, Estonian oil shale was described by several scientists and used as a low-grade fuel. Its use in industry commenced in 1916. Production of shale oil began in 1921 and oil shale was first used to generate electrical power in 1924. Shortly thereafter, systematic research into oil shale and its products began, and in 1938 a department of mining was established at Tallinn Technical University. After World War II, Estonian oil shale gas was used in Saint Petersburg (then called Leningrad) and in northern cities in Estonia as a substitute for natural gas. Increased need for electricity in the north-west of the Soviet Union led to the construction of large oil shale-fired power stations. Oil shale extraction peaked in 1980. Subsequently, the launch of nuclear reactors in Russia, particularly the Leningrad Nuclear Power Station, reduced demand for electricity produced from oil shale, and, along with a post-Soviet restructuring of the industry in the 1990s, led to a decrease in oil shale mining. After decreasing for two decades, oil shale mining started to increase again at the beginning of the 21st century. Most oil-shale fuelled electricity generation is planned to be phased out by 2030.

The industry continues to have a serious impact on the environment producing ordinary and hazardous waste and greenhouse gas emissions, lowering groundwater levels, altering water circulation, and spoiling water quality. Leachates from waste heaps pollute surface and groundwater. Former and current oil shale mines cover about one percent of Estonia's territory.

== Resource ==
=== Graptolitic argillite ===
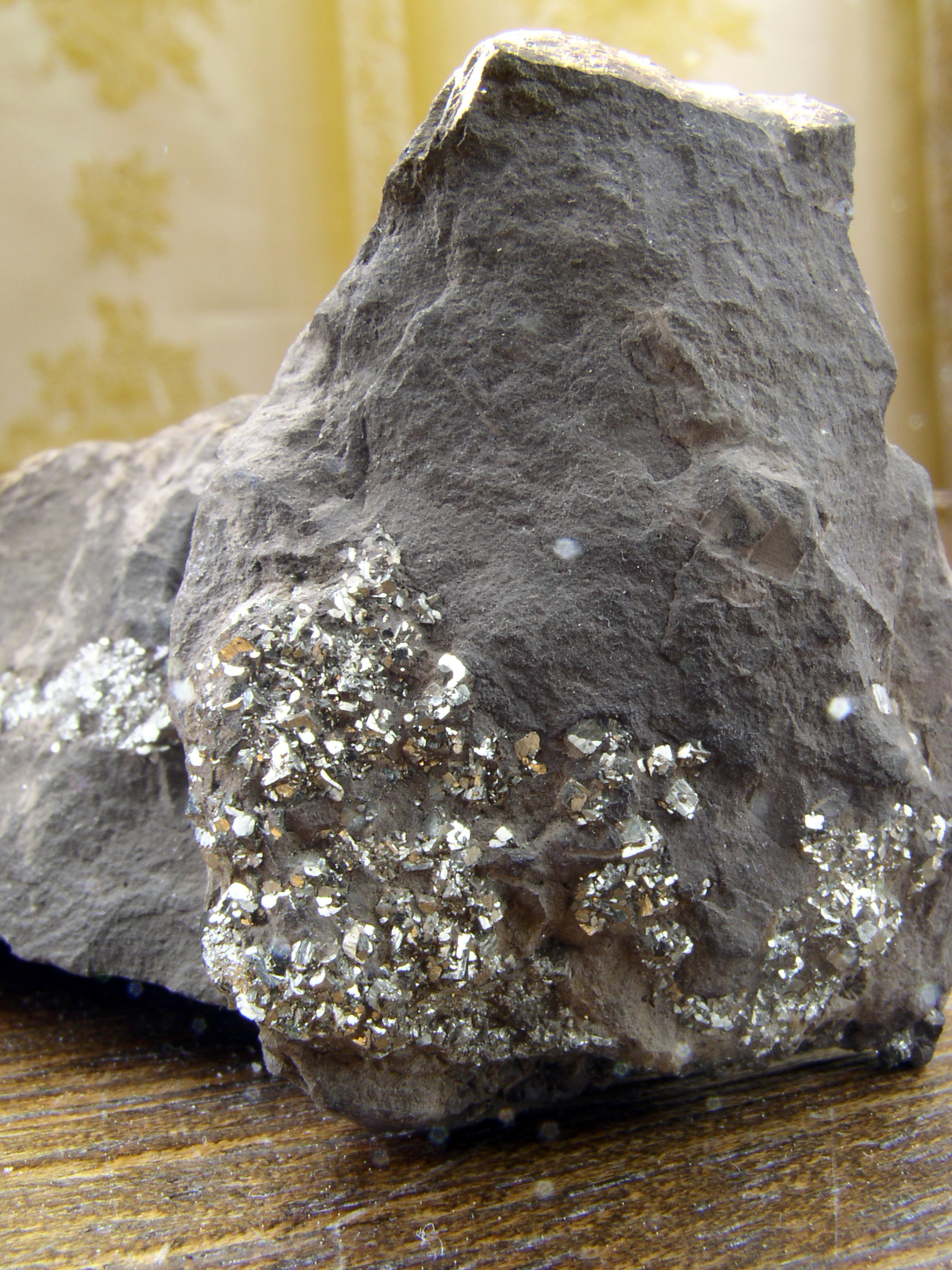
A specimen of graptolite argillite containing pyrite (FeS_{2}) from the Türisalu cliff, an outcrop of the Türisalu Formation

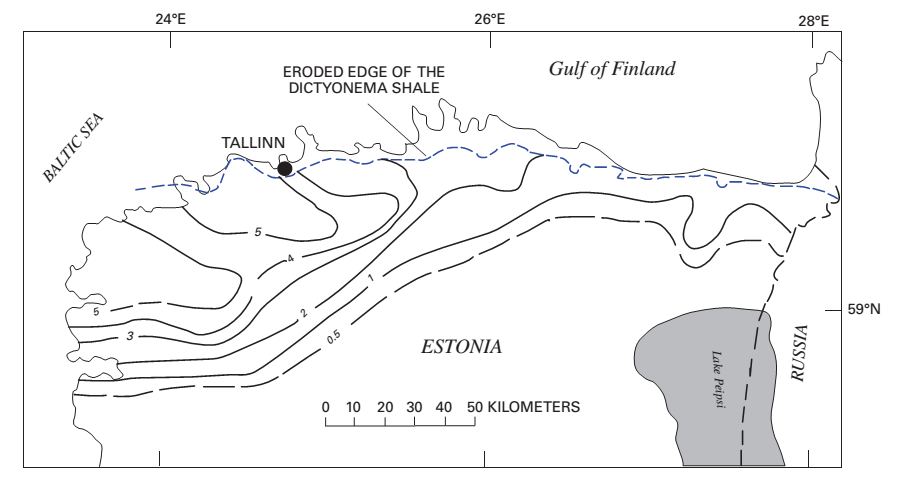
An isopach map of the Ordovician graptolitic argillite deposits in northern Estonia, indicating thickness in meters

Estonian graptolitic argillite (also known as dictyonema argillite, dictyonema oil shale, dictyonema shale or alum shale) is a marine-type of black shale, belonging to the marinite-type of oil shales. Although the name dictyonema argillite is widely used instead of graptolitic argillite, it is now considered a misnomer as the graptolite fossils in the rock, earlier considered dictyonemids, were reclassified during the 1980s as members of the genus Rhabdinopora.

Graptolitic argillite was formed some 480 million years ago during the Early Ordovician under a marine environment. In mainland Estonia, it occurs at the foot of the North Estonian Klint, ranging from the Pakri Peninsula to Narva in an area covering about 11,000 square kilometres (4,200 sq mi). When findings in the western Estonian islands are included, its extent increases to about 12,200 square kilometres (4,700 sq mi). The thickness of the layer varies from less than 0.5 metres (1 ft 8 in) to a maximum of 8 metres (26 ft) in western Estonia, and its depth below the surface varies from 10 to 90 metres (33 to 295 ft).

Resources of graptolitic argillite in Estonia have been estimated at 60–70 billion tonnes. Although resources of graptolitic argillite exceed that of kukersite, attempts to use it as an energy source have been unsuccessful due to its low calorific value and high sulfur content. Its organic content ranges from 10 to 20% and its sulfur content from 2 to 4%. Correspondingly, its calorific value is only 5–8 megajoules per kilogram (MJ/kg; 1,200–1,900 kcal/kg) and its Fischer Assay oil yield is 3–5%. However, the graptolitic argillite resource in Estonia contains a potential 2.1 billion tonnes of oil. In addition, it contains 5.67 million tonnes of uranium – making it one of the main potential sources of uranium in Europe – 16.53 million tonnes of zinc, and 12.76 million tonnes of molybdenum. There is as yet no economical and environmentally friendly technology to extract either the metals or the oil.

=== Kukersite ===
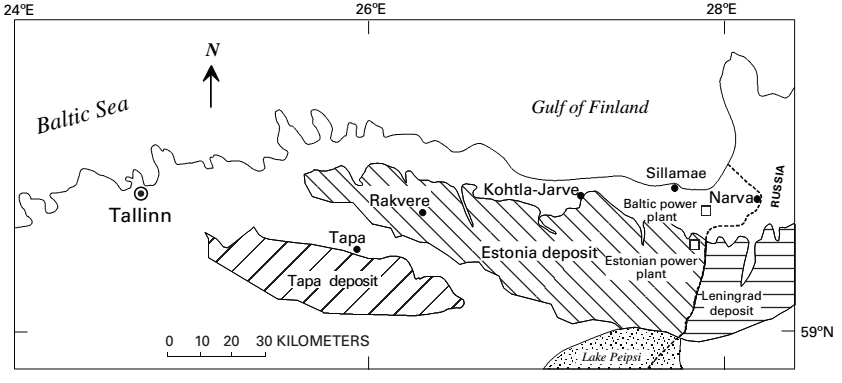
Location of kukersite deposits within the Baltic Oil Shale Basin in northern Estonia and Russia

Kukersite is a light-brown marine-type Late Ordovician oil shale formed some 460 million years ago. It was named kuckers by the Baltic German geologist Carl Friedrich Schmidt in the mid-19th century, and kukersite by the Russian paleobotanist Mikhail Zalessky in 1916. The name reflects the German name for Kukruse Manor, where oil shale samples were obtained.

Kukersite deposits in Estonia are the world's second highest-grade oil shale deposits after the Australian torbanite. Its organic content varies from 15% to 55%, averaging over 40%. Correspondingly, its mean calorific value is 15 MJ/kg (3,600 kcal/kg). The conversion ratio of its organic content into usable energy (shale oil and oil shale gas) is between 65 and 67%, and its Fischer Assay oil yield is 30 to 47%.

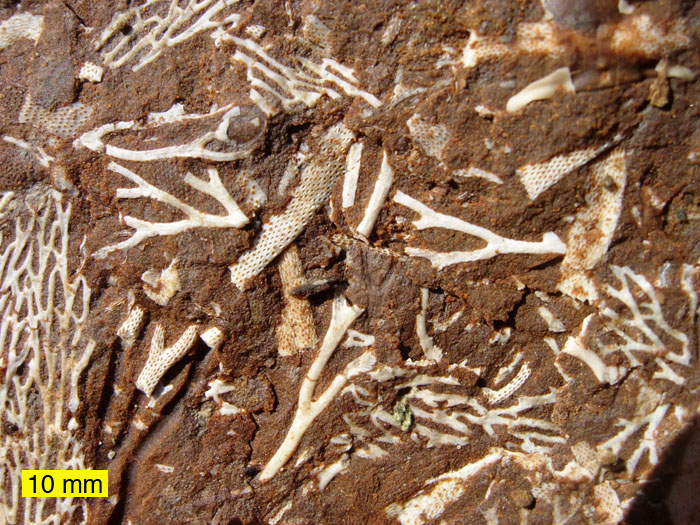
Fossils in northern Estonian kukersite

The principal organic component of kukersite is telalginite, which originated from the fossil green alga Gloeocapsomorpha prisca, deposited in a shallow marine basin. Kukersite lies at depths of 7 to 170 metres (23 to 558 ft). The most significant kukersite deposits in Estonia – the Estonian and the Tapa – cover about 3,000 to 5,000 square kilometres (1,200 to 1,900 sq mi), and together with the Leningrad deposit (an extension of the Estonian) form the Baltic Oil Shale Basin. The Estonian deposit, which covers about 2,000 square kilometres (770 sq mi), is used industrially. It consists of 23 exploration and mining fields. The Tapa deposit is not accounted as a reserve due to its lower calorific value, which makes its extraction economically inexpedient. In northern Estonia there are 50 layers of kukersite; the six lowest of these form a 2.5-to-3-metre (8 ft 2 in to 9 ft 10 in) thick mineable bed. In this area kukersite lies near the surface. To the south and west it lies deeper and its thickness and quality decrease.

According to the International Energy Agency, Estonia's kukersite represents about 1.1% of global and 17% of European oil shale resources. The total kukersite resources in Estonia are estimated to be about 4.8 billion tonnes, including 1.3 billion tonnes of economically proven and probable reserves. Economically proven and probable reserves consist of mineable deposits with energy ratings of at least 35 gigajoules per square metre and calorific values of at least 8 MJ/kg, located in areas without environmental restrictions. Up to 650 million tonnes of economically proven and probable reserves are designated as recoverable.

== History ==
=== Early history ===
It is often reported that 18th-century naturalist and explorer Johann Anton Güldenstädt had mentioned a discovery of a "burning rock" near Jõhvi in 1725, but his published travel notes mention neither oil shale nor Estonia. It is also often reported that the earliest documented record of oil shale in Estonia, authored by the Baltic German publicist and linguist August Wilhelm Hupel, dates to 1777. However, this is based on a misinterpretation of the German word Steinöhl (meaning: stone oil), which was used by Hupel but which most likely did not mean oil shale in the context of his publication.

In the second half of the 18th century, the St. Petersburg Free Economic Society started to search for information about combustible minerals which as fuels would replace the decreasing stock of trees in the European part of Russia. As a result of these inquiries, the Society received information about a combustible mineral found at the Kohala Manor near Rakvere. According to the landlord of the Kohala estate, Baron Fabian Reinhold Ungern-Sternberg, the 'burning rock' was discovered at a depth of about ten meters when a spring was opened on the slope of a sandy hump, as it was during the digging of a well some years earlier on the same slope. This discovery was briefly mentioned in a paper prepared by the German chemist Johann Gottlieb Georgi and presented by the Actual State Councillor Anton-Johann Engelhardt at the meeting of the Society in 1789. The first scientific research into the rock's oil yield, using samples from the village of Vanamõisa of the Kohala Manor, was published by Georgi at the Russian Academy of Sciences in 1791. In 1838 and 1839, the Baltic German geologist Gregor von Helmersen published a detailed description of the deposits of kukersite in Vanamõisa and graptolitic argillite in Keila-Joa. In 1838 he made a thorough experiment to distil oil from the Vanamõisa oil shale deposit.

During the 1850s, large-scale works were undertaken in Estonia to transform excessively wet land into land suitable for agriculture; this included the digging of drainage ditches. In the process, previously unknown layers of oil shale were discovered in several locations. In the years 1850–1857, the territory of Estonia was explored by the Baltic German geologist Carl Friedrich Schmidt who studied these findings of oil shale. Russian chemist Aleksandr Shamarin, who at the end of the 1860s had studied the composition and properties of oil shale originating from the Kukruse area, concluded it made sense to use oil shale for the production of gas and as a solid fuel. However, he considered shale oil production unprofitable. During the remainder of the 19th century oil shale was used locally as a low-grade fuel only. For example, in the 1870s, Robert von Toll, landlord of the Kukruse Manor, started to use oil shale as a fuel for the manor's distillery. There were failed attempts to use graptolitic argillite as fertilizer in the 19th century. In the beginning of the 20th century, geologist and engineer Carl August von Mickwitz studied self-ignition of graptolitic argillite near Paldiski. At the University of Tartu oil shale geology and chemistry analyses were conducted during the 19th century by Georg Paul Alexander Petzholdt, Alexander Gustav von Schrenk, and Carl Ernst Heinrich Schmidt, among others.

=== Beginning of the oil shale industry ===
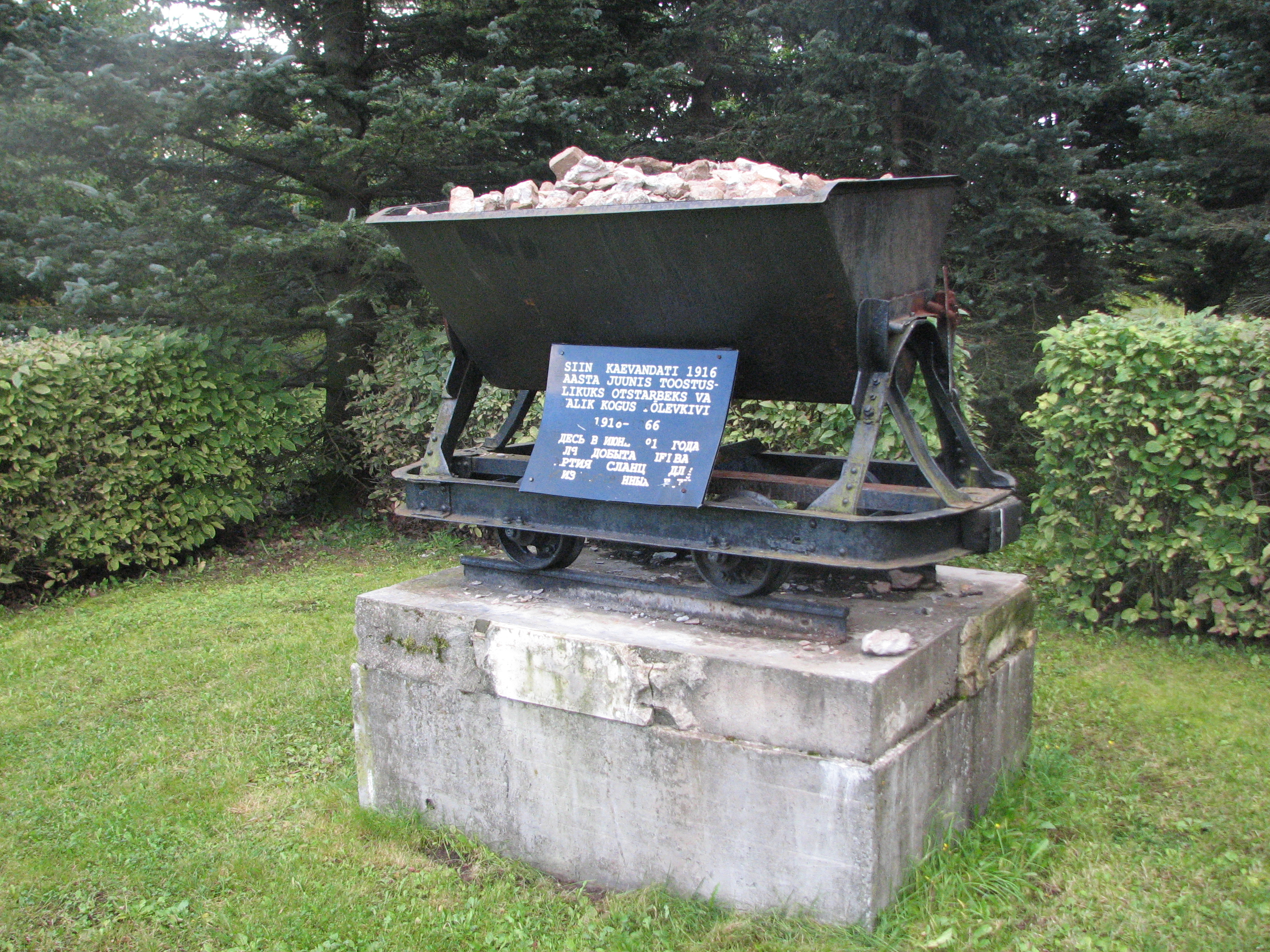
Historical monument at the location where the first tonnes of oil shale were mined in Pavandu, Kohtla-Järve

Analysis of Estonian oil shale resources and mining possibilities intensified during the early 20th century while Estonia was part of the Russian Empire. Industrial development was under way in Saint Petersburg (known as Petrograd in 1914–24), but regional fuel resources were in short supply. A large shale oil extraction plant for processing Estonian oil shale was proposed in 1910. The outbreak of World War I, coupled with a fuel supply crisis, accelerated the pace of the research.

In June 1916, the Russian geologist Nikolay Pogrebov oversaw mining of the first tonnes of oil shale at Pavandu and delivered it to Saint Petersburg (then Petrograd) Polytechnic Institute for large-scale experiments. These events marking the beginning of the Estonian oil shale industry took place more than half a century after an oil shale industry had emerged in Scotland, the leading oil shale industry in 1916, and a decade before the industry emerged in China, which, besides Estonia, is today the other leading oil shale-exploiting country. In 1916 a total of 640–690 tonnes of oil shale were sent to Saint Petersburg for testing. The tests proved that the oil shale was suitable for combustion as a solid fuel and for extraction of oil shale gas and shale oil. Based on these promising results, a plan for oil shale mining in Estonia was presented to the Emperor Nicholas II on 3 January 1917. On 13 February 1917, the Council of Ministers of Russia allocated 1.2 million roubles to purchase land and start mining activities. After the February Revolution, the Russian Provisional Government appointed a special commissioner for oil shale purchasing and stockpiling who began preliminary work for the digging of an oil shale mine at Pavandu, with full-scale construction carried out by about 500 workers, including war prisoners, in the summer of 1917. After the October Revolution, financing ceased and construction stopped. Two private Saint Petersburg firms, established specially for oil shale mining, Böckel & Co. and Mutschnik & Co., which in the fall of 1916 had begun surface mining at Kukruse and Järve, respectively, also terminated their mining activities in 1917.

In February 1918, the area surrounding the oil shale basin in northeast Estonia was occupied by German troops. During this occupation, mining activities were carried out at Pavandu by the German company Internationales Baukonsortium (English: International Construction Consortium), including sending oil shale to Germany for research and experimentation. This work used a retort constructed by Julius Pintsch AG, known as a Pintsch generator. In late 1918, German forces left Estonia, by which time no more than a single trainload of oil shale had been mined and sent to Germany.

=== Developments in interwar Estonia ===
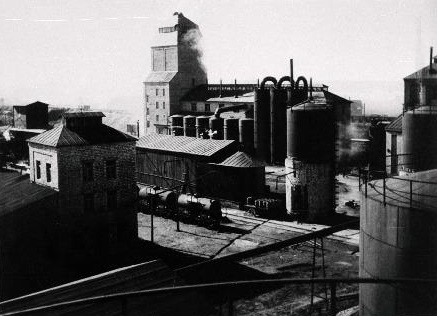
Kohtla-Järve shale oil extraction plant (Esimene Eesti Põlevkivitööstus, 1937. Photo by Carl Sarap)

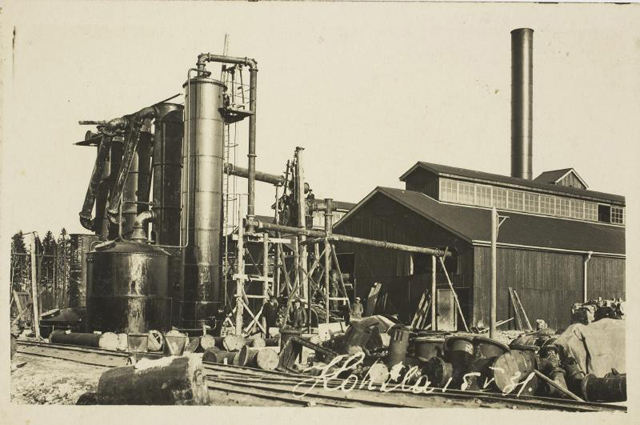
Kohtla shale oil extraction plant (New Consolidated Gold Fields Ltd., 1931)

After Estonia gained independence, the state owned oil shale enterprise, Riigi Põlevkivitööstus (English: Estonian State Oil Shale Industry), was established as a department of the Ministry for Trade and Industry on 24 November 1918. The enterprise, later named Esimene Eesti Põlevkivitööstus (English: First Estonian Oil Shale Industry), was the predecessor of Viru Keemia Grupp, one of the current shale oil producers in Estonia. It took over the existing Pavandu open-pit mine, and opened new mines at Vanamõisa (1919), Kukruse (1920), and Käva (1924). Also, several private investors, including investors from abroad, initiated oil shale industries in Estonia by opening mines at Kiviõli (1922), Küttejõu (1925), Ubja (1926), Viivikonna (1936), and Kohtla (1937). Pavandu mine was closed in 1927 and Vanamõisa mine was closed in 1931. While in 1918 only 16 tonnes and in 1919 only 9,631 tonnes of oil shale were mined, in 1937 the annual output exceeded one million tonnes. In 1940, the annual output reached 1,891,674 tonnes.

Initially, oil shale was used primarily in the cement industry, but also for firing locomotive furnaces and as a household fuel. The first major industrial consumers of oil shale were cement factories in Kunda and Aseri. By 1925, all locomotives in Estonia were powered by oil shale.

Shale oil production started in Estonia in 1921 when Riigi Põlevkivitööstus built 14 experimental oil shale processing retorts in Kohtla-Järve. These vertical retorts used the method developed by Julius Pintsch AG that would later evolve into the current Kiviter processing technology. Along with the shale oil extraction plant, an oil shale research laboratory was founded in 1921. Following the experimental retorts, the first commercial shale oil plant was put into operation on 24 December 1924. The German-owned company Eesti Kiviõli (German: Estländische Steinöl, English: Estonian Stone Oil, predecessor of Kiviõli Keemiatööstus), affiliated with G. Scheel & Co. and Mendelssohn & Co., was established in 1922. By the end of the 1930s, it had become the largest shale oil producer in Estonia. Around the company's mine and oil plant, the Kiviõli settlement (now town) was formed in the same way as the Küttejõu settlement (now district of Kiviõli) formed around the mine owned by Eesti Küttejõud. In 1924, the British investor-owned Estonian Oil Development Syndicate Ltd. (later Vanamõisa Oilfields Ltd.) purchased an open-pit mine in Vanamõisa and opened a shale oil extraction plant that was abandoned in 1931 due to technical problems. The Swedish–Norwegian consortium Eestimaa Õlikonsortsium (Swedish: Estländska Oljeskifferkonsortiet, English: Estonian Oil Consortium), controlled by Marcus Wallenberg, was founded in Sillamäe in 1926. New Consolidated Gold Fields Ltd. of the United Kingdom built a shale oil extraction plant at Kohtla-Nõmme in 1931. This facility continued to operate until 1961.

In 1934, Eesti Kiviõli and New Consolidated Gold Fields established the service station chain Trustivapaa Bensiini (now: Teboil) in Finland, which in 1940 sold more shale-oil-derived gasoline in Finland than did the entire conventional gasoline market in Estonia. Since 1935, Estonian shale oil has been supplied to the German Kriegsmarine as a ship fuel. In 1938, 45% of Estonian shale oil was exported, accounting for 8% of Estonia's total exports. Although the price of oil shale-based gasoline was at least triple that of global gasoline prices, high production and bilateral agreements with Germany facilitated its export. In 1939, Estonia produced 181,000 tonnes of shale oil, including 22,500 tonnes of oil that were suitable gasoline equivalents. The mining and oil industry employed 6,150 persons.

The oil shale-fired electrical power industry started in 1924 when the Tallinn Power Station switched to oil shale. In 1933, it reached a capacity of 22 megawatts (MW). Other oil shale-fired power stations were built in Püssi (3.7 MW), Kohtla (3.7 MW), Kunda (2.3 MW), and Kiviõli (0.8 MW). At the beginning of World War II, the total capacity of oil shale-fired power stations was 32.5 MW. Only the Tallinn and Püssi power stations were connected to the grid.

On 9 May 1922 the first international discussion of Estonian kukersite took place at the 64th meeting of the Institution of Petroleum Technologists. Systematic research into oil shale and its products began at Tartu University's Oil Shale Research Laboratory in 1925, initiated by professor Paul Kogerman. In 1937, the Geological Committee under the Ministry of Economic Affairs, and the Institute of Natural Resources, an independent academic institution, were established. A department of mining was established at Tallinn Technical University in 1938. Estonian oil shale industries conducted tests of oil shale samples from Australia, Bulgaria, Germany and South Africa.

=== Developments in German-occupied Estonia ===
Soon after the Soviet occupation in 1940, the entire oil shale industry was nationalised and subordinated to the Mining Office and later to the General Directorate of Mining and Fuel Industry of the Peoples' Commissariat for Light Industry. Germany invaded the Soviet Union in 1941 and the industry's infrastructure was largely destroyed by retreating Soviet forces. During the subsequent German occupation, the industry was merged into a company named Baltische Öl GmbH. Baltische Öl became the largest industry in the Estonian territory. This entity was subordinated to Kontinentale Öl, a company that had exclusive rights to oil production in German-occupied territories.

The primary purpose of the industry was production of oil for the German Army. In 1943, after the German troops retreated from the Caspian oil region, Estonian oil shale became increasingly important. On 16 March 1943, Hermann Göring issued a secret order stating that "development and utilisation of Estonian oil shale industry is the most important military-economic task in the territories of the former Baltic states". On 21 June 1943, Reichsführer Heinrich Himmler issued an order to send as many male Jews as possible to the oil shale mining.

Baltische Öl consisted of five units (Kiviõli, Küttejõu, Kohtla-Järve, Sillamäe, and Kohtla), all of which were partially restored, previously existing industries. In addition, Baltische Öl started construction of a new mining and shale oil extraction complex in Ahtme, but it never became operational. Prisoners of war and forced labour made up about two-thirds of the work force in these units.

While Soviet troops were advancing into Estonia during 1944, about 200 Estonian oil shale specialists were evacuated to Schömberg, Germany, to work at an oil shale industry there, codenamed Operation Desert (Unternehmen Wüste). Shale oil extraction plants in Estonia were destroyed and mines were ignited or inundated by the retreating Germans. Existing oil shale-fired power stations were also destroyed.

=== Developments in Soviet Estonia ===
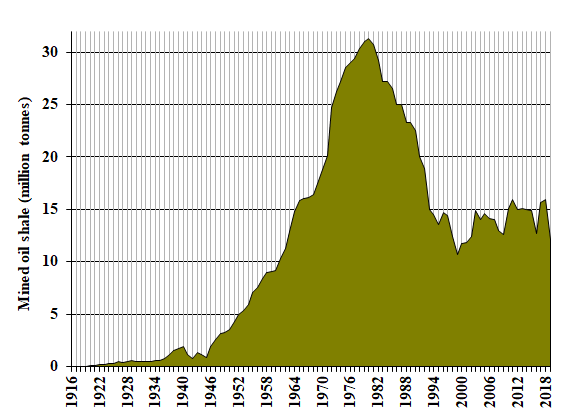
Annual amount of mined oil shale in Estonia (millions of metric tonnes from 1916 to 2019. Source: John R. Dyni, Statistical Office of Estonia; Estonian Oil Shale Industry Yearbook 2019)

In 1945–1946 the mining industry was merged into Eesti Põlevkivi (Russian: Эстонсланец, literally: Estonian Oil Shale; now part of Enefit Power) under the General Directorate of Oil Shale Industry of the USSR (Glavslanets). Shale oil extraction, except the Kiviõli and Kohtla-Nõmme plants, was merged into the Kohtla-Järve shale oil combinate (Russian: Сланцехим, now Viru Keemia Grupp) under the General Directorate of Synthetic Liquid Fuel and Gas of the USSR (Glavgaztopprom). Both organisations were directed from Moscow.

New mines were opened in Ahtme (1948), Jõhvi (No. 2, 1949), Sompa (1949), Tammiku (1951), and in the area between Käva and Sompa (No. 4, 1953). The Küttejõu open-pit mine was closed in 1947 and the Küttejõu underground mine was merged with the Kiviõli mine in 1951. The Ubja mine was closed in 1959. After construction of large oil shale-fired power stations, demand for oil shale increased and consequently new larger mines were constructed: the underground mines Viru (1965) and Estonia (1972) along with the open-pit mines Sirgala (1963), Narva (1970) and Oktoobri (1974; later named Aidu). Correspondingly, several exhausted smaller mines like Kukruse (1967), Käva (1972), No. 2 (1973), No. 4 (1975), and Kiviõli (1987) were closed. The Estonia Mine became the largest oil shale mine in the world. Because of the success of oil shale-based power generation, Estonian oil shale mining peaked in 1980 at 31.35 million tonnes, and in the same year power generation peaked at 18.9 TWh. The industry declined during the subsequent two decades. Demand for electric power generated from oil shale decreased following construction of nuclear power stations in the Russian SFSR, particularly the Leningrad Nuclear Power Station. At the end of 1988, a fire broke out in the Estonia Mine. The largest underground fire in Estonia, it continued for 81 days and caused serious pollution of ground and surface waters.

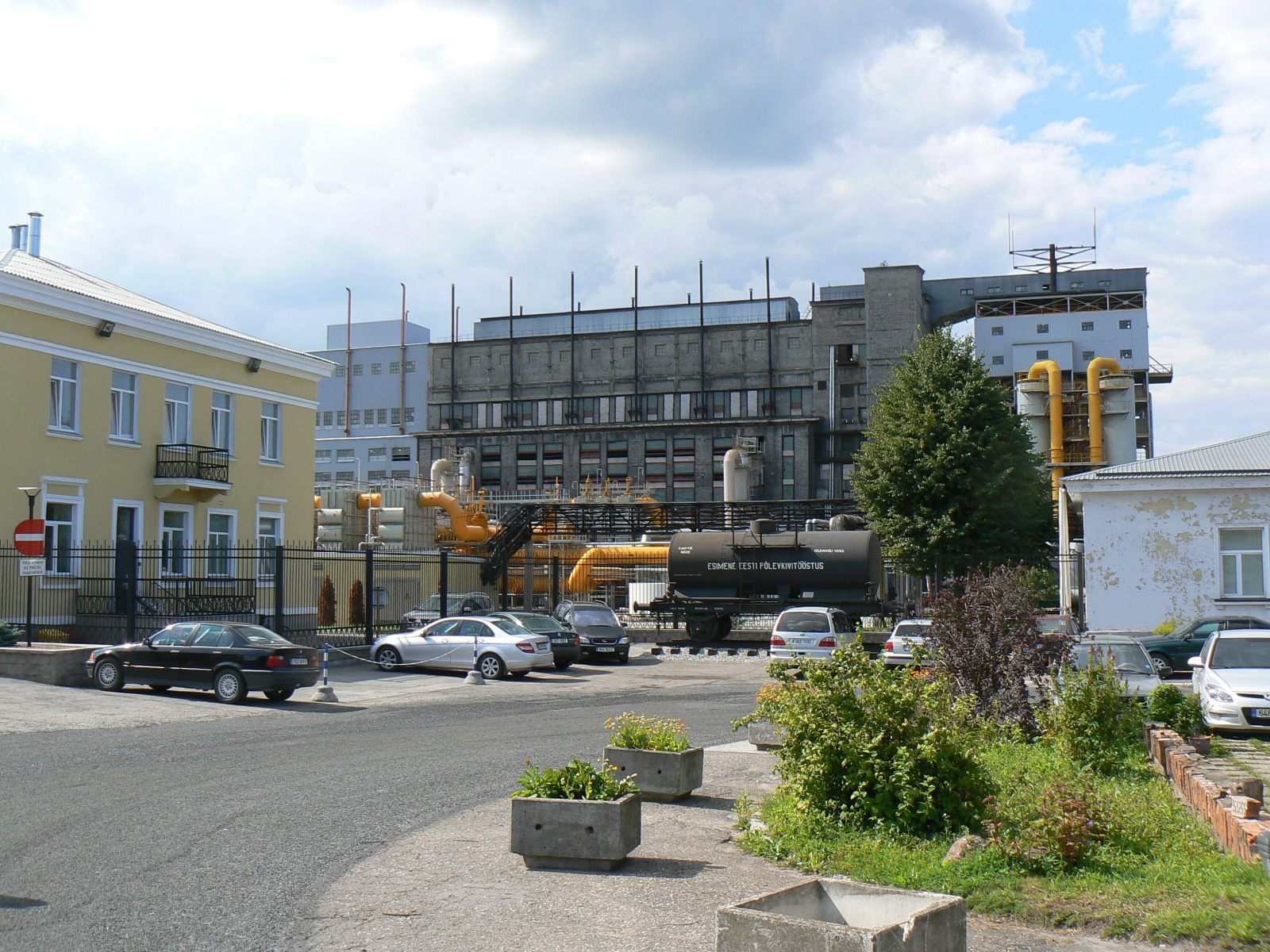
Old shale oil extraction plant in Kohtla-Järve (2009)

The shale oil industry at Kohtla-Järve and Kiviõli was redeveloped. In 1945, the first tunnel kiln was restored, and by the end of the 1940s four tunnel kilns located in Kiviõli and Kohtla-Nõmme had been restored. German prisoners of war contributed most of the labour. Between 1946 and 1963, 13 Kiviter-type retorts were built in Kohtla-Järve and eight in Kiviõli. In 1947, a pilot Galoter retort was built at the Ilmarine engineering plant in Tallinn. This unit, in operation until 1956, was capable of processing 2.5 tonnes of oil shale per day and was used for modelling the next generation of commercial-scale retorts. The first Galoter-type commercial-scale pilot retorts were built at Kiviõli in 1953 and 1963 with capacities of 200 and 500 tonnes of oil shale per day, respectively. The first of these retorts closed in 1963 and the second in 1981. The Narva Oil Plant, annexed to the Eesti Power Station and operating two Galoter-type 3,000-tonnes-per day retorts, was commissioned in 1980. Started as a pilot plant, the process of converting it to a commercial-scale plant took about 20 years.

In 1948 an oil shale gas plant in Kohtla-Järve became operational, and for several decades the oil shale gas was used as a substitute for natural gas in Saint Petersburg (then known as Leningrad) and in northern Estonian cities. It was the first time in history that synthetic gas from oil shale was used in households. To enable delivery of the gas, a 200-kilometre (120 mi) pipeline from Kohtla-Järve to Saint Peterburg was built, followed by a 150-kilometre (93 mi) pipeline from Kohtla-Järve to Tallinn. During the 1950s, unsuccessful tests of oil shale underground gasification were conducted at Kiviõli. In 1962 and 1963, the conversion of oil shale gas into ammonium was tested; however, for industrial production, oil shale gas was replaced with natural gas. Although this gas had become uneconomical by 1958, production continued and was even expanded. After peaking in 1976 at 597.4 million cubic metres (21.10×10^{9} cu ft), oil shale gas production ceased in 1987. In total, 276 generators were operated for the gas production.

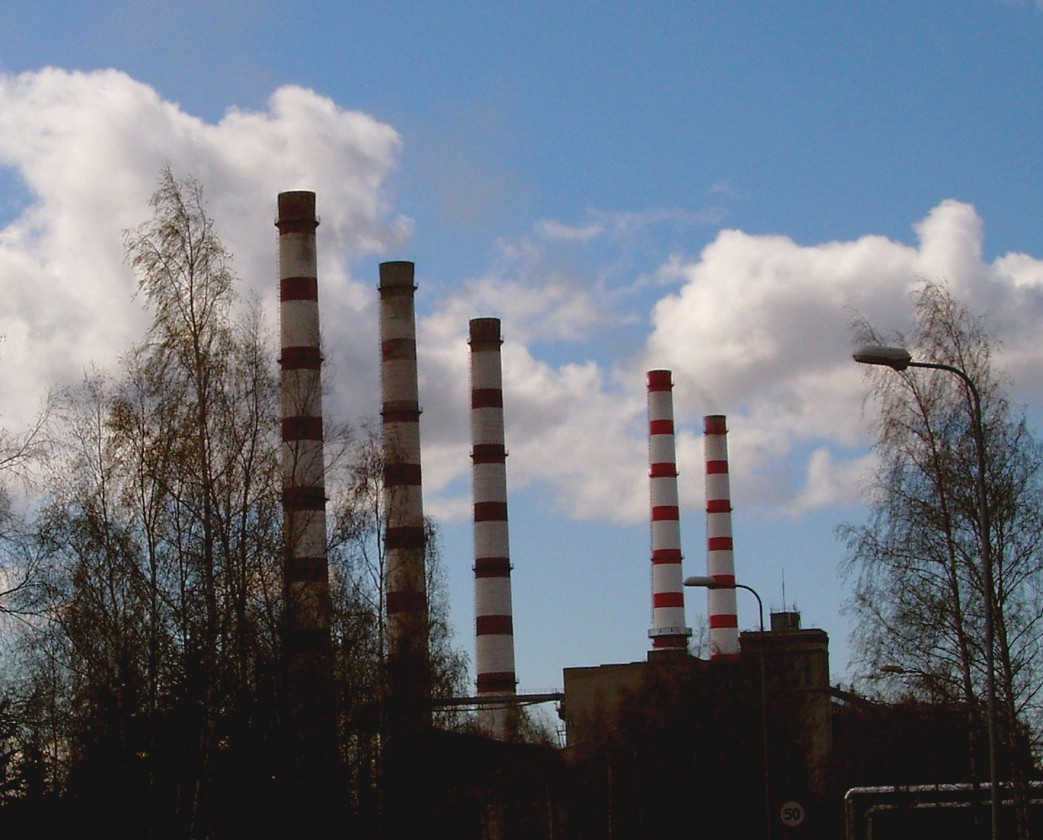
The Balti Power Station (2007)

In 1949, the 48 MW Kohtla-Järve Power Station – the first power station in the world to use pulverised oil shale at an industrial scale – was commissioned, followed by the 72.5 MW Ahtme Power Station in 1951. To ensure sufficient electricity supply in Estonia, Latvia and north-west Russia, the Balti Power Station (1,430 MW) and the Eesti Power Station (1,610 MW) were built, the former between 1959 and 1971 and the latter between 1969 and 1973. The stations, collectively known as the Narva Power Stations, are the world's two largest oil shale-fired power stations. In 1988 Moscow-based authorities planned a third oil shale-fired power station in Narva with a capacity of 2,500 MW, together with a new mine at Kuremäe. The plan, disclosed at the time of the Phosphorite War and the Singing Revolution, met with strong local opposition and was never implemented.

Between 1946 and 1952, uranium compounds were extracted from locally mined graptolitic argillite at the Sillamäe Processing Plant (now: Silmet). More than 60 tonnes of uranium compounds (corresponding to 22.5 tonnes of elemental uranium) were produced. Some sources note that uranium produced in Sillamäe was used for construction of the first Soviet atomic bomb; however, this information is not confirmed by the archive materials.

An oil shale research institute (now a department within Tallinn University of Technology) was founded at Kohtla-Järve in 1958. Preliminary research into oil shale-based chemical production began the same year, exploring the potential for the use of oil shale in bitumen, synthetic construction materials, detergents, synthetic leathers, synthetic fibres, plastics, paints, soaps, glues, and pesticides. Between 1959 and 1985, 5.275 billion cubic metres (186.3×10^{9} cu ft) of mineral wool were produced from oil shale coke, a solid residue of oil shale. In 1968, a branch of the Skochinsky Institute of Mining was established in Kohtla-Järve, and in 1984 the scientific-technical journal Oil Shale was founded in Estonia.

=== Developments in independent Estonia ===
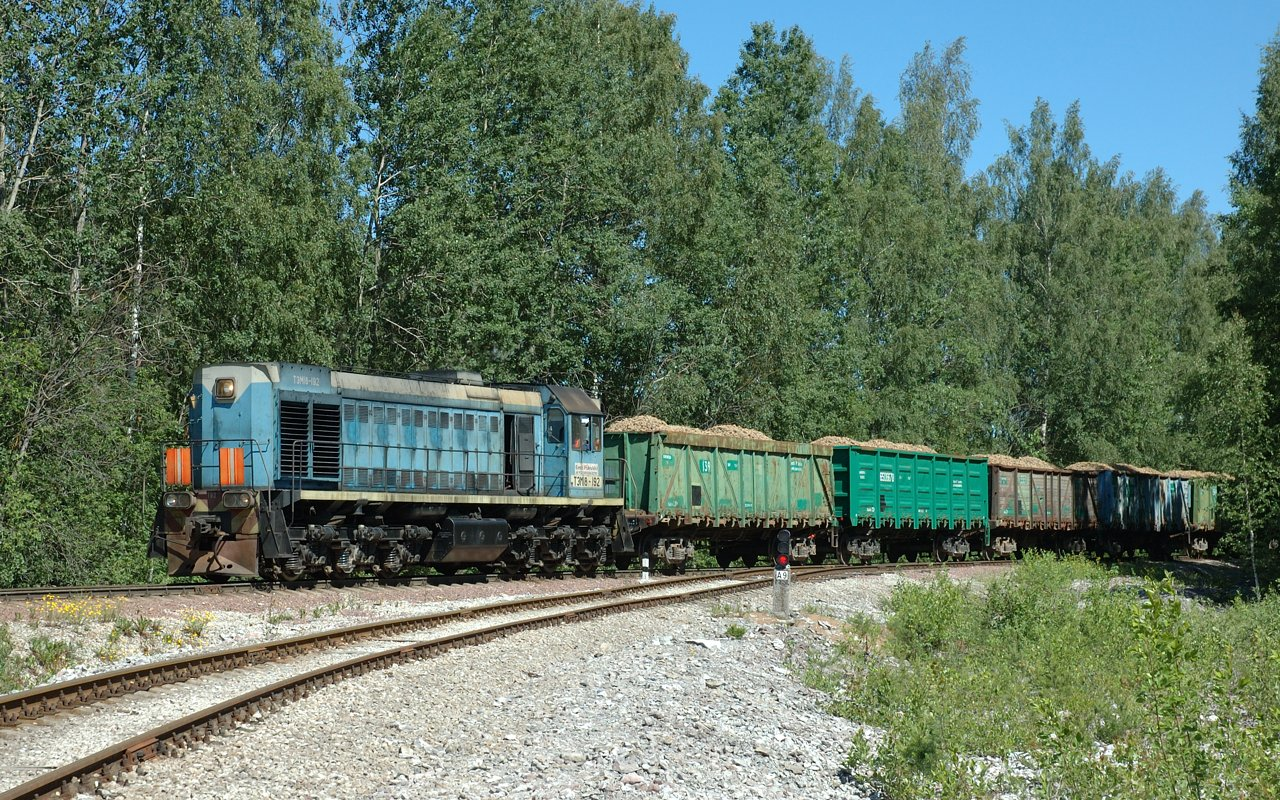
Oil shale cargo train near Ahtme (2007)

In the 1990s, after Estonia regained independence, the country underwent a restructuring of the economy, causing the collapse of a large part of the heavy industry sector. This collapse led to a decrease in the consumption of electricity and thus a decrease in the need for the oil shale that was mined to produce it. Electricity and shale oil export to former Soviet markets largely ceased. Due to a decrease in demand, the Tammiku and Sompa mines closed in 1999 and those at Kohtla and Ahtme closed in 2001.

In 1995, state-owned shale oil producers in Kohtla-Järve and Kiviõli were merged into the single company named RAS Kiviter. In 1997, Kiviter was privatized and a year later it declared insolvency. Its factories in Kohtla-Järve and Kiviõli were sold separately and new oil producers – Viru Keemia Grupp and Kiviõli Keemiatööstus – emerged.

In 1995, the Government of Estonia started negotiations with American company NRG Energy to create a joint venture on the basis of the Narva Power Stations, the largest consumer of oil shale in Estonia. As a part of the deal, 51% of the government-owned shares in the oil shale mining company Eesti Põlevkivi was transferred to the Narva Power Stations. The proposed deal with NRG Energy met a strong public and political opposition and was cancelled after NRG Energy failed the deadline to secure financing for the project. Consequently, the Government transferred its remained shares in Eesti Põlevkivi to a state-owned company Eesti Energia, a parent company of the Narva Power Stations, and Eesti Põlevkivi became a fully owned subsidiary of Eesti Energia.

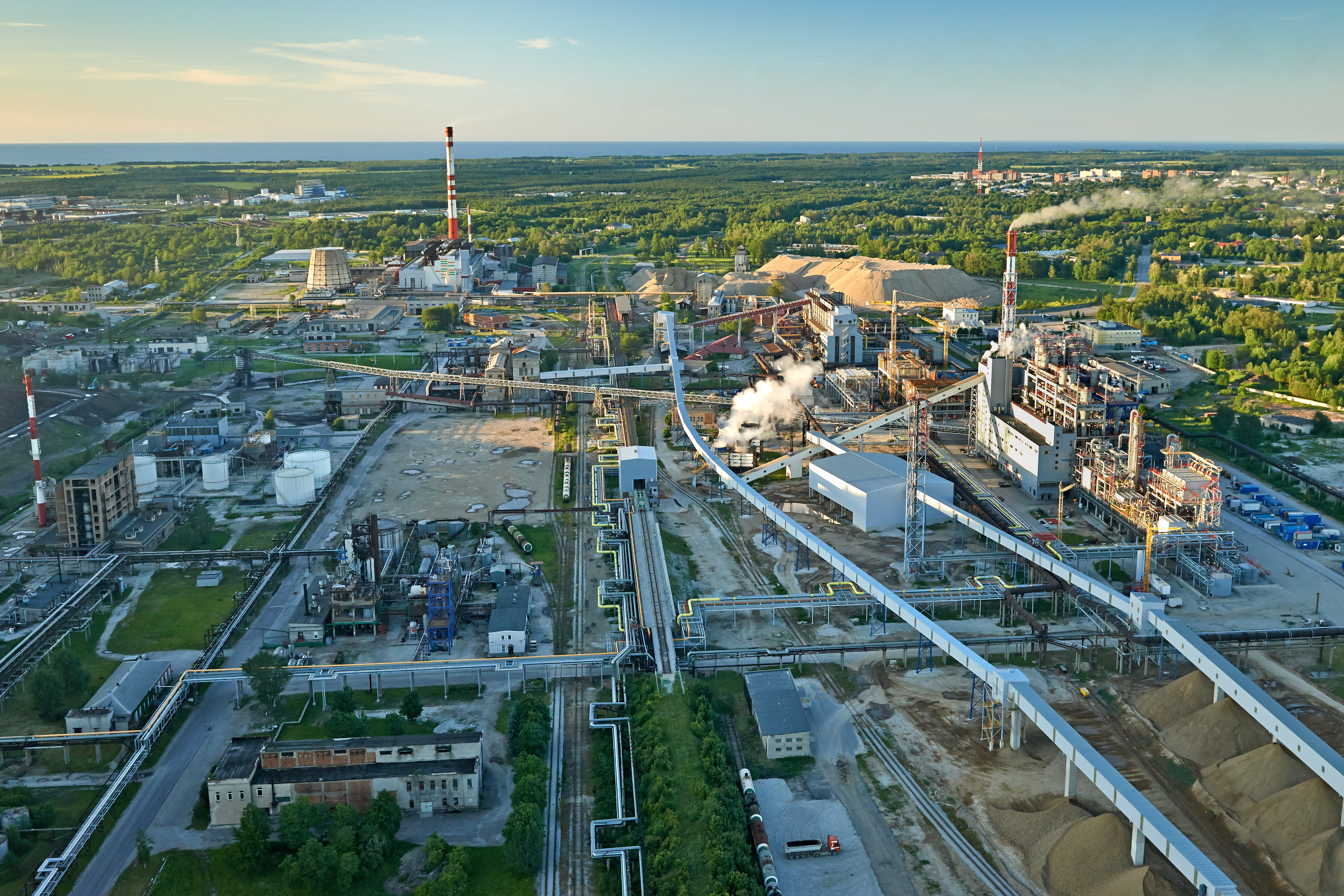
VKG Energia

Oil shale production started to increase again in the beginning of the 21st century. In 2000, the open-pit mines at Viivikonna, Sirgala and Narva were merged into the single Narva open-pit mine. Since 2003, several new mines were opened: the Põhja-Kiviõli open-pit mine in 2003, the Ubja open-pit mine in 2005, and the Ojamaa underground mine in 2010. By 2006, after 90 years of major mining in Estonia, the total amount of mined oil shale reached one billion tonnes. The exhausted Aidu open-pit mine was closed in 2012, followed a year later by the Viru underground mine.

In 2004, two power units with circulating fluidised bed combustion boilers were put into operation at the Narva Power Stations. Construction of the Auvere Power Station, located next to the existing Eesti Power Station, began in 2012. In the end of 2012, the Ahtme Power Station was closed.

In 2008, Eesti Energia established a joint venture, Enefit Outotec Technology, with the Finnish technology company Outotec. The venture sought to develop and commercialise a modified Galoter process–the Enefit process–that would enhance the existing technology by using circulating fluidised beds. In 2013, Enefit Outotec Technology opened an Enefit testing plant in Frankfurt.

Kiviõli Keemiatööstus began to test two Galoter-type retorts in 2006. Eesti Energia opened a new generation Galoter-type plant using Enefit 280 technology in 2012. VKG Oil opened three new Galoter-type oil plants called Petroter correspondingly in December 2009, in October 2014, and in November 2015.

In 2020, Eesti Energia announced a plan to build additional oil plant by 2023. At the same time, it cancelled a shale oil pre-refinery project developed jointly with Viru Keemia Grupp.

In spring 2021, the government coalition of Estonian Reform Party and Estonian Centre Party put a political target in their coalition agreement to stop oil shale power generation by 2035 and using oil shale in the entire energy sector by 2040 at the latest. Shortly after, Eesti Energia announced it will stop burning oil shale for electricity generation by 2025 and burning oil shale gas by 2030. It will close older type shale oil plants by 2040 while in newer generation shale oil plants oil shale will be replaced with waste plastics. Estonia is negotiating with the European Commission to receive €340 million support from the Just Transition Fund to mitigate the impact of the oil shale industry transition.

== Economic impact ==
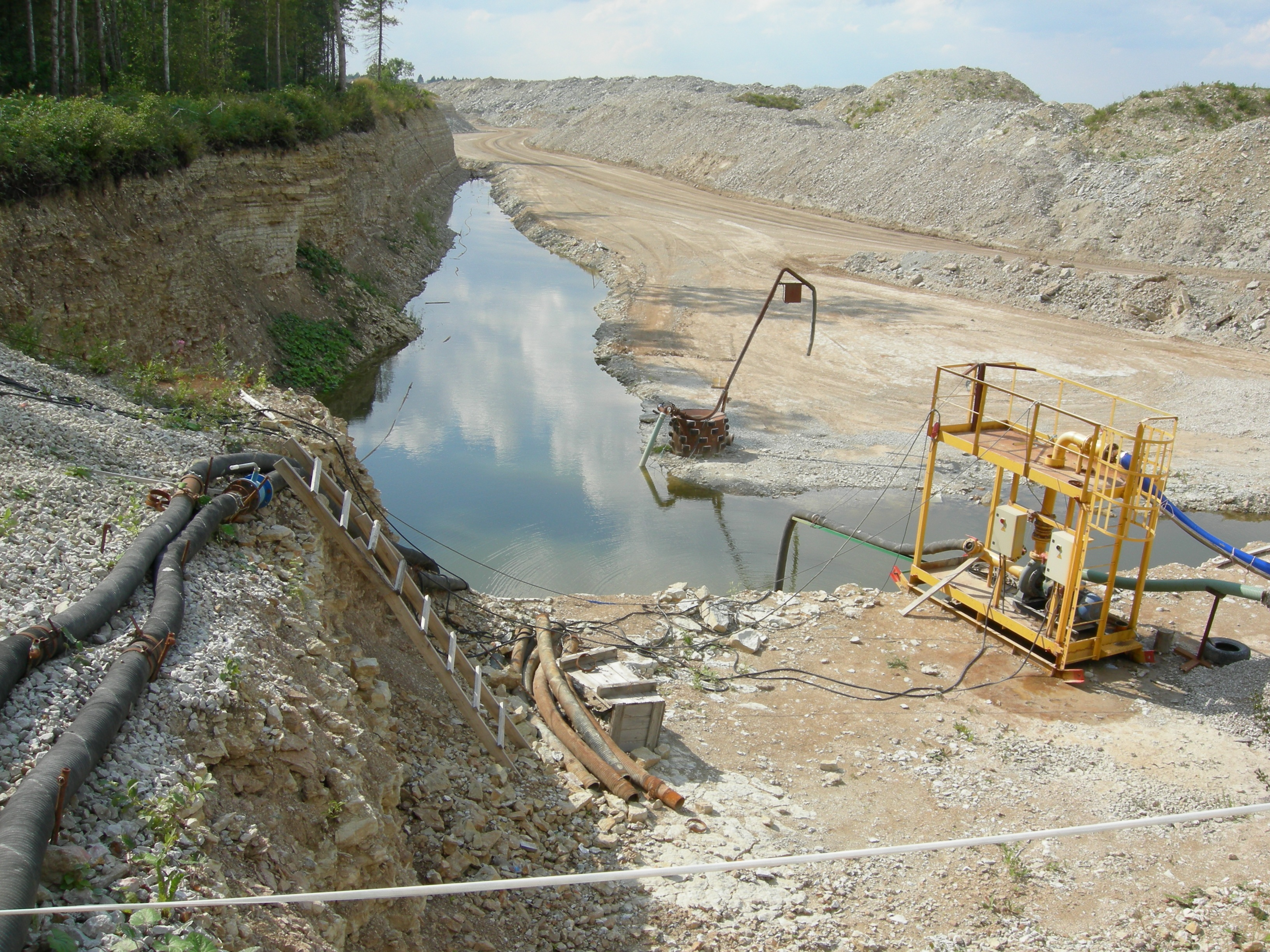
Põhja-Kiviõli oil shale mine near Kohtla-Järve (2007)

The oil shale industry in Estonia is one of the most developed in the world. The National Development Plan for the Utilisation of Oil Shale 2016–2030 describes oil shale as a strategic resource. Estonia is the only country in the world that uses oil shale as its primary energy source. In 2018, oil shale accounted for 72% of Estonia's total domestic energy production and supplied 73% of Estonia's total primary energy. About 7,300 people (over 1% of the total workforce in Estonia) were employed in the oil shale industry. The state revenue from oil shale production was about €122 million.

=== Mining ===
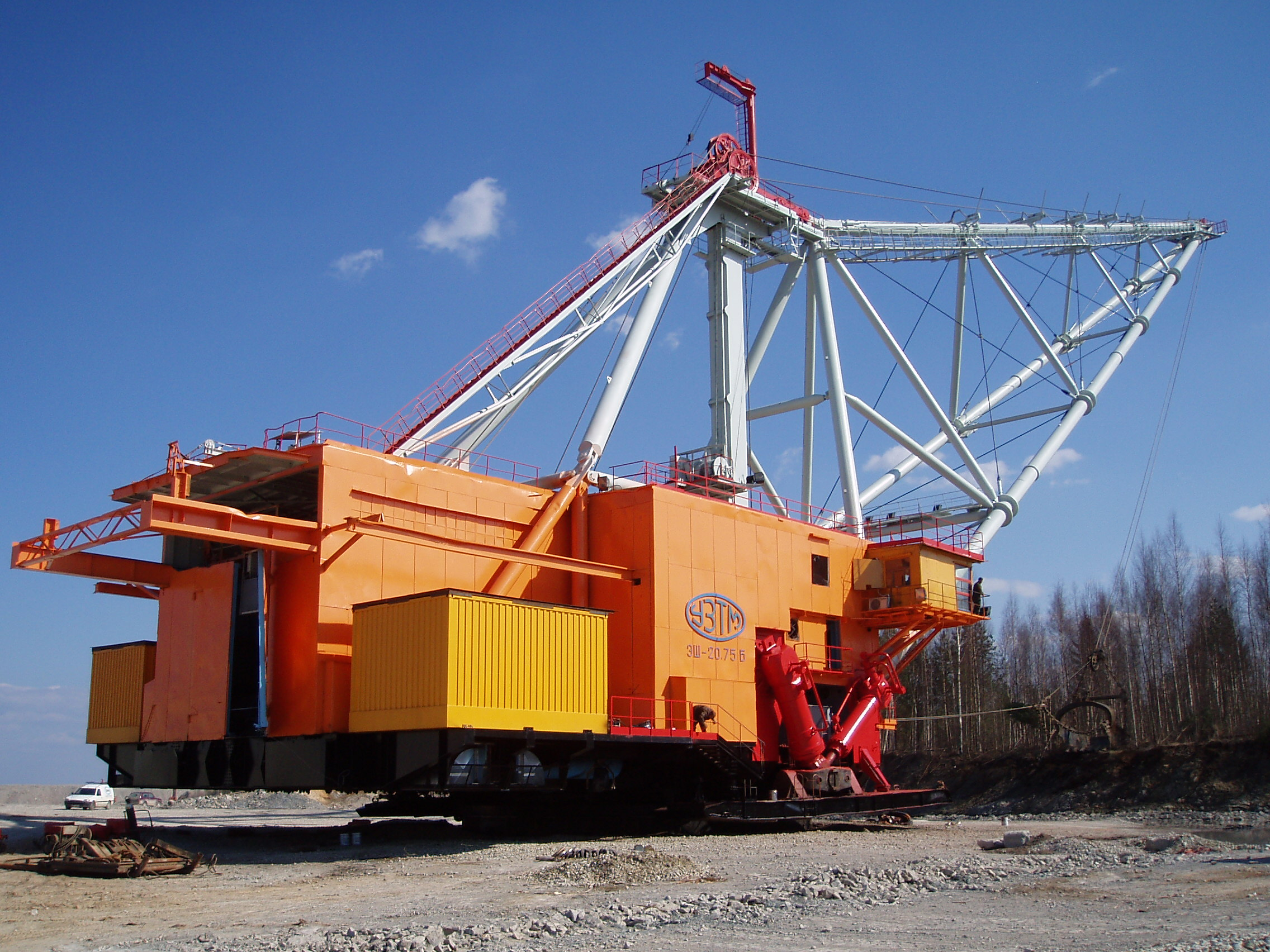
Dragline excavator in the Narva open-pit mine (2005)

Estonia has adopted a national development plan that limits the annual mining of oil shale to 20 million tonnes. If mined at this rate, mineable reserves will last for 25–30 years. In 2019, 12.127 million tonnes of oil shale were mined. As of 2021, five oil shale mines are in operation; three are open-pit mines and two are underground mines. The mines are owned by four companies. Several mining companies have applied for permits for opening new mines. Historically, the ratio of underground mining to open-pit mining has been approximately even, but usable deposits close to the surface has become scarcer.

The Estonia underground mine at Väike-Pungerja, operated by Enefit Power, a subsidiary of Eesti Energia, is the largest oil shale mine in the world. The other underground mine, operated by privately owned Viru Keemia Grupp, is located at Ojamaa. Both mines use the room and pillar mining method. Oil shale mined at Ojamaa is transported to the processing plant by a unique 13-kilometre (8.1 mi) conveyor belt. Although there are similar conveyors in operation in other countries, the one at Ojamaa is an unusually challenging installation since its path contains many curves and sharp turns.

The Narva open-pit mine is operated by Enefit Power, and the Põhja-Kiviõli open-pit mine is operated by privately owned Kiviõli Keemiatööstus. Both mines use highly selective extraction in three layers of seams. The Narva mine uses a technology that involves breaking up both the overburden and the targeted deposits by blasting and then stripping the rock with relatively large-bucket (10–35 cubic metres or 350–1,240 cubic feet) excavators. The company has applied and received a permit to start oil-shale mining in Narva by using underground longwall mining technology. The third open-pit mine, operated by Kunda Nordic Tsement which belongs to German HeidelbergCement group, is located at Ubja.

Enefit Power and VKG Oil plan to open jointly a new mine in Oandu.

Oil shale mines in Estonia
Mine	Type	Opened	Closed	Owner(s)	Coordinates
Pavandu	open-pit	1917	1927	Special commissioner (1917); Internationales Baukonsortium (1918); Riigi Põlevkivitööstus (1918–1927)	
Vanamõisa	open-pit	1919	1931	Riigi Põlevkivitööstus (1919–1924); Estonian Oil Development Syndicate Ltd. (1924–1930); Vanamõisa Oilfields Ltd. (1930–1931)	
Kukruse	open-pit	1920	1920	Riigi Põlevkivitööstus	
Küttejõu	open-pit	1925	1946	Eesti Küttejõud (1925–1941); Baltische Öl (1941–1944); Eesti Põlevkivi (1944–1946)	
Kukruse	underground	1921	1967	Riigi Põlevkivitööstus (1925–1936); Esimene Eesti Põlevkivitööstus (1936–1941); Baltische Öl (1941–1944); Eesti Põlevkivi (1944–1967)	
Kiviõli	open-pit	1922	1931	Eesti Kiviõli	
Ubja	underground	1924	1959	Port Kunda (1924–1941); Punane Kunda (1941); Port Kunda (1941–1944); Punane Kunda (1944–1957); Eesti Põlevkivi (1957–1959)	
Käva	underground	1924	1972	Riigi Põlevkivitööstus (1924–1936); Esimene Eesti Põlevkivitööstus (1936–1941); Baltische Öl (1941–1944); Eesti Põlevkivi (1944–1972)	59°22′50″N 27°16′56″E
Käva	open-pit	1925	1930	Riigi Põlevkivitööstus	59°21′43″N 27°14′48″E
Ubja	open-pit	1926	1955	Port Kunda (1941–1944); Punane Kunda (1944–1955)	
Pavandu	underground	1925	1927	Riigi Põlevkivitööstus	
Kiviõli	underground	1929	1987	Eesti Kiviõli (1929–1941); Baltische Öl (1941–1944); Eesti Põlevkivi (1944–1987)	59°21′02″N 26°56′23″E
Küttejõu	underground	1933	1951^{1}	Eesti Küttejõud (1933–1941); Baltische Öl (1941–1944); Eesti Põlevkivi (1944–1951)	59°20′19″N 26°59′09″E
Viivikonna	open-pit	1936	2000^{2}	Eestimaa Õlikonsortsium (1936–1941); Baltische Öl (1941–1944); Eesti Põlevkivi (1944–2000)	59°18′42″N 27°38′10″E
Kohtla	open-pit	1937	1959	New Consolidated Gold Fields Ltd. (1937–1941); Baltische Öl (1941–1944); Eesti Põlevkivi (1944–1959)	
Viivikonna	underground	1940	1954	Eestimaa Õlikonsortsium (1940–1941); Baltische Öl (1941–1944); Eesti Põlevkivi (1944–1954)	
Kohtla	underground	1940	1999	New Consolidated Gold Fields Ltd. (1940–1941); Baltische Öl (1941–1944); Eesti Põlevkivi (1944–1999)	59°21′03″N 27°10′23″E
Ahtme	underground	1948	2001	Eesti Põlevkivi	59°18′37″N 27°28′33″E
Sompa	underground	1948	1999	Eesti Põlevkivi	59°20′34″N 27°16′16″E
Sillamäe^{3}	underground	1949	1952	Sillamäe Processing Plant	59°24′21″N 27°43′22″E
Mine No. 2	underground	1949	1973	Eesti Põlevkivi	59°21′31″N 27°23′01″E
Tammiku	underground	1951	1999	Eesti Põlevkivi	59°20′18″N 27°23′37″E
Mine No. 4	underground	1953	1975	Eesti Põlevkivi	59°20′27″N 27°16′30″E
Sirgala	open-pit	1962	2000^{2}	Eesti Põlevkivi	59°16′53″N 27°42′57″E
Viru	underground	1965	2012	Eesti Põlevkivi (1965–2009); Enefit Kaevandused (2009–2012)	59°17′46″N 27°21′35″E
Narva	open-pit	1970	...^{4}	Eesti Põlevkivi (1970–2009); Enefit Kaevandused (2009–2021); Enefit Power (2021–...)	59°14′41″N 27°49′52″E
Estonia	underground	1972	...^{4}	Eesti Põlevkivi (1972–2009); Enefit Kaevandused (2009–2021); Enefit Power (2021–...)	59°12′16″N 27°23′11″E
Aidu	open-pit	1974	2012	Eesti Põlevkivi (1974–2009); Enefit Kaevandused (2009–2012)	59°19′17″N 27°06′04″E
Põhja-Kiviõli	open-pit	2004	...^{4}	Kiviõli Keemiatööstus	59°22′41″N 26°50′47″E
Ubja (new mine)	open-pit	2005	...^{4}	Kunda Nordic Tsement	59°25′28″N 26°25′42″E
Ojamaa	underground	2010	...^{4}	Viru Keemia Grupp	59°17′51″N 27°09′39″E
Notes: 1. Merged into the Kiviõli underground mine 2. Merged into the Narva open-pit 3. Mining of graptolitic argillite 4. Not closed, still operating

=== Electricity and heat generation ===
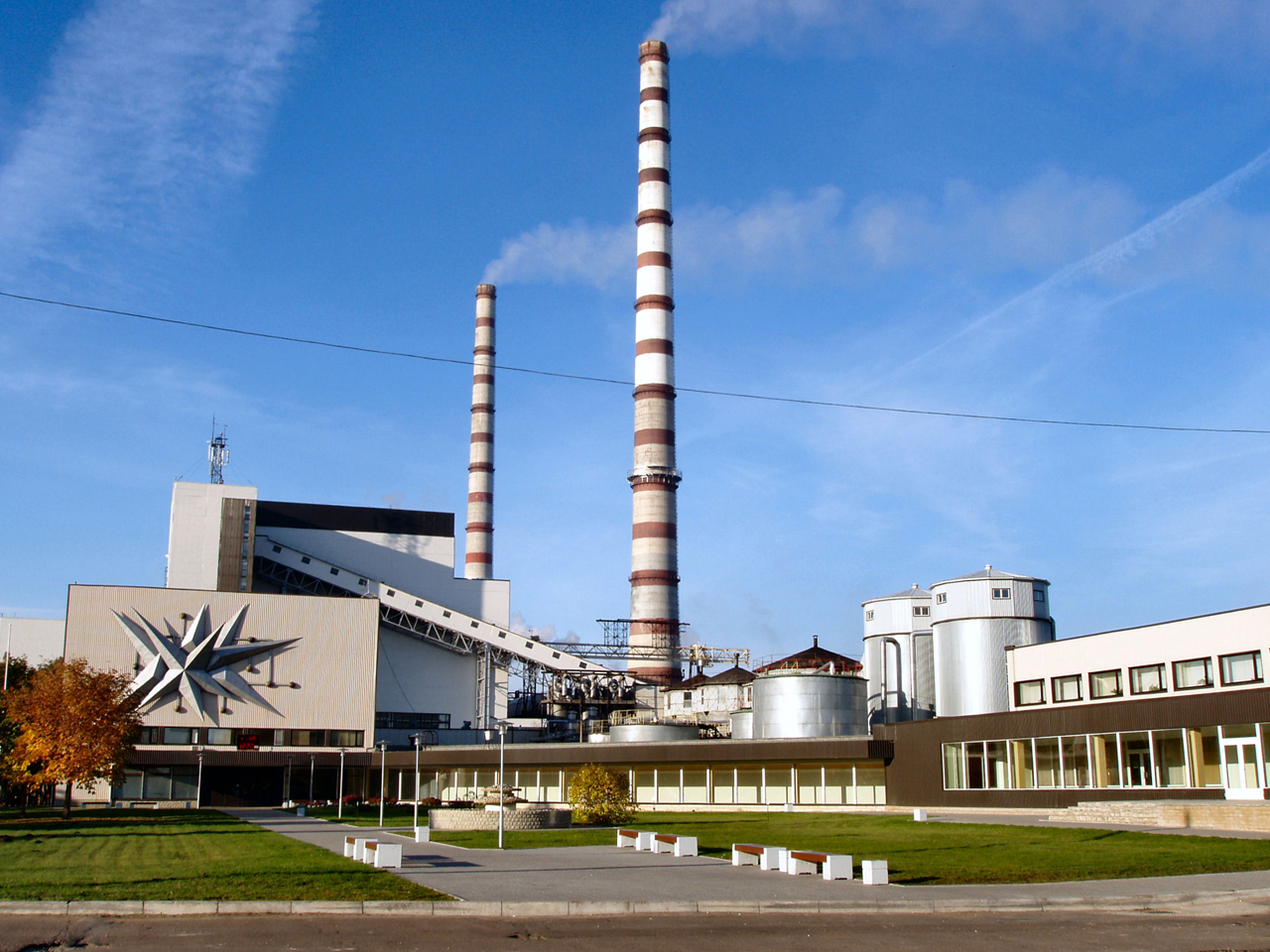
Eesti Power Station (2004)

In 2020, 2,225 GWh or 40.3% of Estonia's electricity was generated from oil shale and 748 GWh or 13.6% was generated from oil shale gas, which is a by-product of the shale oil generation. The share of oil shale in Estonia's electricity generation has decreased significantly over the last decade, and it is set to decrease even more due to the European Union's climate policy as well as the country's recognition of the environmental impact of oil shale-fired power stations and need to diversify the national energy balance. According to the International Energy Agency, Estonia should adopt the energy strategy in order to reduce the share of oil shale in the primary energy supply by improving the efficiency of shale-fired power stations and increasing the use of other energy sources such as renewable energy.

Eesti Energia owns the largest oil shale-fuelled power stations (Narva Power Stations) in the world. The increased carbon price has made oil-shale electricity less competitive and will affect it even more in the future. In June 2021, Eesti Energia announced it will stop burning oil shale for electricity generation by 2025 and burning oil shale gas by 2030. The government coalition of Estonia has decided that Estonia will stop oil shale power generation by 2035 at the latest.

Heat produced by co-generation at the Balti Power Station is used for district heating of Narva, the third largest city in Estonia with 58,700 inhabitants (2013). The co-generation plants in Kohtla-Järve, Sillamäe, and Kiviõli burn oil shale to produce electrical power and supply district heating to nearby towns. In addition to raw oil shale, the Kohtla-Järve Power Station uses oil shale gas, a by-product of shale oil production, for the same purposes.

Grid connected oil shale-fired power stations in Estonia
Power station	Opened	Closed	Max. installed electrical capacity (MWe)	Owner(s)	Coordinates
Tallinn	1924^{1}	1965^{2}	24	Tallinn City Council (1913–1941); Reichskommissariat Ostland (1942–1944); Eesti Energia (1945–1979)	59°26′40″N 24°45′02″E
Püssi	1937	1973	3.8	Virumaa Elektri AS (VEAS, 1937−1941); Reichskommissariat Ostland (1942–1944); Eesti Energia (1945–1973)	59°21′31″N 27°02′05″E
Kohtla-Järve^{3}	1949	...^{4}	48	Eesti Energia (1949–1996); Kohtla-Järve Soojus (1996–2011); VKG Energia (2011–...)	59°23′45″N 27°14′31″E
Ahtme	1951	2012	72.5	Eesti Energia (1949–1996); Kohtla-Järve Soojus (1996–2011); VKG Energia (2011–2012)	59°18′50″N 27°27′52″E
Sillamäe^{5}	1953^{1}	...^{4}	18	Sillamäe Processing Plant (1948–1990); Silmet (1990–1997); Sillamäe SEJ (1997–...)	59°24′13″N 27°44′41″E
Kiviõli	1959	...^{4}	10	Kiviõli Keemiatööstus (1944–1995); Kiviter (1995–1999); Kiviõli Keemiatööstus (1999–...)	59°21′13″N 26°56′16″E
Balti	1959	...^{4}	1,430	Eesti Energia	59°21′12″N 28°07′22″E
Eesti	1969	...^{4}	1,610	Eesti Energia	59°16′10″N 27°54′08″E
Auvere	2015^{6}	...^{4}	300	Eesti Energia	59°16′47″N 27°54′04″E
Notes: 1. Usage of oil shale started 2. Usage of oil shale ended 3. Uses oil shale and oil shale gas 4. Not closed, still operating 5. Uses natural gas in addition to oil shale 6. Test production, commissioned in 2018

=== Shale oil extraction ===
In 2008, Estonia was the second largest shale oil producer in the world after China. Production was 1.173 million tonnes of shale oil in 2019. About 99% of shale oil production was exported. In 2018, 34% of the mined oil shale was used for shale oil production.

There are three shale-oil producers in Estonia. In 2019, VKG Oil (a subsidiary of Viru Keemia Grupp) produced 637,000 tonnes of shale oil, Enefit Power (a subsidiary of Eesti Energia) produced 442,000 tonnes, and Kiviõli Keemiatööstus (a subsidiary of Alexela Energia) produced 94,000 tonnes. Two processes – the Kiviter process and the Galoter process – are in use for shale oil extraction. Enefit uses the Galoter process while VKG Oil and Kiviõli Keemiatööstus use both – Kiviter and Galoter processes.

Shale oil extraction plants in Estonia
Plant	Opened	Closed	Technology	Owner(s)
Kohtla-Järve	1921	...^{1}	Pintsch's generator/Kiviter retor (1921–...)^{1} Tunnel oven (1955–1968); Chamber retort (1947–1987); Galoter retort (2009–...)^{1}	Riigi Põlevkivitööstus (1918–1927); Esimene Eesti Põlevkivitööstus (1936–1941); Baltische Öl (1941–1944); Kohtla-Järve Oil Shale Processing Plant (1944–1993); Kiviter (1993–1999); VKG Oil (1999–...)
Vanamõisa	1925	1931	Fusion retort	Estonian Oil Development Syndicate Ltd. (1925–1930); Vanamõisa Oilfields Ltd. (1930–1931)
Sillamäe	1928	1944	Tunnel oven	Eestimaa Õlikonsortsium (1925–1941); Baltische Öl (1941–1944)
Kiviõli	1929	...^{1}	Tunnel oven (1929–1975); Kiviter retort (1953–...)^{1} Galoter retort (1953–1981, 2006–...)^{1}	Eesti Kiviõli (1929–1941); Baltische Öl (1941–1944); Kiviõli Keemiatööstus (1944–1995); Kiviter (1995–1999); Kiviõli Keemiatööstus (1999–...)
Kohtla	1931	1961	Davidson's retort	New Consolidated Gold Fields Ltd. (1931–1941); Baltische Öl (1941–1944); Kohtla Oil Shale Combinate (1944–1961)
Narva	1980	...^{1}	Galoter retort^{1}	Eesti Energia/Eesti Energia Õlitööstus
Note: 1. Not closed, still operating

The government coalition of Estonia has decided that Estonia will stop shale oil extraction by 2040 at the latest.

The International Energy Agency's (IEA) 2023 energy policy review for Estonia highlights the nation's shift towards renewables, emphasizing reduced reliance on oil shale and the development of wind, photovoltaic (PV), and biomass. Estonia aims for climate neutrality by 2050 and 100% renewable electricity by 2030.

== Environmental impact ==
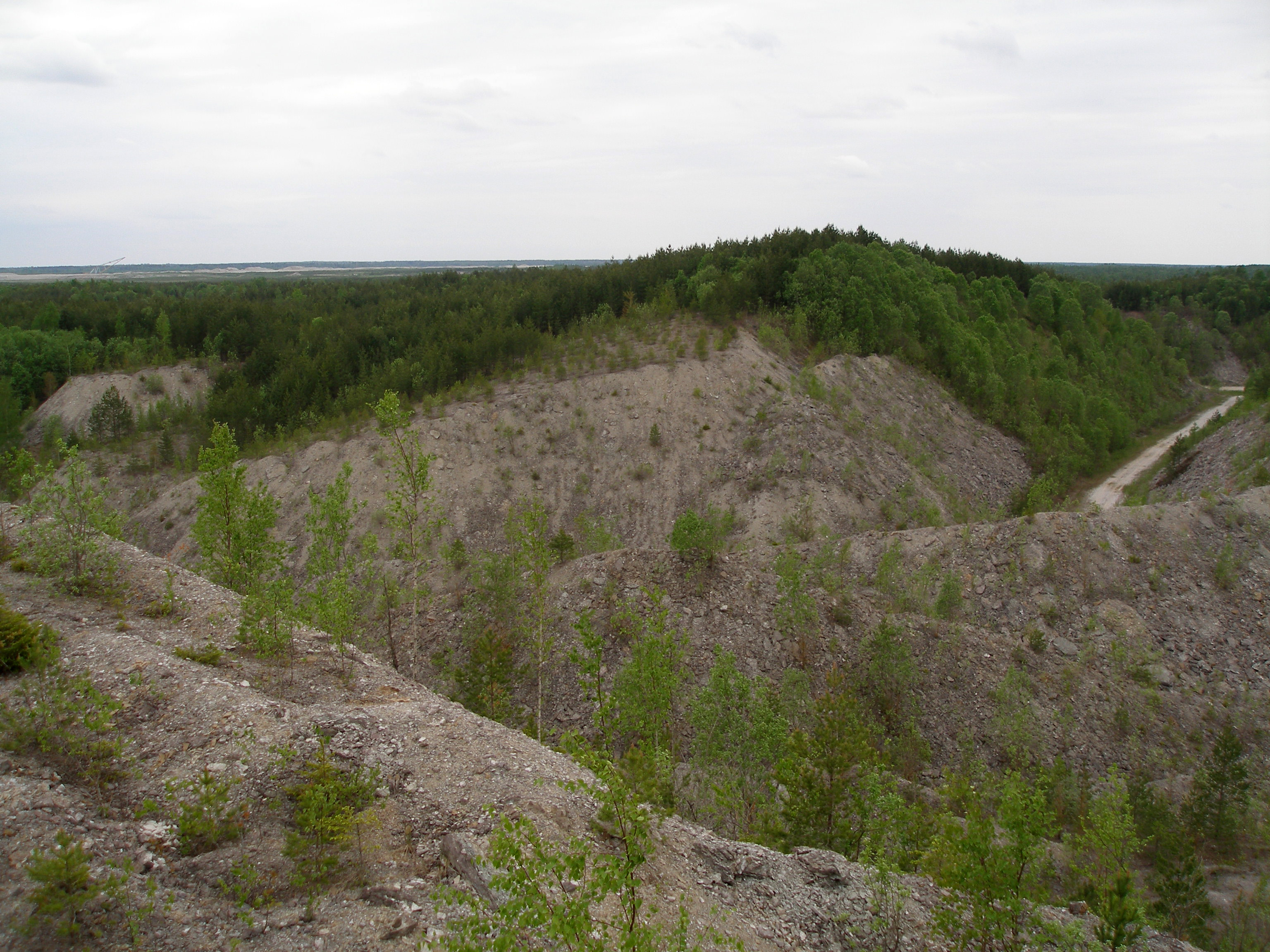
Unrehabilitated land at the Aidu open-pit mine (2007)

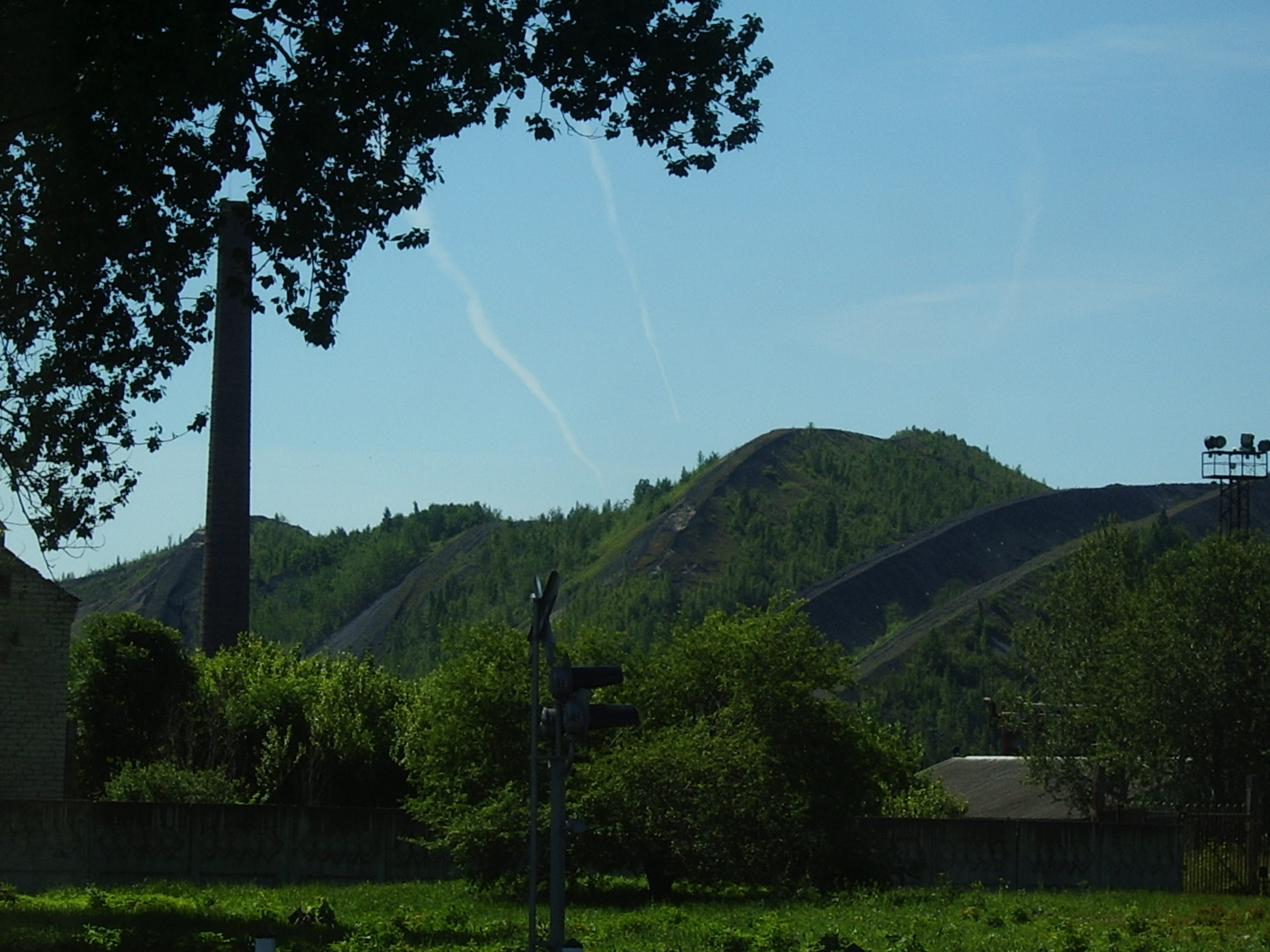
An old semi-coke heap in Kohtla-Järve (2005)

=== Wastes and land usage ===
The mining and processing of about one billion tonnes of oil shale in Estonia has created about 360-370 million tonnes of solid waste. Combustion ashes are the largest component (200 million tonnes), followed by mining waste (90 million tonnes) and spent shale (mainly semi-coke, 70–80 million tonnes). In addition, approximately 73 million tonnes of graptolitic argillite as overlying deposit were mined and piled in waste heaps in the process of phosphorite–ore mining near Maardu in 1964–1991.

The oil shale waste heaps pose a spontaneous ignition risk due to their remaining organic content. The waste material, particularly semi-coke, contains pollutants including sulphates, heavy metals, and polycyclic aromatic hydrocarbons (PAHs), some of which are toxic and carcinogenic.

As a result of decades of mining activity, the topography of the oil shale region has changed; this includes a greater range of altitudes within the mined area. Former and current oil shale mines occupy about 1% of Estonia's territory. About 500 square kilometres (190 sq mi) or 15% of Ida-Viru County's territory is out of use due to open-pit mines and waste landfills; an additional 150 square kilometres (58 sq mi) has sunk or become unstable due to underground mining. Semi-coke heaps near Kohtla-Järve and Kiviõli cover more than 180–200 hectares (440–490 acres) and ash heaps near Narva cover more than 210 hectares (520 acres). These heaps protruding from the flat landscape are regarded as landmarks and as monuments to the area's industrial heritage.

There is less biodiversity within the mined area; in particular, the reclaimed and reforested areas have less biodiversity than the areas which have undergone a natural succession.

=== Water usage and pollution ===
Surface water flows into mines and accumulates along with groundwater. This water must be pumped out in order for mining to proceed. The water that is pumped from the mines and the coolant water used by oil shale-fired power stations combined exceeds 90% of all water used in Estonia. For each cubic meter of oil shale mined in Estonia, 14–18 cubic metres (490–640 cu ft) of water must be pumped from the mines, amounting to about 227 million cubic metres (184,000 acre⋅ft) that are pumped from mines annually. Groundwater comprises 64% of the water pumped from underground mines annually and 24% of that pumped from open-pit mines. This alters both the circulation and quality of the groundwater, lowers groundwater levels, and releases mine water into surface water bodies such as rivers and lakes. Mining activities have contributed to lower water levels in 24 out of the 39 lakes in the Kurtna Lake District. The release of mine water into the environment has changed the natural movement of surface water. As a result of mining activities, groundwater moves towards the excavation cavities. A 220-kilometre (85-square-mile) underground water body that holds over 170 million cubic metres (140,000 acre⋅ft) of water has formed in eight abandoned underground mines: Ahtme, Kohtla, Kukruse, Käva, Sompa, Tammiku, No.2 and No.4.

The process of pumping water from the mines introduces oxygen via aeration, thereby oxidising the rock's pyrite. Pyrite contains sulfur, and one consequence of its oxidation is the introduction of significant amounts of sulphates into mine water. This has had a negative impact on water quality in five lakes in the Kurtna Lake District. In some lakes, sulphate levels have increased tens of times compared to the pre-mining period. Suspended mineral matter in the mine water pumped into these lakes has changed the composition of the lakes' sediments. However, it has been found that this disturbance diminishes over time; studies show that sulphates and iron in mining water decrease to levels that meet drinking water quality standards about five years after mine closure.

The process and waste waters used in shale oil extraction contain phenols, tar, and several other environmentally toxic products. Power stations use water as a coolant and for hydraulic transportation of oil shale ash to the ash heaps. Narva power stations use 1,306 million cubic metres (1,059,000 acre⋅ft) of water from the Narva River annually for cooling. For ash transportation, generated oil shale ash is mixed with water at a ratio of 1:20 and the resulted mixture, known as "ash pulp", is pumped to the heaps. Consequently, the transportation water becomes highly alkaline. The total volume of formed alkaline water is 19 million cubic metres (15,000 acre⋅ft).

Another source of water pollution is aqueous leachates from oil shale ash and spent shale. About 800,000 to 1,200,000 cubic metres (650 to 970 acre⋅ft) of toxic leachate from the Narva ash heaps inflows annually to the Narva River and further to the Gulf of Finland. Before the closure of old semi-coke heaps in Kohtla-Järve and Kiviõli, an additional 500,000 cubic metres (410 acre⋅ft) of leachates reached via the Kohtla and Purtse rivers to the Baltic Sea annually. The toxicity of leachate is mainly caused by the alkalinity and sulphides; leachate also includes chlorides, oil products, heavy metals, and PAHs which are carcinogenic.

=== Air emissions ===
Oil shale-fired power stations pollute air with the fly ash and flue gases like carbon dioxide (CO_{2}), nitrogen oxides (NO_{x}), sulfur dioxide (SO_{2}), and hydrogen chloride (HCl). In addition to Estonia, this pollution also affects Finland and Russia. The industry emits into the atmosphere annually about 200,000 tonnes of fly-ash, including heavy metals, carbonates, alkaline oxides (mainly calcium oxide (CaO)), and harmful organic substances (including PAHs). About 30% of the fly-ash is CaO, a portion of which is neutralised by atmospheric CO_{2}. Alkaline fly ash has raised the pH value of lake and bog water. This has caused the invasion of eutrophic plants in the area of the oil shale industry, leading to the degradation of those waterbodies. Another source of air pollution is the dust that arises during deposition of oil shale ash and semi-coke.

According to a 2001 study, the concentration of particulate matter in the fly-ash is 39.7 mg per cubic metre. The most hazardous particles are those with a diameter of less than 2.5 micrometres (9.8×10^{−5} in); these particles are associated with an increase in cardiovascular mortality and premature deaths in Estonia.

The combustion of oil shale releases more CO_{2} into the atmosphere than any other primary fuel. Generating 1 MWh of electricity in modern oil shale-fired boilers creates 0.9–1 tonnes of CO_{2}. In 2017, oil-shale related greenhouse gas emissions in Estonia accounted for 12.9 million tonnes or 69.1% of total energy-related emissions. Of the all energy-related CO_{2} emissions, heat and power generation accounted for 76%. According to the OECD, CO_{2} emissions in Estonia could be reduced by two-thirds if oil shale would be used for production of lighter oil products, instead of burning to generate electricity.

=== Mitigation ===
Various efforts have reduced the industry's environmental impact. Fluidised bed combustion generates fewer NO_{x}, SO_{2}, and fly-ash emissions, including PAHs, than the earlier technologies that burned pulverised oil shale. Reclamation and reforestation of exhausted mining areas have been carried out since the 1970s. In 2010–2013, a €38 million project was implemented for the environmentally safe closing of 86 hectares (210 acres) of semi-coke and ash heaps. In accordance with a European Union waste framework directive, the heaps were covered with waterproof material, new topsoil, and sod. In Kiviõli, a 90-metre (300 ft) semi-coke heap, the highest artificial hill in the Baltic countries, was converted into a ski centre. The former Aidu open-pit mine was converted into a rowing course. A part of the former Sirgala open pit mine has been used as a military training area.

An oil shale sector health impact study conducted in 2014–2015 show that the residents of the region complained significantly more frequently about tightness, long-term cough, phlegm in the lungs, wheezing and cardiovascular diseases, hypertension, stroke, diabetes and stenocardia. The study also shows that the rate of lung cancer among men in the region was higher compared to the Estonian average.

== See also ==
- Energy in Estonia
- Geology of Estonia

== Bibliography ==
- Aaloe, Aasa; Bauert, Heikki; Soesoo, Alvar (2007). Kukersite oil shale (PDF). Tallinn: GEOGuide Baltoscandia. ISBN 978-9985-9834-2-3. Archived from the original (PDF) on 15 December 2017.
- Arad, Y.; Gutman, Y.; Margaliot, A. (2014). Documents on the Holocaust: Selected Sources on the Destruction of the Jews of Germany and Austria, Poland, and the Soviet Union. Elsevier. ISBN 978-1483-2990-8-2.
- Beger, Mariliis, ed. (2019). Estonian Oil Shale Industry Yearbook 2018 (PDF). Eesti Energia, VKG, KKT, Tallinn University of Technology.
- National Development Plan for the Use of Oil Shale 2016–2030 (PDF). Ministry of Environment. 2016.
- Dyni, John R. (2006). Geology and resources of some world oil-shale deposits. Scientific Investigations Report 2005–5294 (PDF) (Report). United States Department of the Interior, United States Geological Survey.
- Dyni, John R. (2010). "Oil Shale". In Clarke, Alan W.; Trinnaman, Judy A. (eds.). Survey of energy resources (PDF) (22 ed.). World Energy Council. ISBN 978-0-946121-02-1.
- Estonian International Commission for the Investigation of Crimes Against Humanity (2006). Kiho, Toomas (ed.). Estonia, 1940–1945: Reports of the Estonian International Commission for the Investigation of Crimes Against Humanity. Estonian Foundation for the Investigation of Crimes Against Humanity. ISBN 978-9949-1304-0-5.
- Francu, Juraj; Harvie, Barbra; Laenen, Ben; Siirde, Andres; Veiderma, Mihkel (May 2007). A study on the EU oil shale industry viewed in the light of the Estonian experience (PDF). A report by EASAC to the Committee on Industry, Research and Energy of the European Parliament. European Academies Science Advisory Council.
- Holmberg, Rurik (2008). Survival of the Unfit. Path Dependence and the Estonian Oil Shale Industry. Linköping Studies in Arts and Science. Vol. 427. Linköping University.
- IEA (2013). Estonia 2013. Energy Policies Beyond IEA Countries. doi:10.1787/9789264190801-en. ISBN 978-92-6419079-5. ISSN 2307-0897.
- IEA (2019). Estonia 2019 Review. Energy Policies of IEA Countries. doi:10.1787/2b39ebd1-en. ISBN 978-92-64-59729-7. S2CID 243252263.
- OECD (2001). OECD Reviews of Foreign Direct Investment: Estonia. Vol. 8. doi:10.1787/9789264194953-en. ISBN 978-92-64-19521-9.
- OECD (2015). OECD Economic Surveys: Estonia. doi:10.1787/eco_surveys-est-2015-en. ISBN 978-92-64-22722-4. ISSN 0376-6438.
- Oone, Annely, ed. (2020). Estonian Oil Shale Industry Yearbook 2019 (PDF). Eesti Energia, VKG, Tallinn University of Technology.
- Ots, Arvo (2006) [2004]. Tyson, Toni; McQuillen, Mary (eds.). Oil Shale Fuel Combustion. Tallinn: Arvo Ots; Eesti Energia. ISBN 978-9949-13-710-7.
- Saarnak, Martin; Uibopuu, Lembit; Valgma, Ingo; Nurme, Martin; Väizene, Vivika (2014). "6. Eesti põlevkivi kaevandamisviisid" [6. Mining methods of Estonian oil shale] (PDF). In Valgma, Ingo (ed.). Mäendus [Mining] (in Estonian). Institute of Mining. Tallinn University of Technology. pp. 55–68. ISBN 978-9949-430-80-2. Archived from the original (PDF) on 20 May 2018.
