= Geology of Estonia =

The geology of Estonia is the study of rocks, minerals, water, landforms and geologic history in Estonia. The crust is part of the East European Craton and formed beginning in the Paleoproterozoic nearly two billion years ago. Shallow marine environments predominated in Estonia, producing extensive natural resources from organic matter such as oil shale and phosphorite. The Mesozoic and much of the Cenozoic are not well-preserved in the rock record, although the glaciations during the Pleistocene buried deep valleys in sediment, rechanneled streams and left a landscape of extensive lakes and peat bogs.

== Stratigraphy, tectonics and geologic history ==
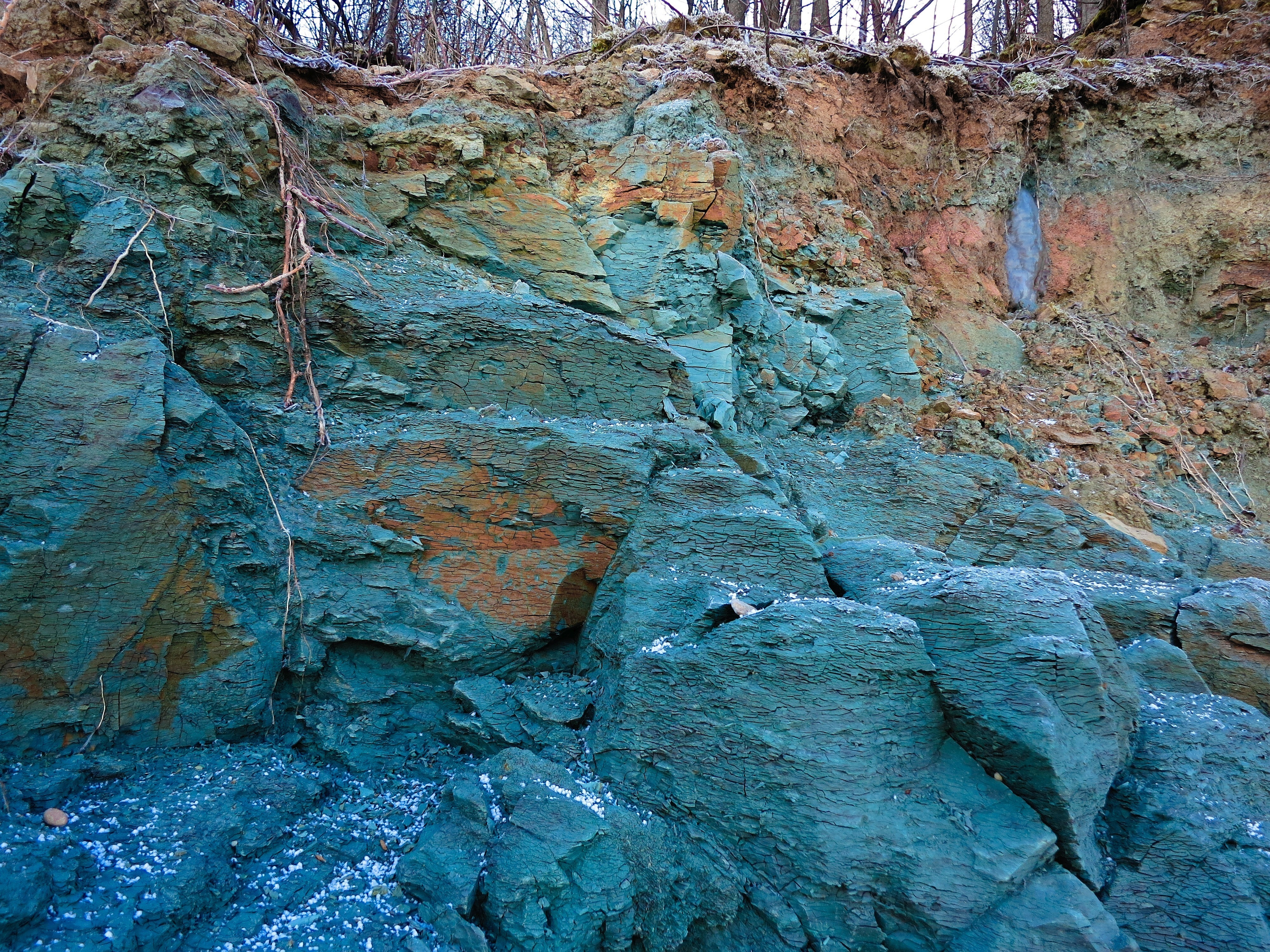
Cambrian blue clay outcrop at beach of Gulf of Finland in Voka

Estonia is part of the East European Craton, with an average continental crust thickness between 40 and 64 kilometers. The crust consolidated during the Svecofennian Orogeny in the late Paleoproterozoic, nearly two billion years ago.

The contact between the crystalline basement and overlying rock dips gently to the south. Late Proterozoic and early and middle Paleozoic sedimentary rocks on the north coast of Estonia are 100 to 200 meters thick, reaching up to 500 to 800 meters thick in the Gulf of Riga and the southeast. The Baltic Syncline and Moscow Syncline are deeply buried structures within the Russian Platform, with three to five kilometers of sediments. They are linked by the Latvian Saddle, which is shallower with two kilometers of sediment. Precambrian rocks do not outcrop anywhere in Estonia, but are present in the subsurface.

=== Paleozoic (539–251 million years ago) ===
Except for artificial outcrops in oil shale and phosphorite strip mines, the only outcrops of Paleozoic rocks are found in a few river valleys, coastal cliffs on the Baltic and the shores of lake Võrtsjärv and Peipsi.

During the Ordovician and Silurian, a shallow marine environment predominated in Estonia, depositing organic-rich black carbonate shale which later generated oil shale. Reef limestones and backreef dolomite contributed material to the carbonaceous shale. Silurian sedimentation took place during a retreat in sea levels, bringing a break in sediment deposition.

In the Early Devonian, sedimentation continued. The Old Red sandstones deposited in the Middle Devonian in a nearshore marine environment from sand and silt, shed during the Caledonian orogeny onto the Fennoscandian continental plain. A few carbonate rocks capped the Devonian in the southeast.

The sedimentary rocks preserve extensive fossils and tens of thousands of specimens have been gathered at the University of Tartu and Institute of Geology. Brachiopod, mollusk, trilobite, ostracod, bryozoan, graptolite and stromatoporoid fossils are especially common. Most natural resources in Estonia formed from fossil remains, including kukersite and phosphorite deposits formed from shells.

Through the Devonian, the continent Baltica, which included Estonia, drifted from the South Pole to north of the Equator and was influenced by glacier-related changes in sea level. Deformation of rocks from weak, regional tectonic stresses leads to some anticline folds and fluid migration in the rocks, which generate metasomatic dolomite limestone, zinc mineralization and lead-sulfide deposits. The Kärdla astrobleme on Hiiumaa Island formed from an asteroid impact 455 million years ago, and Estonia has three other small meteorite craters, less than 110 meters in diameters in the bedrock.

=== Mesozoic-Cenozoic (251 million years ago to present) ===
The Mesozoic and much of the Cenozoic are poorly attested in Estonia. However, extensive sediments and landforms remain from the last 2.5 million years of the Quaternary.

A thin blanket of Quaternary sediments covers the plains of western Estonia. The Baltic Sea and Gulf of Finland are relatively deep erosional features in the bedrock, as are the lake basins of Vortsjarv and Peipsi, which were deepened by glaciers during the Pleistocene. Before and in-between glaciations, a network of deep valleys formed, up to 145 meters below sea levels, connecting the Baltic and the Gulf of Finland. However, more recent sedimentation has disguised old valleys which do not appear as a major part of present-day topography.

Glacial debris is less than five meters thick in northern Estonia and parts of the country underlain by limestone and dolomite have karst processes and hardly any remnants of glaciation. The Haanja Heights and Otepää Heights have up to 100 meters of glacial sediment, or up to 207 meters in the Abja Valley in the south. Quaternary geologists define five major till layers, separated by interglacial pollen assemblages.

Moraines are often up to tens of kilometers long and more than 50 meters in height, such as the Lääne-Saaremaa terminal moraine. Kame fields and eskers are also common, particularly on the Pandivere Upland and the West Estonian Lowland. Glacial retreat began around 13,000 years ago and ended by around 11,000 years ago. However, ice-dammed lakes and isostatic rebound in the region played an important role in geomorphology for several more millennia. The Baltic Ice Lake gave way to the Yoldia Sea, Ancylus Lake and Littorina Sea, followed by the Limnea Sea. The land of Estonia rose 65 meters in a span of only 2450 years and has risen an additional 50 meters in the past 10,000 years.

Deglaciation led to the formation of river valleys and 20 to 40 percent of downcutting in rivers in the south happened during a short span after glaciation. Estonia has 1500 lakes and 20,000 peat bogs, although the number of lakes was three times as many at the start of the Holocene.

== Natural resource geology ==
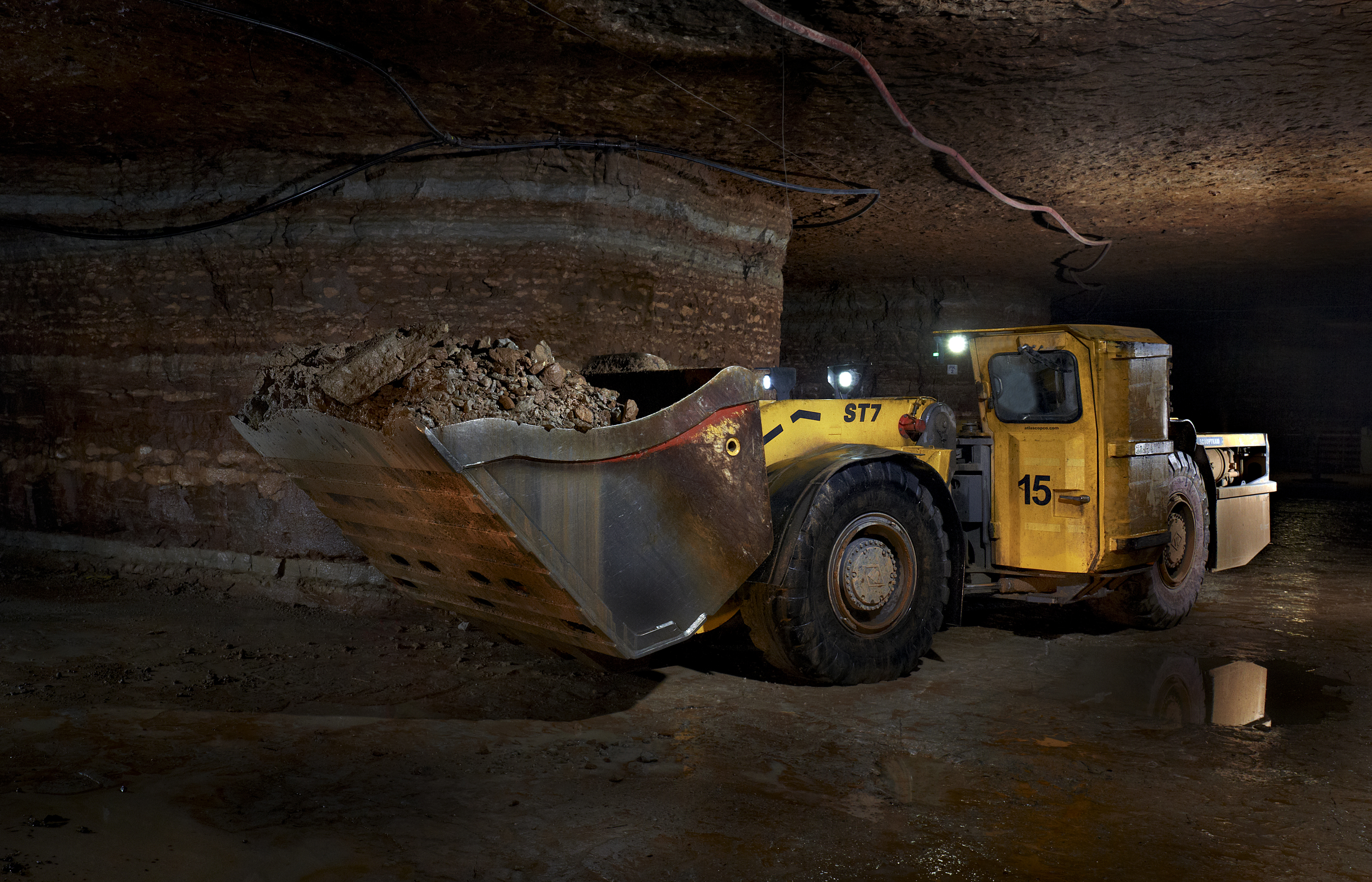
VKG Ojamaa mine for oil shale extraction, using an Atlas Copco Scooptram ST7 underground loader

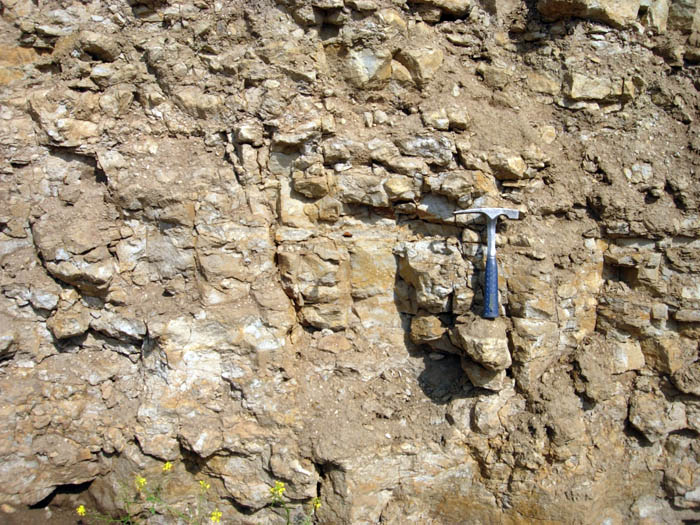
Outcrop of Ordovician oil shale (kukersite), northern Estonia

Oil shale in Estonia remains a major part of the economy and throughout the 1950s, '60s, '70s, '80s and early '90s, geologists extensively prospected oil shale resources, with peak production in 1980. Phosphorite mining was also an important activity in Estonia through the 1980s, prompting the so-called Phosphorite War in 1987 when the Estonian public opposed the expansion of mining efforts, and the implicit threat of additional Russian miners being sent to the region. The major phosphorite mine at Maardu closed in 1991 due to its environmental impact.

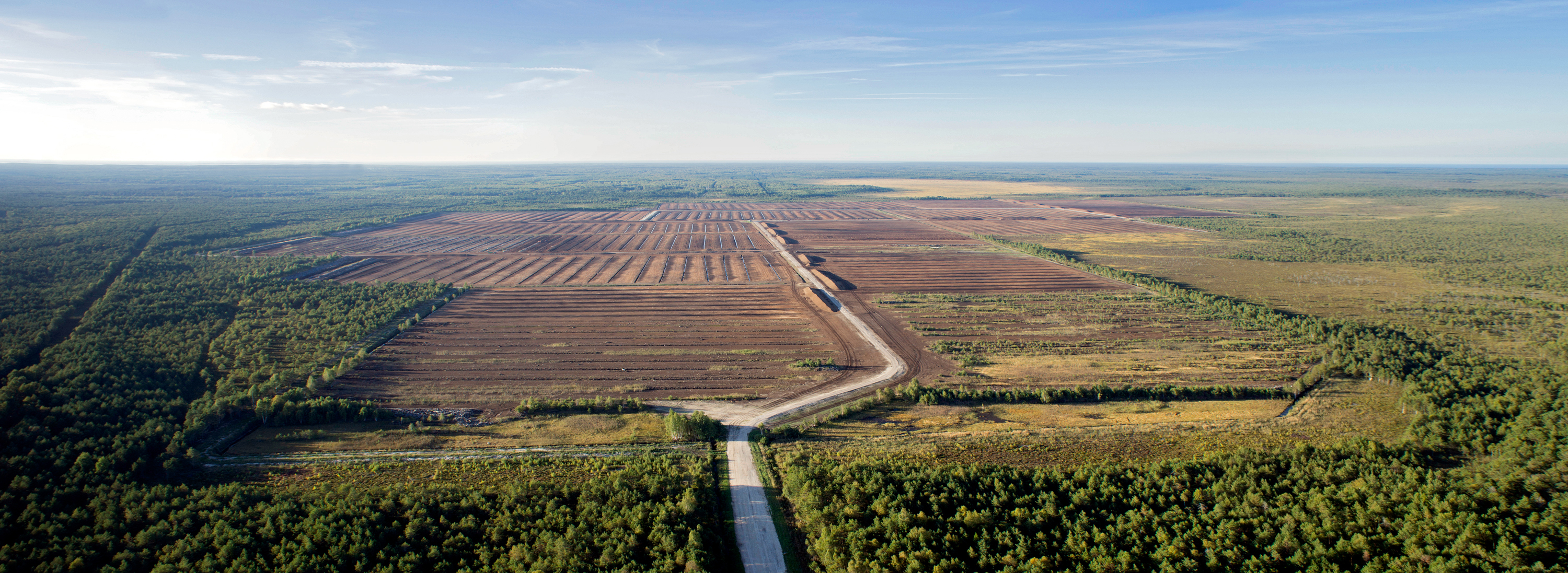
Peat extraction in Hiiumaa, September, 2013

Estonia has 165,000 mires (including 20,000 peat bogs), each with an area of one hectare or greater. About 1500 are commercially important and most have thicknesses of three to seven meters, with a maximum of 16.7 meters in the Haanja Heights. Lake chalk is sometimes used to neutralize high acidity and for art material. Estonia also has iron ore in the crystalline basement, pyrite and glauconite, as well as lead and zinc sulfide ore. Granite rock near Tallinn is often extracted for road work.

Estonia also has extensive clays dating to the Cambrian, Devonian and Quaternary, which are widely used in ceramics and cement. Limestone is also used as a raw material for the chemical, pulp, paper, building stone and glass industries, while dolomite is sometimes used for facing stones. Gyttja lake mud occurs in 121 lakes, with up to three billion cubic meters of reserves and a large deposit of 45 million tons at Varska. Lake mud can be used for medical purposes, or in fertilizers.

== History of geologic research ==
Estonian geologists have developed The Book of Primeval Nature, chronicling landforms in the country. The Kaali meteorite crater on Saaremaa Island was the first geologic site slated for protection after its recognition in 1937.

The Institute of Geology of the Academy of Sciences was organized in 1947, followed by the founding of the Geological Survey of Estonia and the Institute of Geology in 1957. Since the 1950s, Estonian organizations drilled tens of thousands of boreholes through the sedimentary cover, in some cases reaching more than 500 meters deep into the crystalline basement rock.

The Geological Survey of Estonia completed mapping of Paleozoic bedrock and Quaternary sediments by 1975. Additional maps of hydrogeology, geomorphology, engineering geology and even geoecology have been completed since then. Up until 1990, all geologic publications were written in Russian.
