= Eesti Küttejõud =

Company based in Estonia

- Company type: Private limited company
- Industry: Mining
- Founded: 1922
- Founder: Union of Estonian Industrialists
- Defunct: 1940
- Fate: Nationalized
- Headquarters: Küttejõu, Estonia
- Key people: Emil Kuhi (Chairman)
- Products: Oil shale
- Production output: 126,238 tonnes of oil shale (1939)
- Owner: Põhja paberi- ja puupapivabrik
- Number of employees: 250

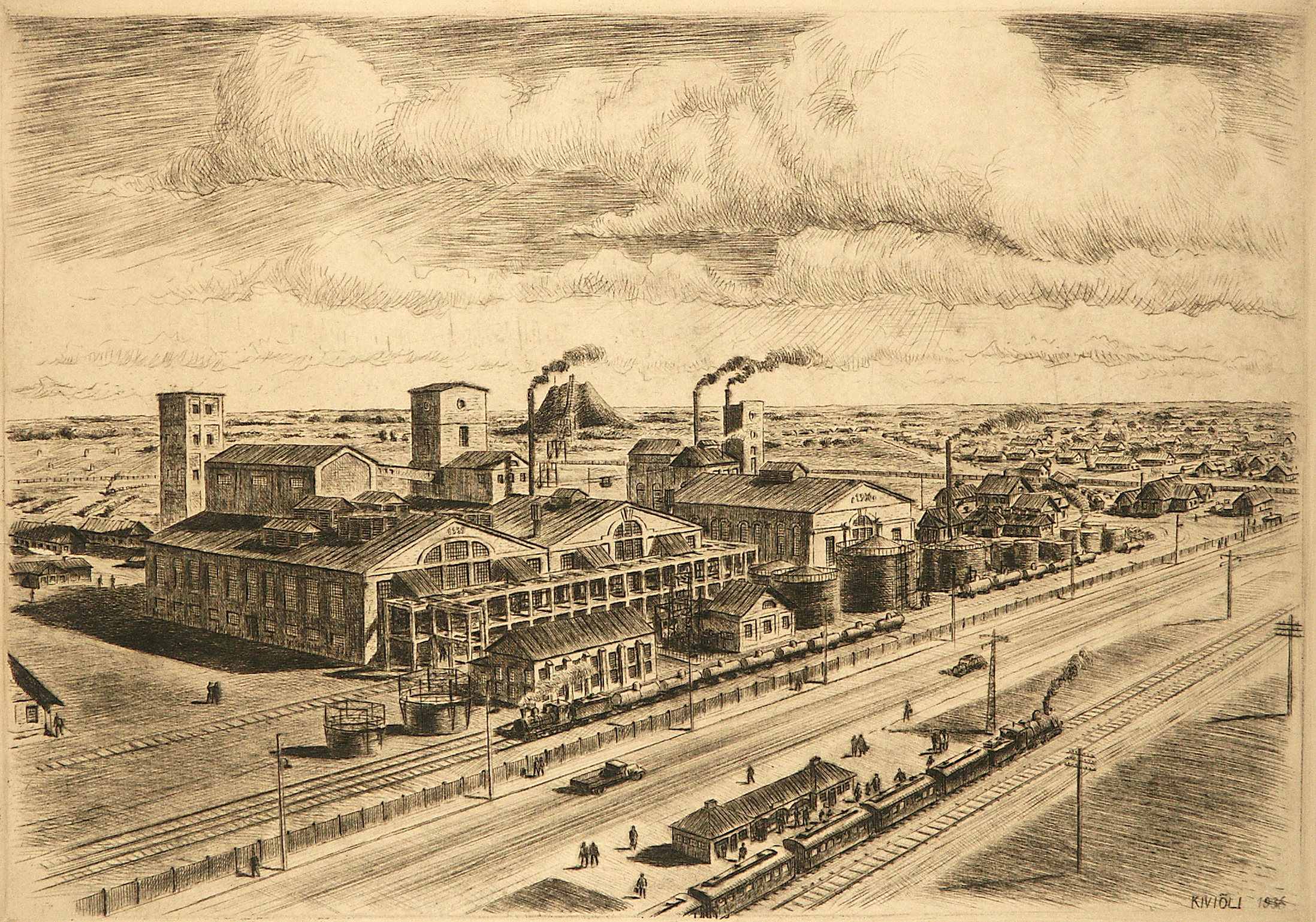
Illustration of the company's oil factory from 1936.

AS Eesti Küttejõud (also: AS Eesti Kütte-Jõud; commonly: Küttejõud; literally: Estonian Heating Power) was an oil shale company located in Küttejõu, Estonia. The Küttejõu township, now district of Kiviõli, is named after the company.

Eesti Küttejõud was established in 1922 by the Union of Estonian Industrialists. It was as the first private oil shale mining company. In 1925, the Tallinn pulp factory Põhja paberi- ja puupapivabrik (English: Nordic Paper and Woodboard Mill) acquired the company. At the same year, the Küttejõu open-pit mine was opened. Unlike other that time oil shale companies in Estonia, it did not have any shale oil extraction but only mining operations. It sold mined oil shale directly for heating fuel to the paper mill and power plants.

In 1939, the company produced 126,238 tonnes of oil shale. After occupation of Estonia by the Soviet Union, the company was nationalized in 1940.

== See also ==
- Eesti Kiviõli
- Eestimaa Õlikonsortsium
- Esimene Eesti Põlevkivitööstus
- New Consolidated Gold Fields
- Oil shale in Estonia

== Bibliography ==
- EPA Oil Shale Research Group (1979). EPA program status report, oil shale. Interagency energy-environment research and development program report.
- Holmberg, Rurik (2008). Survival of the Unfit. Path Dependence and the Estonian Oil Shale Industry (PDF). Linköping Studies in Arts and Science. Vol. 427. Linköping University.
- Ots, Arvo (2006) [2004]. Toni Tyson; Mary McQuillen (eds.). Oil Shale Fuel Combustion. Tallinn: Arv Ots; Eesti Energia. ISBN 978-9949-13-710-7.
