= Eestimaa Õlikonsortsium =

Company based in Estonia

- Company type: Private limited company
- Industry: Oil and gas
- Founded: 1926
- Defunct: 1940
- Fate: Nationalized
- Successor: Baltic Oil Company; Silmet
- Headquarters: Sillamäe, Estonia
- Key people: Mathias Westerblom (Director)
- Products: Shale oil
- Production output: 36,944 tonnes of shale oil (1939)
- Owner: Marcus Wallenberg
- Number of employees: 870 (1938)

Eestimaa Õlikonsortsium (Swedish: Estländska Oljeskifferkonsortiet; English: Estonian Oil Consortium) was an oil shale company located in Sillamäe, Estonia. The company was established in 1926. It was a Swedish–Norwegian consortium controlled by Marcus Wallenberg. Main shareholders were Investor AB, AB Emissionsinstitutet, and Norsk Hydro.

The consortium built a tunnel oven in 1928. However, due to recession, production halted in 1930 and was not restarted until 1936, when it was reorganized as Baltic Oil Company. A second tunnel oven was added in 1938. In 1936, it produced 15,000 tonnes of oil, including 2,400 tonnes of gasoline.

In July 1938, Eestimaa Õlikonsortsium concluded a contract with the German Kriegsmarine to supply shale oil as a ship fuel. In 1939, it produced 36,944 tonnes of shale oil. After occupation of Estonia by the Soviet Union, the company was nationalized in 1940. According to Soviet-Swedish agreement of 1941, the Soviet Union made a one-time payment in 1947, covering only part of the company's value.

== See also ==
- Eesti Kiviõli
- Eesti Küttejõud
- Esimene Eesti Põlevkivitööstus
- New Consolidated Gold Fields
- Oil shale in Estonia

== Bibliography ==
- Holmberg, Rurik (2008). Survival of the Unfit. Path Dependence and the Estonian Oil Shale Industry (PDF). Linköping Studies in Arts and Science. Vol. 427. Linköping University.
