= New Consolidated Gold Fields =

Company based in Estonia

New Consolidated Gold Fields Ltd. Estonian Branch
- Company type: Private limited company
- Industry: Oil and gas
- Founded: 1930
- Defunct: 1940
- Fate: Nationalized
- Headquarters: Kohtla-Nõmme, Estonia
- Key people: William Dunn (Chairman)
- Products: Shale oil
- Production output: 11,400 tonnes of shale oil (1939)
- Parent: Consolidated Gold Fields
- Subsidiaries: Trustivapaa Bensiini

New Consolidated Gold Fields Ltd Estonian Branch (commonly known as Goldfields) was an oil shale company located in Kohtla-Nõmme, Estonia. It was a subsidiary of Consolidated Gold Fields.

== History ==
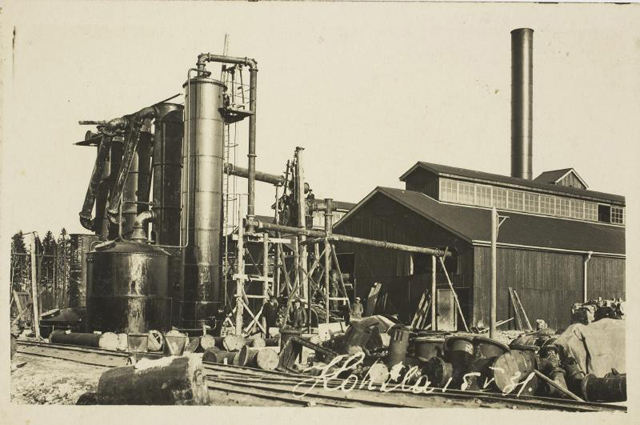
Kohtla shale oil extraction plant of New Consolidated Gold Fields Ltd.

New Consolidated Gold Fields began oil shale research and development in the late 1920s in England. In 1930 it began construction of the shale oil extraction complex at Kohtla-Nõmme. It consisted of a shale oil extraction plant, a crushing mill, laboratory, power plant, office building and services facilities, as also housing for 30 workers, dispensary and sauna. The first plant was built in 1931. The plant was equipped with eight rotating retorts (Davidson retorts). Each of these retorts was capable of processing 15 tonnes of oil shale per day. This facility continued to operate until 1961. In 1934 the company doubled its production by building the second shale oil extraction plant.

In 1934, Eesti Kiviõli and New Consolidated Gold Fields established the service station chain Trustivapaa Bensiini (now: Teboil) in Finland. During 1940 this chain sold more shale-oil-derived gasoline than did the entire conventional gasoline market in Estonia. In 1937, the company opened the Kohtla underground mine.

After the occupation of Estonia by the Soviet Union, the company was nationalized in 1940. The Kohtla-Nõmme shale oil extraction complex continued to operate until 1961. The underground mine stayed operational until 2001.

== See also ==
- Eesti Küttejõud
- Eestimaa Õlikonsortsium
- Esimene Eesti Põlevkivitööstus
- Oil shale in Estonia

== Bibliography ==
- EPA Oil Shale Research Group (1979). EPA program status report, oil shale. Interagency energy-environment research and development program report.
- Holmberg, Rurik (2008). Survival of the Unfit. Path Dependence and the Estonian Oil Shale Industry (PDF). Linköping Studies in Arts and Science. Vol. 427. Linköping University.
- Ots, Arvo (2006) [2004]. Toni Tyson; Mary McQuillen (eds.). Oil Shale Fuel Combustion. Tallinn: Arv Ots; Eesti Energia. ISBN 978-9949-13-710-7.
