= Esimene Eesti Põlevkivitööstus =

Company based in Estonia

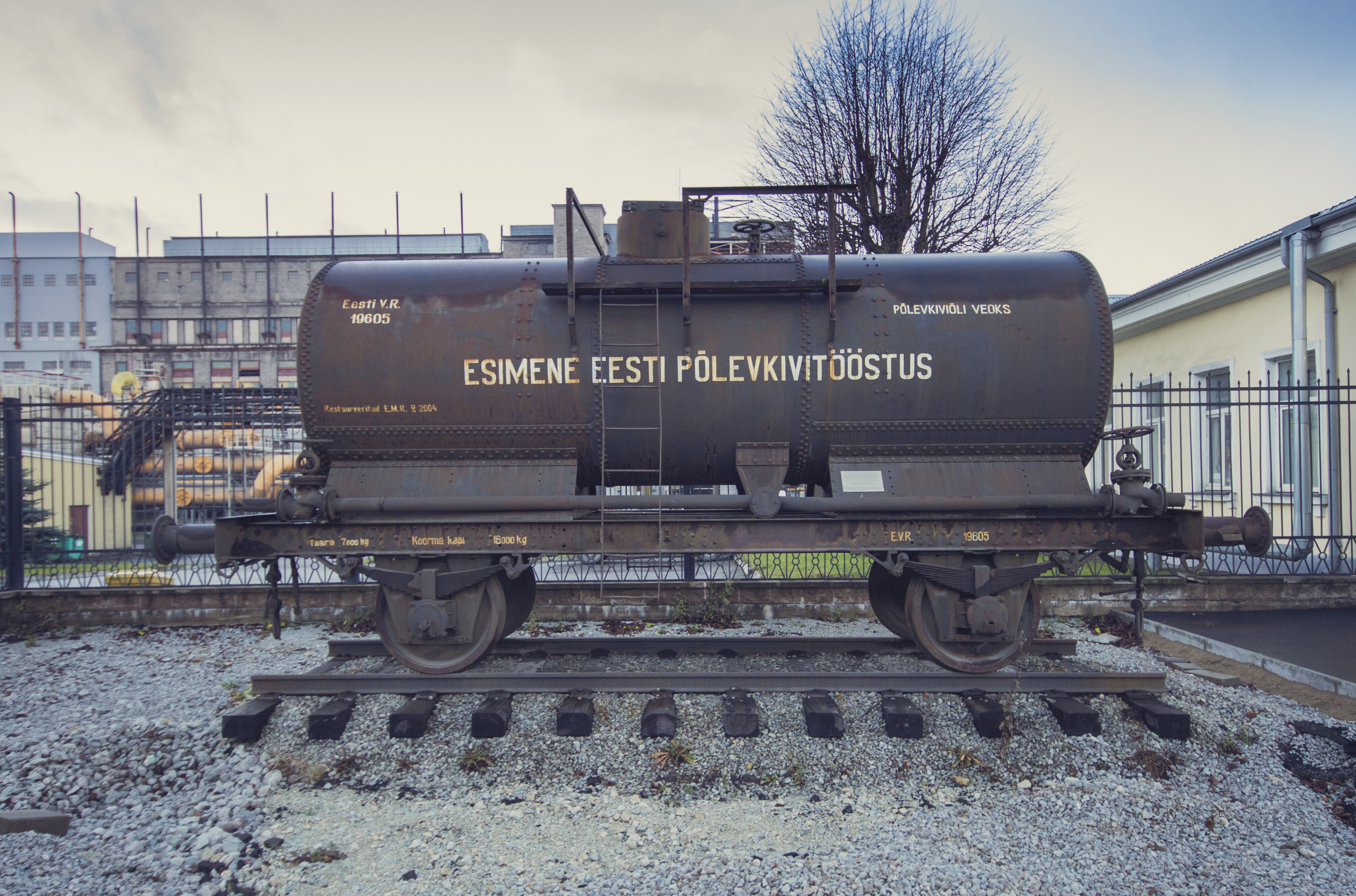
- Company type: Government-owned corporation
- Industry: Oil and gas
- Predecessor: Riigi Põlevkivitööstus
- Founded: 24 November 1918
- Founder: Ministry for Trade and Industry
- Defunct: 1940
- Fate: Taken over by the Soviet authorities
- Successor: Viru Keemia Grupp
- Headquarters: Kohtla-Järve, Estonia
- Key people: Märt Raud (Chairman); Karl Luts (Head of the oil shale laboratory); Jaan Kalviste (Chemist)
- Products: Shale oil
- Production output: 61,000 tonnes of shale oil (1939)
- Owner: Government of Estonia
- Number of employees: 2,680 (1938)

Esimene Eesti Põlevkivitööstus (literally: First Estonian Oil Shale Industry) was an oil shale company located in Kohtla-Järve, Estonia. It was a predecessor of Viru Keemia Grupp, a shale oil extraction company.

On 24 November 1918, the company was established as Riigi Põlevkivitööstus (English: State Oil Shale Industry), a department of the Ministry for Trade and Industry. It took over all existing open-pit mines. New underground mines were opened at Kukruse and Käva in 1920 and 1924 respectively. In 1921 it was the company to start shale oil production in Estonia. It built 14 experimental oil shale processing retorts in Kohtla-Järve. These vertical retorts used the method developed by Julius Pintsch AG that would later evolve into the current Kiviter processing technology. Each retort processed 40 tonnes of oil shale per day and produced an oil yield of 18%. Along with the shale oil extraction plant, an oil shale research laboratory was founded in 1921. Following the experimental retorts, the first commercial shale oil plant was put into operation on 24 December 1924.

In October 1936, Riigi Põlevkivitööstus was reorganized as the government-owned joint stock company and was renamed Esimene Eesti Põlevkivitööstus. In 1939, it was the second-largest shale oil producer after Eesti Kiviõli with 61,000 tonnes. It operated three shale oil extraction plants and was constructing the fourth plant. After occupation of Estonia by the Soviet Union, the company was subordinated to the Soviet authorities in December 1940.

== See also ==
- Eesti Küttejõud
- Eestimaa Õlikonsortsium
- New Consolidated Gold Fields
- Oil shale in Estonia

== Bibliography ==
- Holmberg, Rurik (2008). Survival of the Unfit. Path Dependence and the Estonian Oil Shale Industry (PDF). Linköping Studies in Arts and Science. Vol. 427. Linköping University.
- Ots, Arvo (2006) [2004]. Toni Tyson; Mary McQuillen (eds.). Oil Shale Fuel Combustion. Tallinn: Arv Ots; Eesti Energia. ISBN 978-9949-13-710-7.
