= Eesti Kiviõli =

Company based in Estonia

- Company type: Private limited company
- Industry: Oil and gas
- Founded: 1922
- Defunct: 1940
- Fate: Nationalized
- Successor: Kiviõli Keemiatööstus
- Headquarters: Kiviõli, Estonia
- Products: Shale oil
- Production output: 70,000 tonnes of shale oil (1939)
- Owner: G. Scheel & Co. Mendelssohn & Co.
- Subsidiaries: Trustivapaa Bensiini

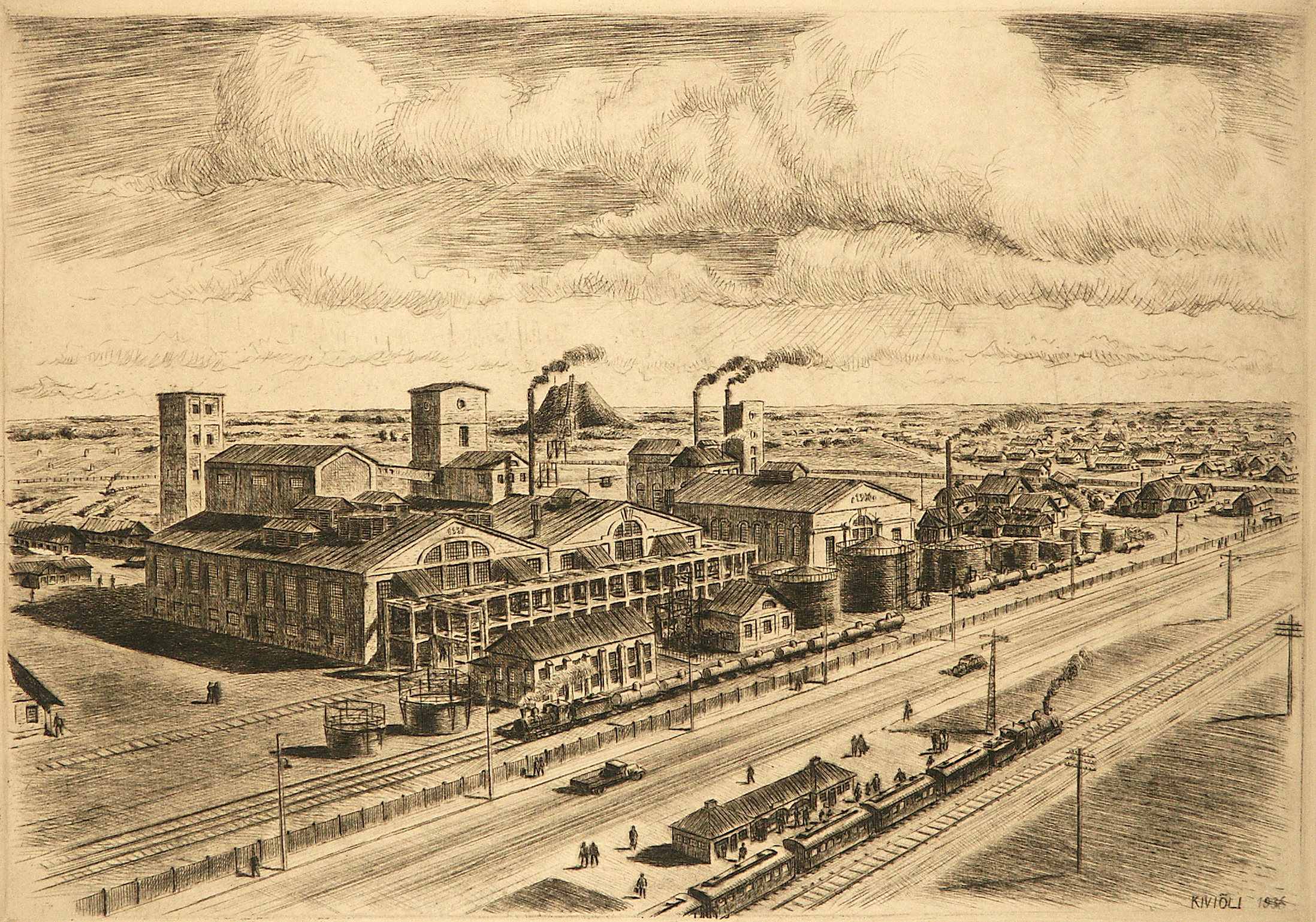
Kiviõli shale oil extraction plant. Drawing by Ernö Koch (1936).

AS Eesti Kiviõli (German: Estnische Steinöl AG, English: Estonian Oil Shale Co. Ltd.) was an oil shale company located in Kiviõli, Estonia. It was a predecessor of Kiviõli Keemiatööstus, a shale oil extraction company. The town of Kiviõli is named after Eesti Kiviõli.

Eesti Kiviõli was established in 1922. At the same year it opened an open-pit oil shale mine near Sonda, which since 1930 continued operations as underground mine. After unsuccessful tests with the moving grate kiln, the company built four tunnel kilns between 1927 and 1938, manufactured by AS Franz Krull. It built new shale oil extraction plants in 1932 and in 1938. In the 1930s it became the largest shale oil producer in Estonia. In 1939, it produced 70,000 tonnes of shale oil.

In 1934, Eesti Kiviõli and New Consolidated Gold Fields established the service station chain Trustivapaa Bensiini (now: Teboil) in Finland. During 1940 this chain sold more shale-oil-derived gasoline than the entire conventional gasoline market in Estonia did. In 1935, Eesti Kiviõli concluded a contract with the German Kriegsmarine to supply shale oil as a ship fuel.

The company was held by the Baltic-German bank G. Scheel & Co. and the German bank Mendelssohn & Co. In 1938, Bankhaus Mendelssohn & Co, which was the principal investor and shareholder in Eesti Kiviõli, was liquidated by Nazi Germany. Its stake in Eesti Kiviõli was transferred to G. Scheel & Co, which transferred it to Nederlandsche Handel-Maatschappij. After Germany occupied the Netherlands in May 1940, these share were taken over by the German Government. After occupation of Estonia by the Soviet Union, the company was nationalized in 1940.

== See also ==
- Eestimaa Õlikonsortsium
- Esimene Eesti Põlevkivitööstus
- Oil shale in Estonia

== Bibliography ==
- Holmberg, Rurik (2008). Survival of the Unfit. Path Dependence and the Estonian Oil Shale Industry (PDF). Linköping Studies in Arts and Science. Vol. 427. Linköping University.
- Ots, Arvo (2006) [2004]. Toni Tyson; Mary McQuillen (eds.). Oil Shale Fuel Combustion. Tallinn: Arv Ots; Eesti Energia. ISBN 978-9949-13-710-7.
