= Silmet =

Company based in Estonia

NPM Silmet OÜ
- Type: Subsidiary of Neo Performance Materials
- Industry: Non-ferrous metal
- Headquarters: Sillamäe, Estonia
- Key people: Steven Williams & Andrei Litvinjuk (managing director); O.D. (financial director)
- Products: Rare Metals; Rare-Earth Products & Mixed Oxides
- Number of employees: 330
- Parent: Neo Performance Materials
- Website: Official website

NPM Silmet AS is a rare-earth processor located in Sillamäe, Estonia. It is a subsidiary of Neo Performance Materials.

== History ==
=== Pre-war history and World War II ===
History of Silmet dates back to 1926 when Swedish-Norwegian Eestimaa Õlikonsortsium (Swedish: Estländska Oljeskifferkonsortiet; English: Estonian Oil Consortium), controlled by Marcus Wallenberg, was established to build a shale oil extraction plant in Sillamäe. For shale oil production, the consortium built a tunnel oven in 1928. However, due to the Great Depression, production halted in 1930 and was restarted only in 1936 by the reorganized consortium called Baltic Oil Company. The second tunnel oven was added in 1938. The main product was gasoline. After the Soviet occupation started in 1940, the plant was nationalized according to the 30 May 1941 Moscow Agreement between the Soviet Union and Sweden. Germany invaded the Soviet Union in 1941 and the industry's infrastructure was largely destroyed by retreating Soviet forces. During the subsequent German occupation, the plant was restored and subordinated to a company named Baltische Öl GmbH. However, most of its facilities were destroyed during the war.

=== Soviet era ===
Restoration of the plant restarted immediately after Soviet troops took control in Estonia in 1944. In 1945, the Glavgastopprom Oil Shale Processing Plant was established based on the existing plant. In 1946, the Council of Ministers of the Soviet Union approved the establishment of the diversified enterprise Kombinat No 7 on the basis of the Glavgastopprom Oil Shale Processing Plant for mining and processing Dictyonema argillite ore (a type of oil shale). The new plant was built mainly by using labour of war prisoners. In 1947 when the new factory was built, the code name Military Unit No 77960 was assigned to the Kombinat No 7. In 1955, a new code name Enterprise POB 22 was assigned. During the Soviet period, the enterprise was renamed several times and its names included Factory No 7, Enterprise P.O.B. P-6685, Sillamäe Metallurgical Plant, and Sillamäe Chemical Metallurgical Production Association.

During 1946–1952, Dictyonema argillite was mined and used for uranium oxide production. Later richer uranium ores were imported to the Sillamäe plant from various locations of Central Asia and the Eastern Bloc, mainly from mines in Czechoslovakia, East Germany, Hungary, Poland and Romania. In 1982, the plant began the production of reactor-grade enriched uranium (2–4.4% ^{235}U) in form of UO_{2}. Uranium production at Sillamäe continued to supply nuclear materials for the Soviet nuclear power plants and weapon facilities until 1989. In the years of 1950–1989, the plant produced about 98,681 tonnes of uranium (mostly as U_{3}O_{8}) and 1354.7 tonnes of enriched uranium.

In 1970, the plant started to process loparite ore from the Kola Peninsula producing tantalum and niobium. Later, it also started to extract rare-earth metal oxides.

=== 1990–recent time ===
In 1990, the enterprise stopped processing uranium. It was renamed Silmet and was reorganized as state-owned joint-stock company. In 1997, the company was privatized. Following the privatization, the company went under control of former prime minister Tiit Vähi. In 2002, Austrian Treibacher Industrie AG became a minority shareholder. In 2005, Vähi sold a controlling stake in Silmet to Russian related Swiss company Zimal SA, but bought it back in 2010.

In April 2011, Molycorp bought 90% stake in Silmet for US$89 million. The company was renamed Molycorp Silmet. Remaining 10% was acquired by Molycorp in October 2011.

In June 2015, Silmet's parent company Molycorp filed for bankruptcy. New owner of Silmet is Toronto-based Neo Performance Materials Corp. Correspondingly, Silmet was renamed NPM Silmet in September 2016.

In 2019, NPM Silmet OÜ received recognition as the best enterprise in Ida-Virumaa and the best enterprise of Estonian chemical industry.

== Operations ==
Silmet operates three factories: metallurgical factory, rare metals factory, and rare-earth metals factory. Its main products are niobium and tantalum.
