= List of waterfalls in Estonia =

This is a list of major waterfalls in Estonia.

Name	Elevation (m)	River	Location (county, municipality)	Further info	Image
Ahermu Falls	1.5		Ida-Viru County, Lüganuse Parish		
Aluoja Falls	5.8	Mägara Creek	Ida-Viru County, Toila Parish		
Aseri Falls	1.4		Ida-Viru County, Viru-Nigula Parish		
Hundikuristik	4		Harju County, Tallinn		
Jägala Falls	8	Jägala	Harju County, Jõelähtme Parish	Highest natural waterfall	
Karjaoru Falls	8	Ontika Main Ditch	Ida-Viru County, Toila Parish		
Keila Falls	6	Keila	Harju County, Lääne-Harju Parish		
Kersalu Falls	3.5		Harju County, Lääne-Harju Parish		
Kohina Falls			Lääne-Viru County, Viru-Nigula Parish		
Langevoja Falls			Ida-Viru County, Sillamäe		
Narva Falls	6.5	Narva	Ida-Viru County, Narva		
Nõmmeveski Falls			Harju County, Kuusalu Parish		
Saka (Kivisilla) Falls			Ida-Viru County, Toila Parish		
Treppoja Falls			Harju County, Lääne-Harju Parish		
Tõrvajõgi Falls	2.5	Tõrvajõgi	Ida-Viru County, Narva-Jõesuu		
Turjekelder Falls	4	Turje stream	Harju County, Kuusalu Parish		
Vahiküla Falls			Harju County, Harku Parish		
Valaste Falls	30.5	Valaste Creek	Ida-Viru County, Toila Parish		
Valli Falls			Harju County, Lääne-Harju Parish		
