= Kohtla (disambiguation) =

Kohtla is a village in Estonia.

Kohtla may also refer to:

- Kohtla Parish, municipality in Estonia
- Kohtla-Järve, city and municipality in Estonia
- Kohtla-Nõmme, borough in Estonia
