= Päite Landscape Conservation Area =

Protected area in Estonia

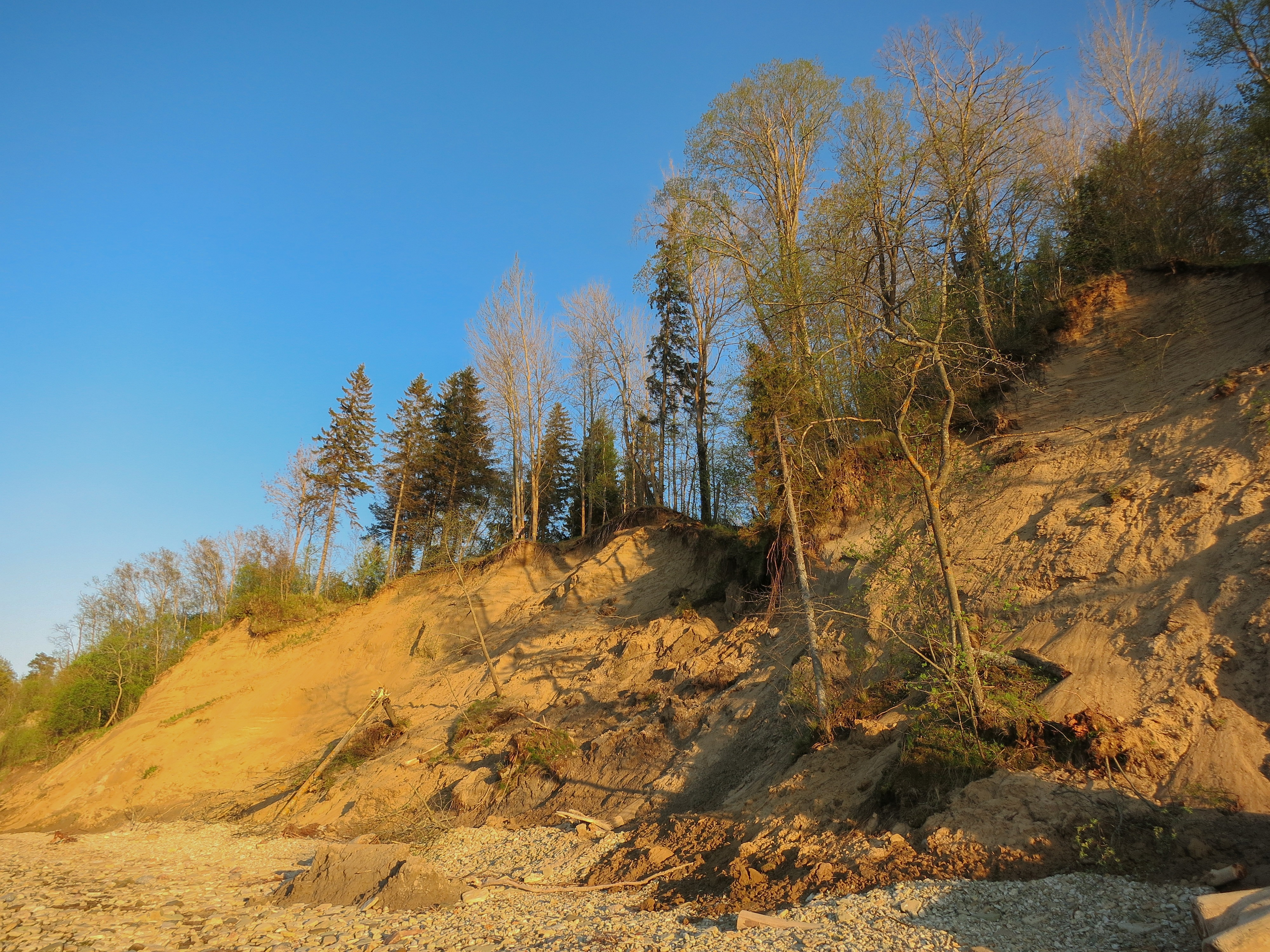

- Location within Estonia
- Location: Estonia
- Coordinates: 59°24′50″N 27°40′00″E
- Area: 129 ha (320 acres)
- Established: 2005

Päite Landscape Conservation Area is a nature park which is located in Ida-Viru County, Estonia.

The area of the nature park is 129 ha.

The protected area was founded in 2005 to protect the landscapes and biodiversity of Toila Parish (including Päite village).
