= Johannes Pääsuke =

Estonian photographer and filmmaker

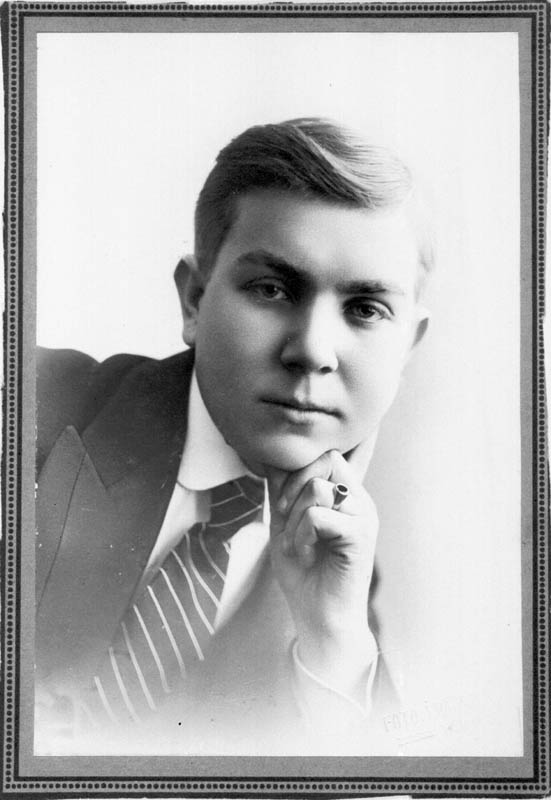
- Johannes Pääsuke
- Born: 30 March 1892; Tartu, Livonia, Russian Empire
- Died: 8 January 1918 (aged 25); Orsha, Mogilev Governorate
- Occupation(s): Photographer film director cinematographer

Johannes Pääsuke (30 March [O.S. 18 March] 1892 – 8 January 1918 [O.S. 27 December 1917]) was an Estonian photographer and filmmaker. He worked as a photographer for the Estonian National Museum and was dedicated to recording the everyday life of Estonians in the early 20th century. In 1914, he directed one of the first Estonian feature films, Bear Hunt in Pärnu County (Estonian: Karujaht Pärnumaal).

== Life ==
Very little is known of the youth of Johannes Pääsuke. He was born in Tartu, the fourth of the six children of a comfortably-off couple. Johannes's siblings were well educated, but all that is known about Johannes's own education is that he studied photography. By his own account, he started photography at fifteen in 1907 and it is likely that he contacted the Estonian National Museum (ERM) in 1912, having already taken photographs in various places in Estonia.

In 1913, Pääsuke began a project for the ERM to document Estonia's lands, trades and architecture through photography and the collection of artifacts.

Pääsuke with companion Harri Volter at the beginning of the trip in Vaivara (1913)

A major part of this project was a tour Pääsuke made with an assistant, Harri Volter, to the Estonian coast, from 10 June to 29 July 1913. The two traveled most of the way by foot, carrying the normal luggage and also cameras, a tripod, plates and so forth. Three hundred and seventeen photographs remain from this trip, many of Saaremaa and Muhu. Pääsuke's work was highly appreciated by ERM, which opened an exhibition of the photographs on 2 August 1913.

Pääsuke is known to have taken more than 1,300 photographs on glass plates in this national ethnographic project, which also included two larger series, one made in 1908–13 across much of the south of the nation, and the other made in 1914 in Tartu.

Pääsuke was also the first Estonian to make a film. He made about 40 films in his career with 10 films still in existence − five newsreels, four documentaries, and one work of fiction, the political satire Karujaht Pärnumaal (Bear Hunt in Pärnu County).

In 1915, Pääsuke was conscripted to serve as a second-rank infantryman in the reserve battalion of the Lithuanian Regiment of the Foot Guards; he was mobilized on 8 September and was in St Petersburg on 14 November. He managed to be recognized as a photographer, receiving a camera by the end of the month, and continued his photographic activities both in Russia proper and in Estonia.

Pääsuke died in a train accident in 1918 in Orsha, Belarus.

== Photography ==
Pääsuke is notable as an ethnophotographer, a supplier of photographic documentation to the Estonian National Museum (ENM) in Tartu. By 2003, the ENM had identified 1305 photographs and 723 glass negatives as his work, and suspected that more among the unidentified were also by him. The photographs are of buildings, people, and activities, taken on a 13×18 cm or other plate camera.

== In popular culture ==
In 2019, the Estonian feature film comedy Johannes Pääsukese tõeline elu (English release title: Self Made Cameraman), directed by Hardi Volmer, was released. It depicts Pääsuke, portrayed by Ott Sepp, and his assistant Harri Volter, portrayed by Märt Avandi, on their travels in 1913.

== Gallery ==
Seto man in the village of Võmmorski (1913)

Seto woman in traditional costume in the village of Võmmorski (1913)

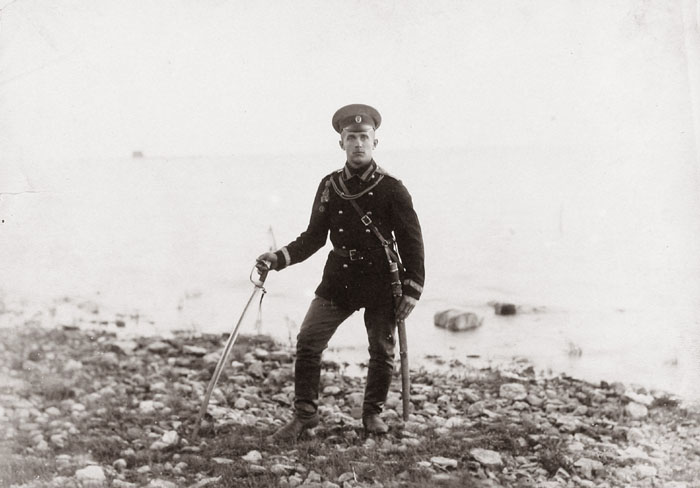
Estonian coast guard, beach knight (cavalry border guard) (1913)

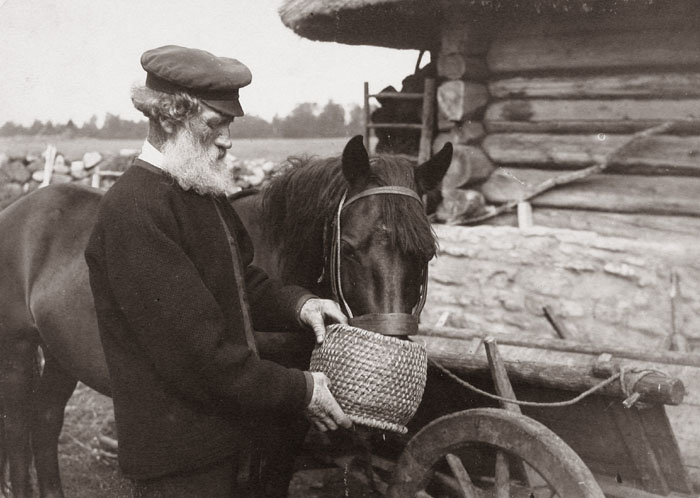
Muhu Islander feeding a horse (1913)

Manure haulers Gustav (aged 65) and Anton (aged 68) smoking pipes. Mõnnelohu farm, Pühajõe village (1913)

Fisherman Pärtel Ribin on Mummassaare beach (1913)

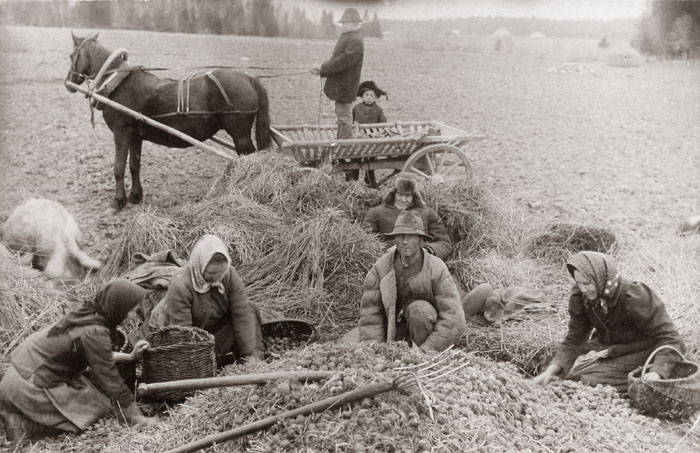
Sorting seed potatoes in Tartu County (1913)

Fishermen return from the sea (1913)

Kõrgeranna, Valaste village, clearing the net (1913)

Valaste village boys playing cards (1913)

== Filmography ==
Karujaht Pärnumaal (Bear Hunt in Pärnu County, 1914)

- Utotškini lendamised Tartu kohal (Utochkin's flights above Tartu, 1912)
- Utotškini lend (Utochkin's flight, 1912)
- Tartu linn ja ümbrus (The Town of Tartu and Environs, 1912)
- Ajaloolised mälestusmärgid Eestimaa minevikust (Historical memories of the Estonian past, 1913)
- Retk läbi Setumaa (A Trip through Setomaa, 1913)
- Karujaht Pärnumaal (Bear Hunt in Pärnu County, 1914) (Available as 12MB mpeg file.)

== Citations and references ==
=== Cited sources and other sources ===
- Johannes Pääsuke. Man with two Cameras About the 2005–6 exhibition at the Hungarian Museum of Ethnography.
- Johannes Pääsuke. Man with Two Cameras About the 2003 exhibition at the Estonian National Museum, Tartu.
- Johannes Pääsuke: Mees kahe kaameraga / Man with two cameras. Tartu: Estonian National Museum, 2003. ISBN 9985-9414-9-7 This book offers photographs and parallel texts in Estonian and English; the two cameras of the title are the still and cinecamera.
- Kaelep, Kairi. "Johannes Pääsuke: The story of his life and cooperation with the Estonian National Museum." In Johannes Pääsuke: Mees kahe kaameraga. Pp. 81–93.
- Linnap, Peeter. "Life director Pääsuke and positivist ethnography." In Johannes Pääsuke: Mees kahe kaameraga. Pp. 95–104.
- Lõhmus, Jaak. "The once again discovered film-maker Pääsuke." In Johannes Pääsuke: Mees kahe kaameraga. Pp. 106–14.
- (in Estonian) Ruus, Jaan. Foto Johannes Pääsukesest.
