= Martsa =

Village in Estonia

- Village
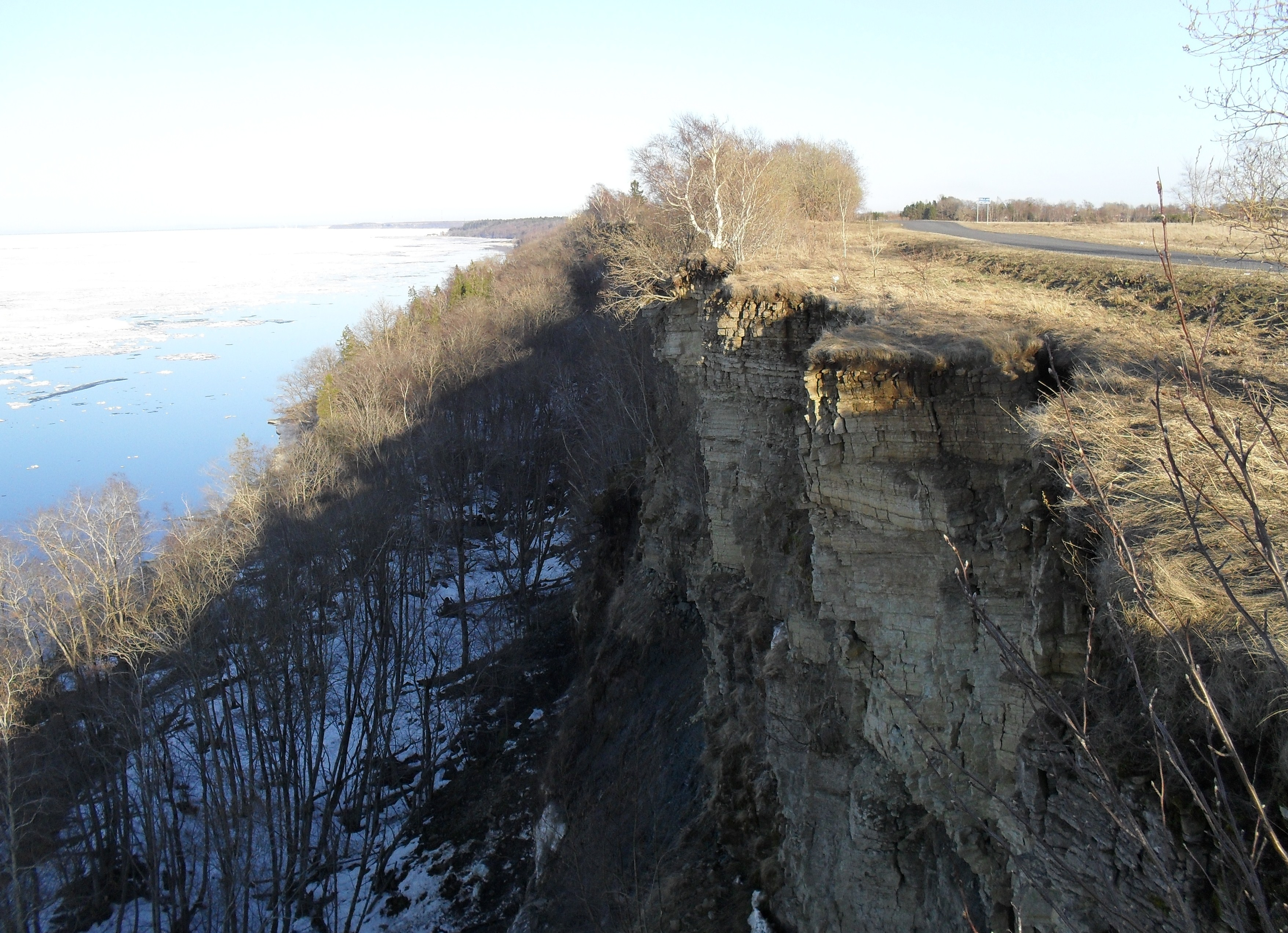
- The Baltic Klint in Martsa.

- Location in Estonia
- Coordinates: 59°25′52″N 27°27′27″E
- Country: Estonia
- County: Ida-Viru County
- Municipality: Toila Parish

Population (2011 Census)
  - Total: 27

Martsa is a village in Toila Parish, Ida-Viru County in northeastern Estonia. As of the 2011 census, the settlement's population was 27.

== Name ==
Martsa was attested in historical sources as Martzby in 1583, Mätz by in 1620, Martza in 1726, and Marzo in 1796. The origin and meaning of the name are unknown.
