= Arno Rossman =

Estonian politician (born 1954)

Arno Rossman (born 1954) is an Estonian politician. He was a member of X Riigikogu.

Prior to becoming an alternate member of the Riigikogu, Rossman was the Mayor of Kohtla Parish.
