= Paite =

Paite or Päite may refer to:

- Paite people, in northeastern India
  - Paite language, their Sino-Tibetan language
- Päite, a village in Ida-Viru County in northeastern Estonia
