= Mägara Creek =

River in Estonia

Location
- Country: Estonia

Physical characteristics
- Mouth: Pühajõgi
  - coordinates: 59°24′14″N 27°32′09″E
- Length: 15.8 km
- Basin size: 36 km²

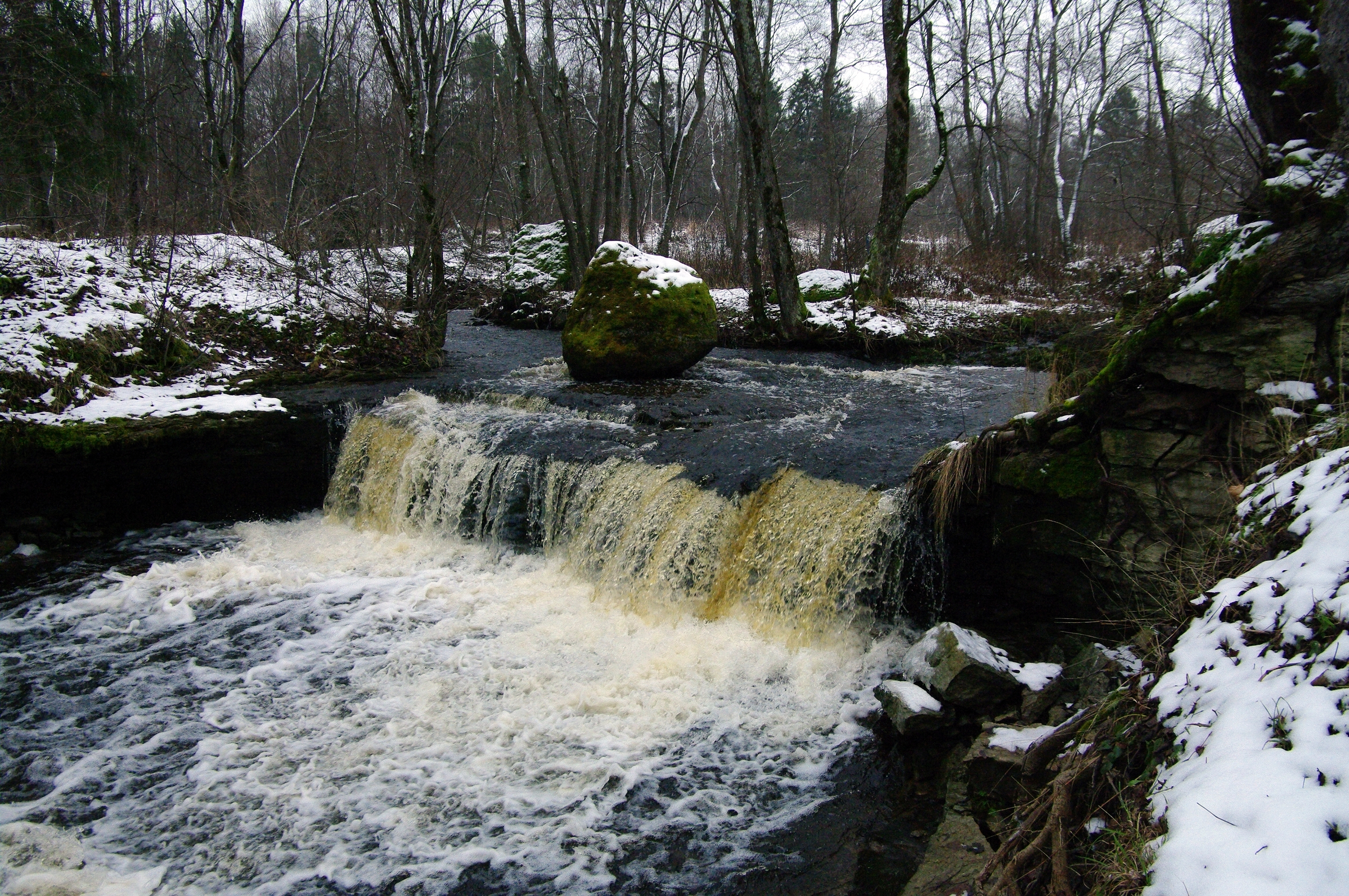
Aluoja Falls

Mägara Creek is a stream in Toila Parish, Ida-Viru County. The stream is 15.8 meters (52 ft) long and its basin size is 36 square kilometers (14 sq mi). It is a tributary of the Pühajõgi River.

The stream is known mainly because of Aluoja Falls. The cascades are located in the village of Pühajõe. The heights of the cascades (moving downstream) are 1.4 meters (4 ft 7 in), 0.7 meters (2 ft 4 in), 1.9 meters (6 ft 3 in), 1.3 meters (4 ft 3 in), and 0.5 meters (1 ft 8 in).
