= Naage Landscape Conservation Area =

Protected area in Estonia

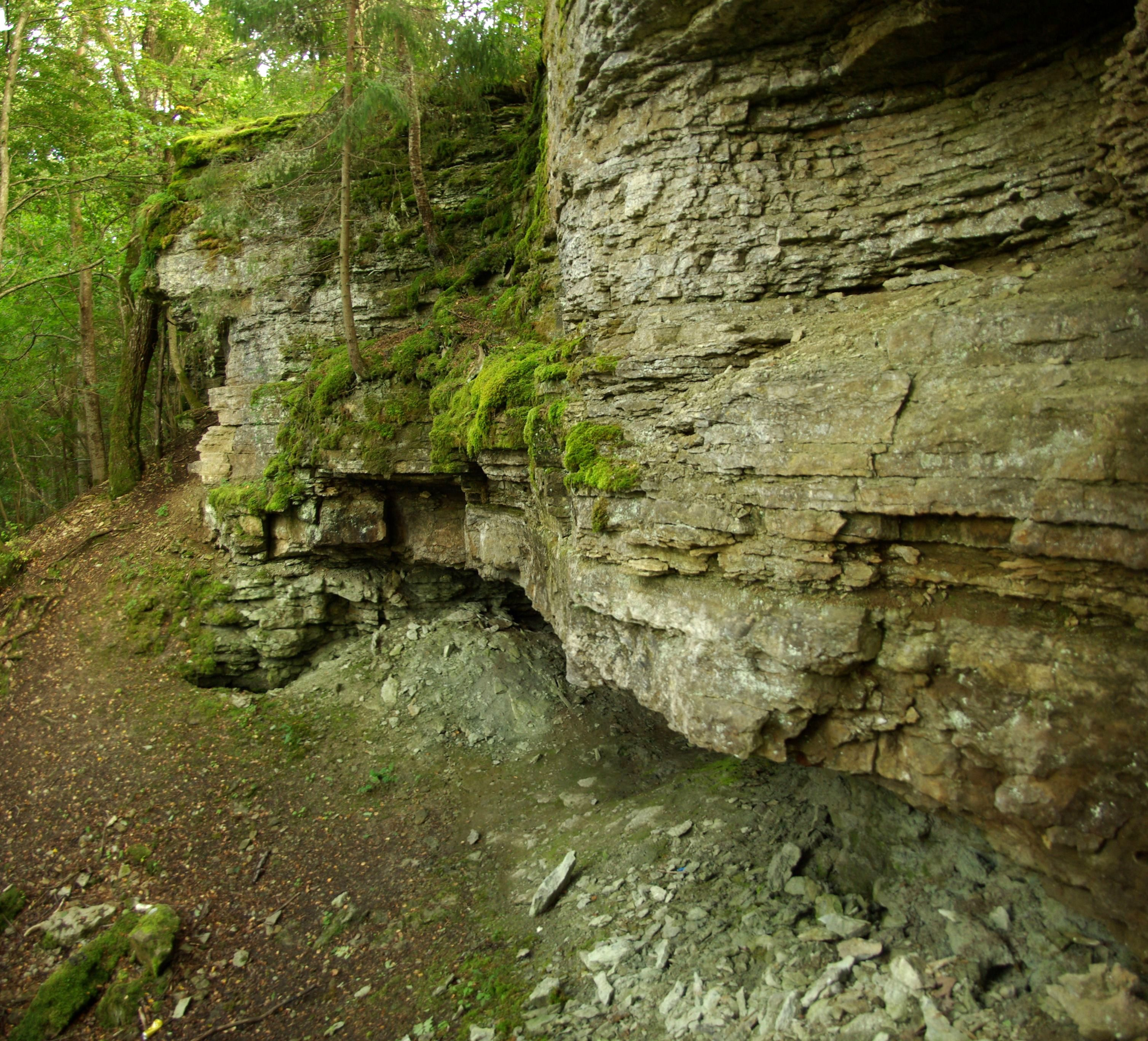

- Location within Estonia
- Location: Estonia
- Coordinates: 59°24′24″N 24°21′40″E
- Area: 5 ha (12 acres)
- Established: 2005

Naage Landscape Conservation Area is a nature park is located in Harju County, Estonia.

The area of the nature park is 5 ha.

The protected area was founded in 2005 to protect Baltic Klint, its klint forests (Estonian: pangamets) and theirs biodiversity.
