= Saka, Estonia =

Village in Estonia

Coordinates: 59°26′N 27°13′E

Saka
- Village
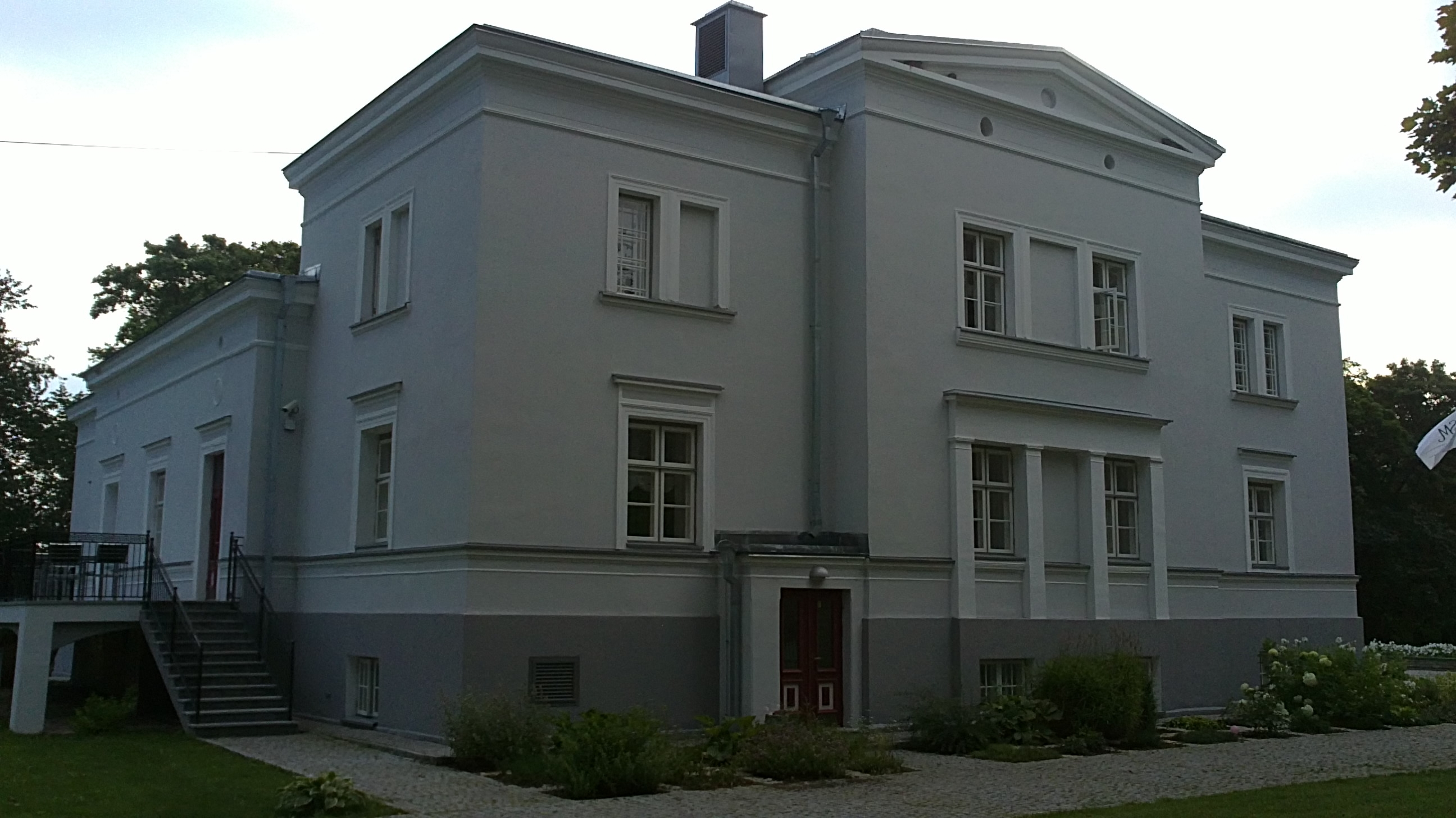
- Saka Manor
- Interactive map of Saka
- Country: Estonia
- County: Ida-Viru County
- Parish: Toila Parish
- Time zone: UTC+2 (EET)
  - Summer (DST): UTC+3 (EEST)

Saka is a village in Toila Parish, Ida-Viru County in northeastern Estonia. Before the 2017 Administrative Reform, the village belonged to Kohtla Parish. Karjaoru Falls is located in Saka.

== Saka Manor ==
In 1626, Saka (German: Sackhof) was given as an estate by Swedish King Gustavus Adolphus to the alderman of Narva Jürgen Leslie of Aberdeen, whose origins were Scottish but who had probably entered Swedish service during the time of the Thirty Years' War. The estate later passed into the Baltic German von Löwis of Menar family, and the current building was erected during the ownership of Oscar von Löwis of Menar, from 1862 to 1864. It was built in an accomplished Italian renaissance style, unusual for Estonian manor houses.

During the Soviet occupation of Estonia, the manor was used by Soviet military forces. During this time, the manor and the park fell into disrepair. It was abandoned, looted, and left in ruins after their departure, but was later restored.

A monument commemorating the 1987 flight of Mathias Rust, who entered Soviet airspace in the Saka area, was unveiled at Saka Manor in 2022.

== Saka Hoard ==
In 2015, the Saka Hoard was discovered in Saka. It is a silver hoard dating from the 11th or early 12th century.
