= Metsamägara =

Village in Estonia

Coordinates: 59°23′44″N 27°29′25″E

- Village
- Interactive map of Metsamägara
- Country: Estonia
- County: Ida-Viru County
- Parish: Toila Parish
- Time zone: UTC+2 (EET)
  - Summer (DST): UTC+3 (EEST)

Metsamägara is a village in Toila Parish, Ida-Viru County in northeastern Estonia.
