= Peeri =

Village in Estonia

Coordinates: 59°23′N 27°18′E

- Village
- Interactive map of Peeri
- Country: Estonia
- County: Ida-Viru County
- Parish: Toila Parish
- Time zone: UTC+2 (EET)
  - Summer (DST): UTC+3 (EEST)

Peeri (German: Perifer) is a village in Toila Parish, Ida-Viru County in northeastern Estonia.

Before the 2017 Administrative Reform, the village belonged to Kohtla Parish.
