= Järve, Toila Parish =

Village in Estonia

Coordinates: 59°24′34″N 27°18′25″E

Järve
- Village
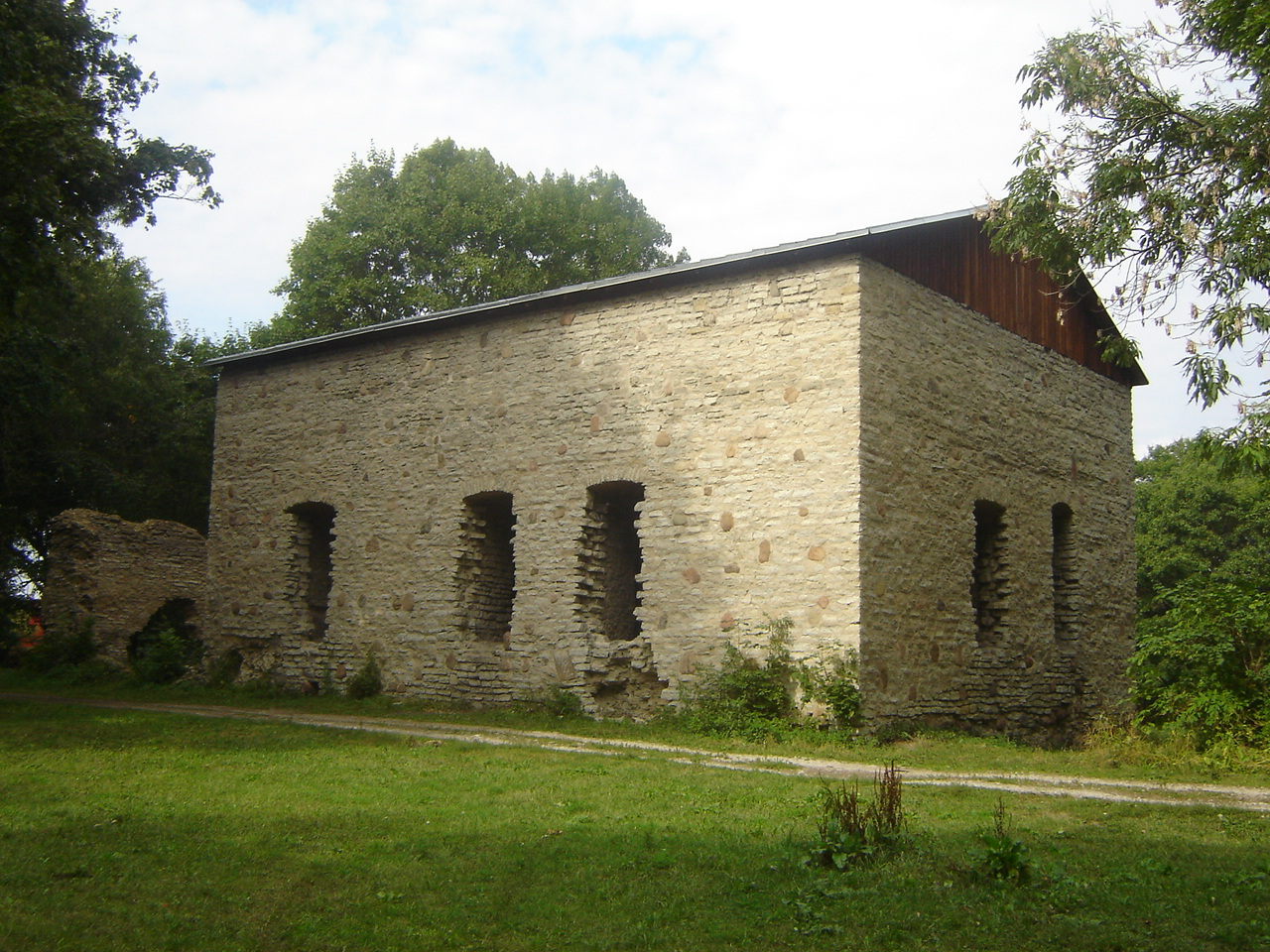
- Järve vassal fortress
- Interactive map of Järve
- Country: Estonia
- County: Ida-Viru County
- Parish: Toila Parish
- Time zone: UTC+2 (EET)
  - Summer (DST): UTC+3 (EEST)

Järve is a village in Toila Parish, Ida-Viru County in northeastern Estonia.

Before the 2017 Administrative Reform, the Järve was the administrative centre of Kohtla Parish.
