= Altküla, Ida-Viru County =

Village in Estonia

Coordinates: 59°25′00″N 27°29′46″E

Altküla
- Village
- Interactive map of Altküla
- Country: Estonia
- County: Ida-Viru County
- Parish: Toila Parish
- First mentioned: 1426
- Time zone: UTC+2 (EET)
  - Summer (DST): UTC+3 (EEST)

Altküla is a village in Toila Parish, Ida-Viru County in northeastern Estonia.

== Name ==
Altküla was first mentioned in historical sources in 1426 as Kerileppe (i.e., the equivalent of Kärilõpe or Karilõpe), and then as Kirrilep in 1726, Kerrilep in 1796, and Kärrilep in 1871.
