= Karl Orviku =

Estonian geologist (1903–1981)

Karl Orviku (17 August 1903, Kohtla – 7 March 1981, Tallinn) was an Estonian geologist. He specialized in quaternary geology. In 1930 he graduated from University of Tartu with a master's degree in geology. Since 1926 he worked as the chair of geology at Tartu University. And From 1954 to 1968 he was the director.

Since 1954 he was a member of the ESSR Academy of Sciences.

From 1961 to 1965 he was a member of the executive committee of the International Union for Quaternary Research.

Karl Orviku's son Kaarel Orviku (1935–2021) was a marine geologist and nature photographer.
