= Kaarel Orviku =

Estonian geologist and photographer (1935–2021)

Kaarel Orviku (15 July 1935 in Tartu – 24 July 2021) was an Estonian geologist (marine geologist) and nature photographer. His scientific activity is mainly related to the coasts of Estonia. His father was geologist Karl Orviku.

In 1959 he graduated from Tartu State University. And Since 1959 he was teaching at Tallinn University, but prior he taught at Tallinn University of Technology.

From 1993–2009 he worked at AS Merin which dealt with questions with coastal areas and environmental assessment.

== Awards ==
- 2001: Order of the White Star, V class.
