= Konju =

Village in Estonia

Coordinates: 59°24′N 27°38′E

- Village
- Interactive map of Konju
- Country: Estonia
- County: Ida-Viru County
- Parish: Toila Parish
- Time zone: UTC+2 (EET)
  - Summer (DST): UTC+3 (EEST)

Konju is a village in Toila Parish, Ida-Viru County in northeastern Estonia.
