= Karujaht Pärnumaal =

1914 film directed by Johannes Pääsuke

- Directed by: Johannes Pääsuke
- Written by: Karl August Hindrey
- Produced by: Aleksander Tippo, Estonia Film
- Release date: February 13, 1914
- Running time: 11 minutes
- Countries: Estonia; Russian Empire

Karujaht Pärnumaal (English: Bear Hunt in Pärnu County) is the first Estonian narrative film 1914, directed by Johannes Pääsuke.
