= Karjaoru Falls =

Waterfall in Ida-Viru County, Estonia

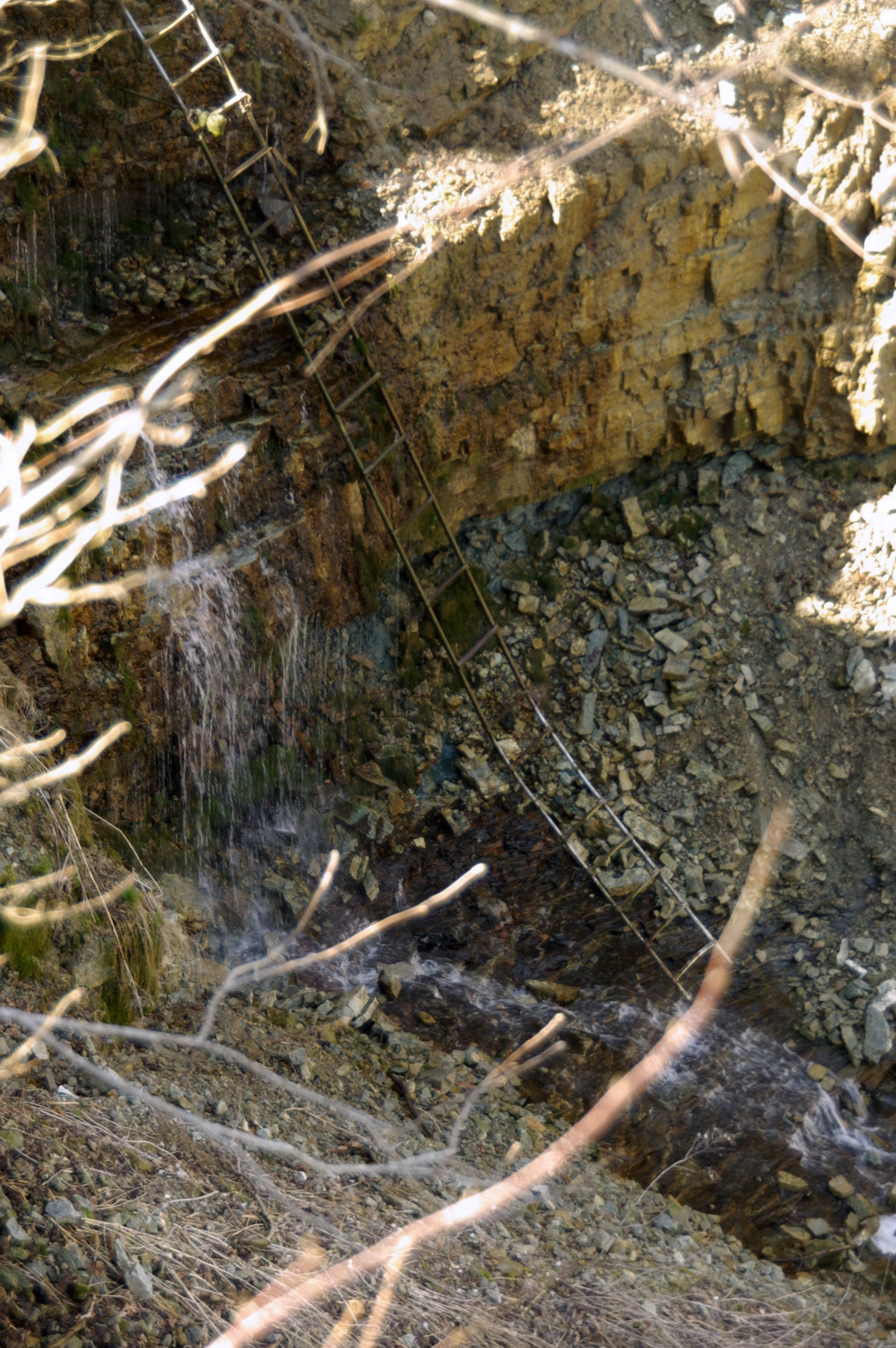
- Interactive map of Karjaoru Falls
- Location: Saka, Toila Parish, Ida-Viru County, Estonia
- Coordinates: 59.442508°N 27.269618°E
- Total height: 18 m (59 ft)
- Number of drops: 2

Karjaoru Falls (Estonian: Karjaoru joastik or Karjaoru juga) is a waterfall in northern Estonia. It is located in the village of Saka in Toila Parish, Ida-Viru County.

The water of the falls comes from the main channel of Ontika Creek, a drainage ditch. There are two escarpments on the stream; the height of the first one in the direction of the flow is 3.5 meters (11 ft) and the second one is 5.5 meters (18 ft). In total, the total height of the cascades is 12 meters. After the escarpments, the water continues to flow down, creating a waterfall with a total height of 18 meters (59 ft). The water in the channel is low only in very dry summers.

The outcrop at the falls is a stratotype of the Saka Member of the Toila Formation. The upper 6 meters (20 ft) are made of limestone (Loobu Formation and Aseri Formation). Below it is a 15-centimeter (5.9 in) layer of clayey ooid-containing limestone of the Silaoru Formation. Below it is a 130-centimeter (51 in) layer of glauconite-containing limestone of the Kalvi and Künnapõhja Members, and the lower part of the outcrop consists of thick-layered yellow dolomitized limestone of the Saka Member.
