= Mõisamaa, Ida-Viru County =

Village in Estonia

Coordinates: 59°23′01″N 27°16′06″E

Mõisamaa
- Village
- Interactive map of Mõisamaa
- Country: Estonia
- County: Ida-Viru County
- Parish: Toila Parish
- Time zone: UTC+2 (EET)
  - Summer (DST): UTC+3 (EEST)

Mõisamaa is a village in Toila Parish, Ida-Viru County in northeastern Estonia.

Before the 2017 Administrative Reform, the village belonged to Kohtla Parish.

== Geography ==
Mõisamaa covers an area of 44,827 square meters and operates on Eastern European Standard Time.
