= Paate =

Village in Estonia

Coordinates: 59°24′28″N 27°19′43″E

- Village
- Interactive map of Paate
- Country: Estonia
- County: Ida-Viru County
- Parish: Toila Parish
- Time zone: UTC+2 (EET)
  - Summer (DST): UTC+3 (EEST)

Paate (German: Paatz) is a village in Toila Parish, Ida-Viru County in northeastern Estonia.

Before the 2017 Administrative Reform, the village belonged to Kohtla Parish.
