= Saka Hoard =

2015 discovered hoard in Estonia

The Saka Hoard is a silver hoard discovered in 2015 in Saka, Estonia. It consists of two neck rings and two spiral rings made of silver.

The hoard was discovered by an amateur archaeologist using a metal detector on 31 August 2015. He immediately informed Estonian authorities and helped them uncover the hoard. The archaeologists discovered no traces of any settlement close to the deposit, and as it contained no coins the deposit has been dated on stylistic grounds. It has been estimated that the hoard was deposited in the early 12th century or during the 11th century. It consists of two neck rings, weighing 193 grams (6.8 oz) and 150 grams (5.3 oz) and two spiral rings weighing 104 grams (3.7 oz) and 102 grams (3.6 oz). The finding indicates that the hoard was deliberately buried.
