= Kaasikvälja =

Village in Estonia

- Village
- Location within Estonia
- Coordinates: 59°25′18″N 27°18′24″E
- Country: Estonia
- County: Ida-Viru County
- Parish: Toila Parish

Population (2000)
  - Total: 32
- Time zone: UTC+2 (EET)
  - Summer (DST): UTC+3 (EEST)

Kaasikvälja is a village in Toila Parish, Ida-Viru County in northeastern Estonia.

Before the 2017 Administrative Reform, the village belonged to Kohtla Parish.
