= Valaste =

Village in Estonia

Coordinates: 59°26′N 27°22′E

- Village
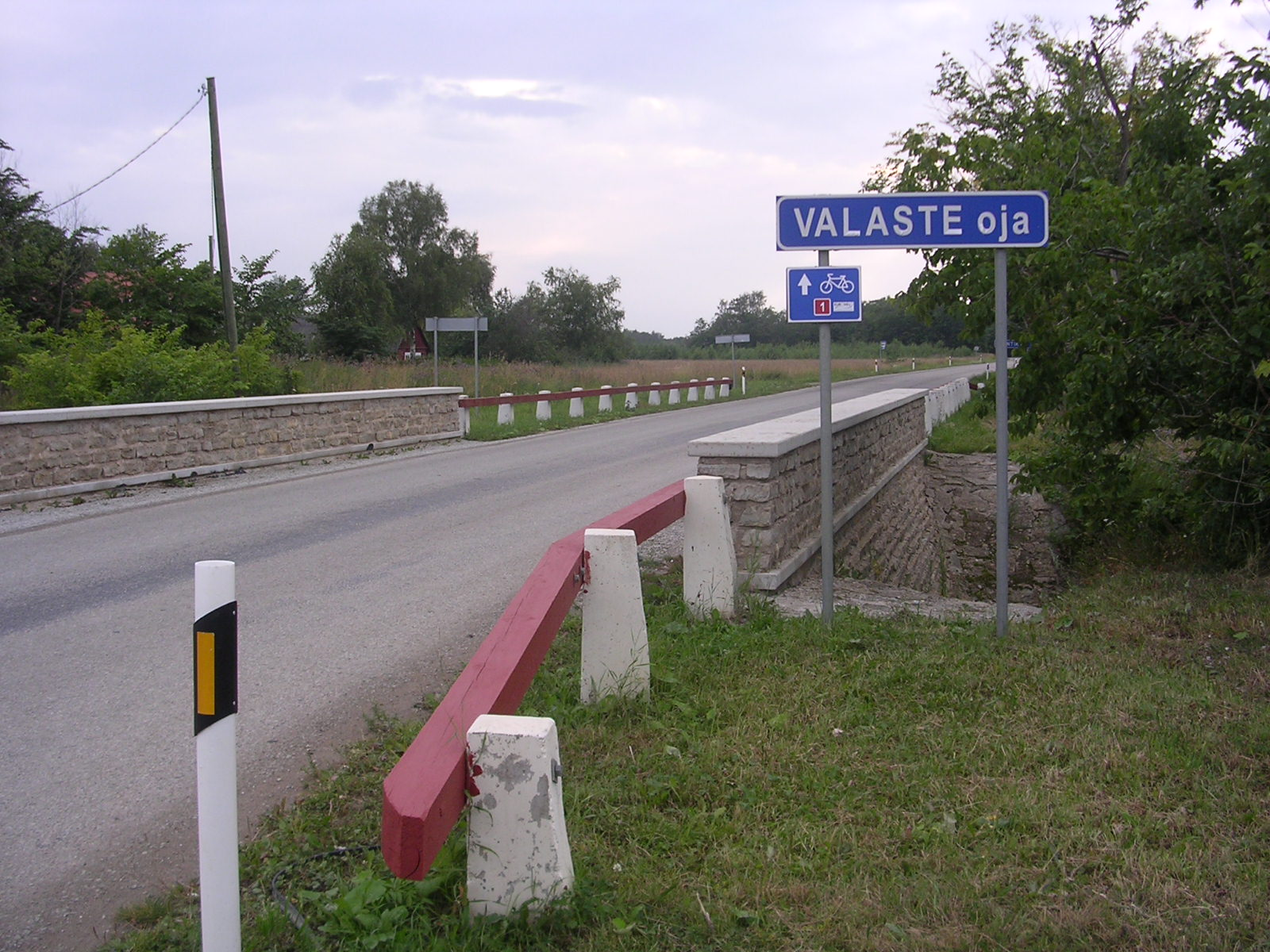
- Valaste stream in Valaste
- Interactive map of Valaste
- Country: Estonia
- County: Ida-Viru County
- Parish: Toila Parish
- Time zone: UTC+2 (EET)
  - Summer (DST): UTC+3 (EEST)

Valaste is a village in Toila Parish, Ida-Viru County in northeastern Estonia. Its German name was Wallast. The village is home to Estonia's highest waterfall, Valaste Falls.

Before the 2017 Administrative Reform, the village belonged to Kohtla Parish.
