= Aluoja Falls =

Waterfall on Mägara Creek in Ida-Viru County, Estonia

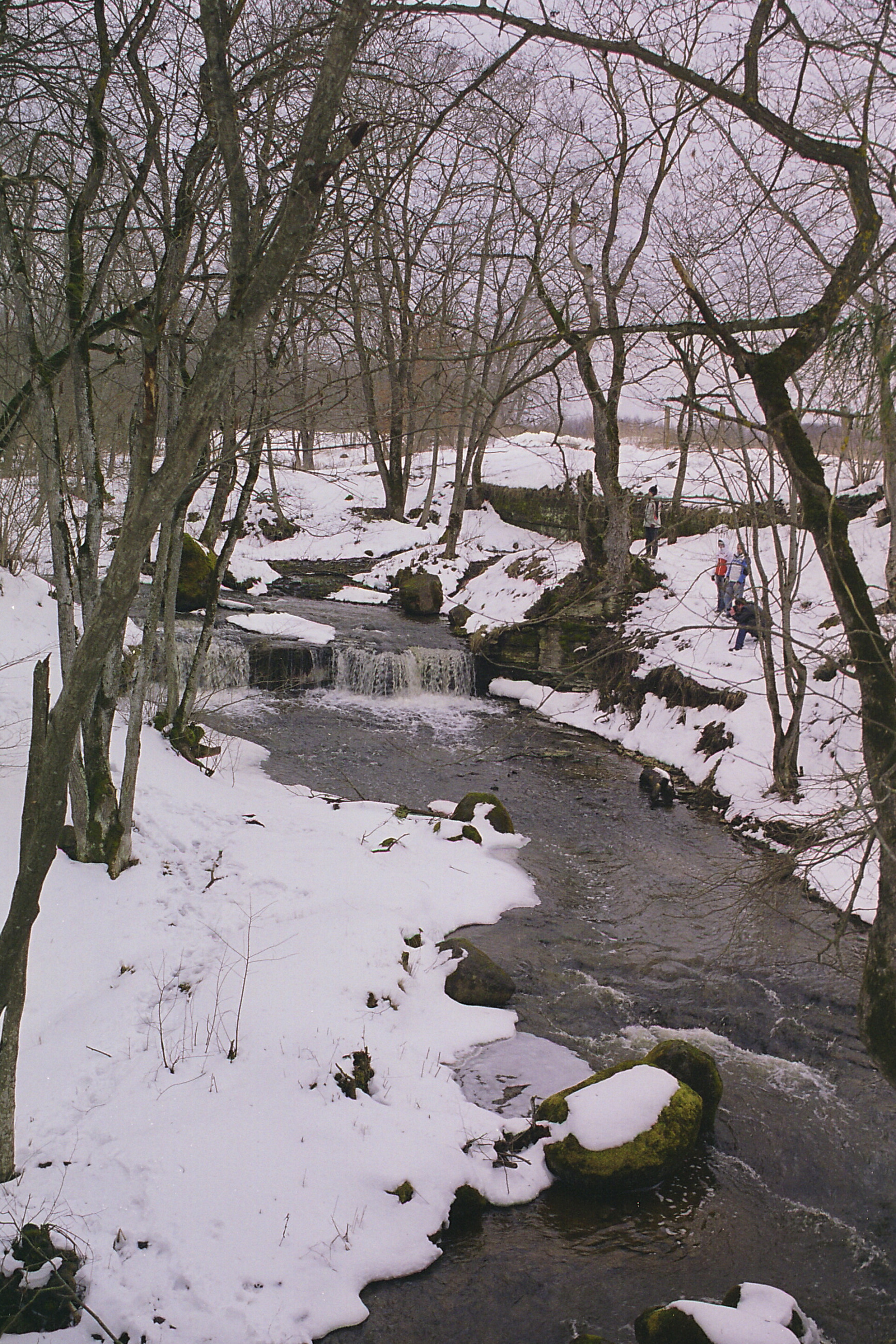
- Interactive map of Aluoja Falls
- Location: Pühajõe, Toila Parish, Ida-Viru County, Estonia
- Coordinates: 59.402967°N 27.534078°E
- Total height: 5.8 m (19 ft)
- Number of drops: 5
- Total width: 5–10 m (16–33 ft)

Aluoja Falls (Estonian: Aluoja joastik or Aluoja juga) is a waterfall in northern Estonia. It is located in the village of Pühajõe in Toila Parish, Ida-Viru County.

Aluoja Falls is located on Mägara Creek. Before descending into the Pühajõgi Valley, Mägara Creek forms Aluoja Canyon, which is about 700 meters (2,300 ft) long and about 10 meters (33 ft) deep. The waterfall consists of five large steps, the heights of which are 1.4 meters (4 ft 7 in), 0.7 meters (2 ft 4 in), 1.9 meters (6 ft 3 in), 1.3 meters (4 ft 3 in), and 0.5 meters (1 ft 8 in) from top to bottom. At the falls, the width of the water is 5 to 10 meters (16 to 33 ft). The ledge of Aluoja Falls is protected as a natural monument.

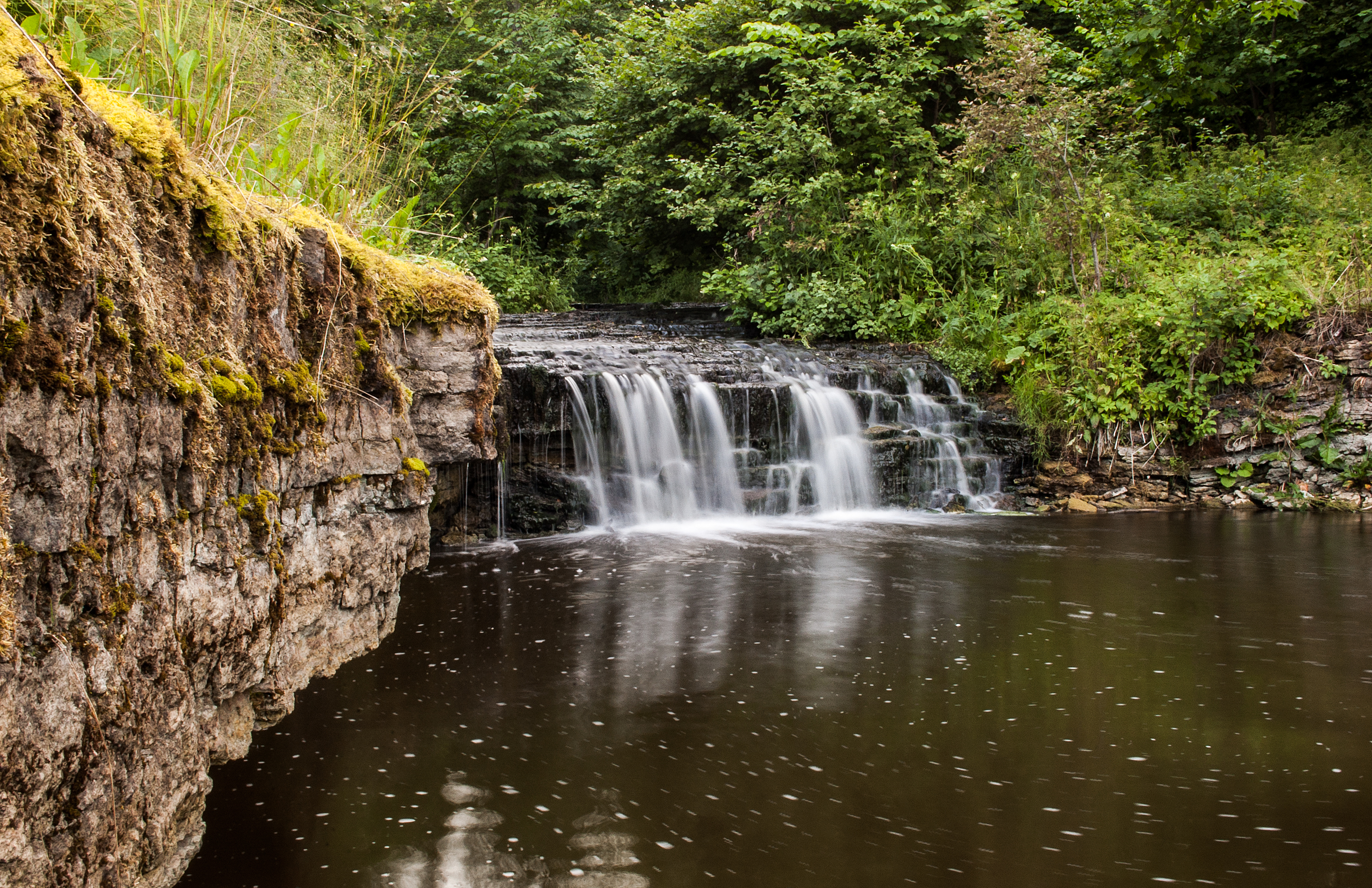
Aluoja Falls in 2013

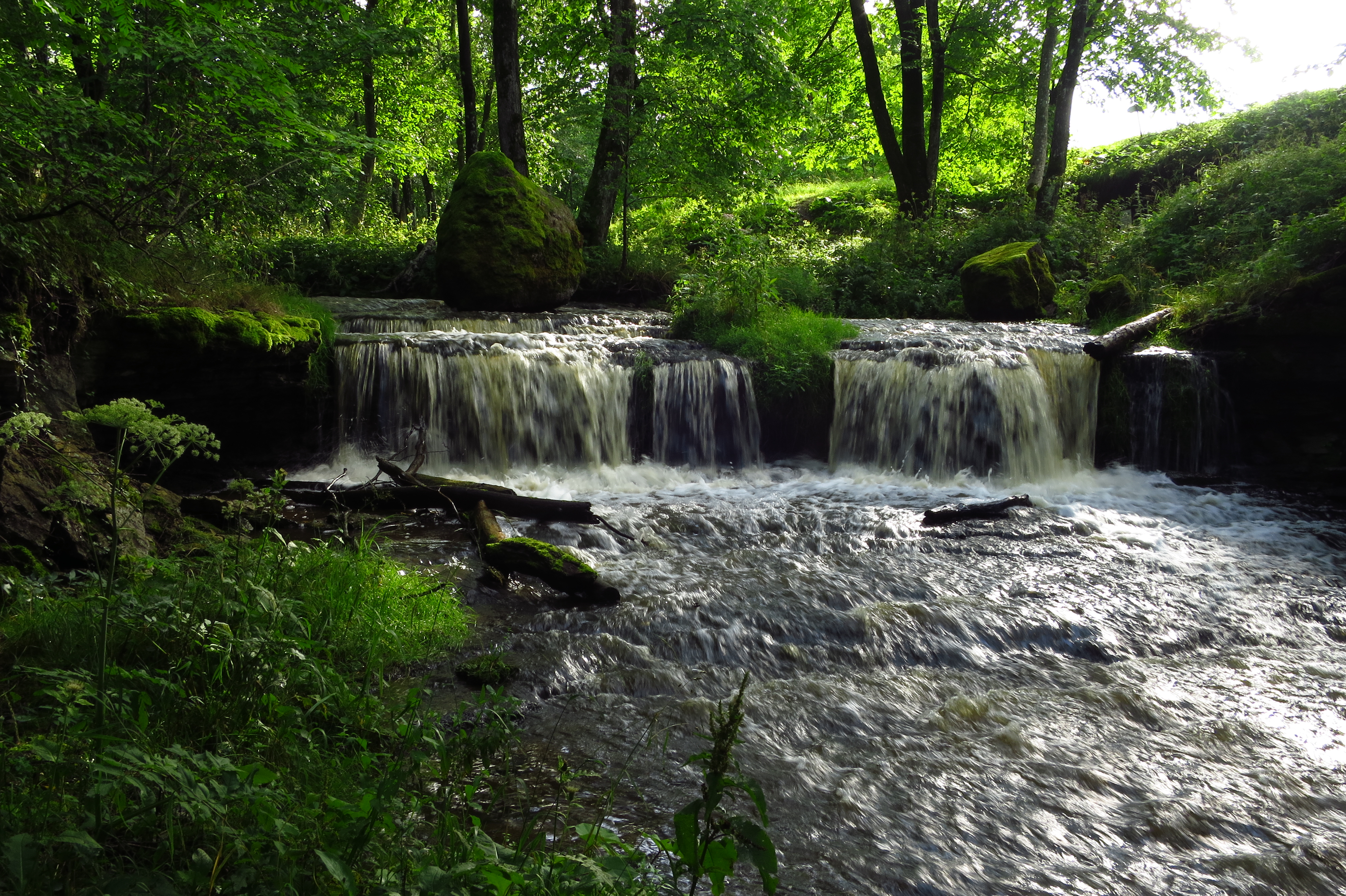
Aluoja Falls in 2016
