= Päite =

Village in Estonia

- Village
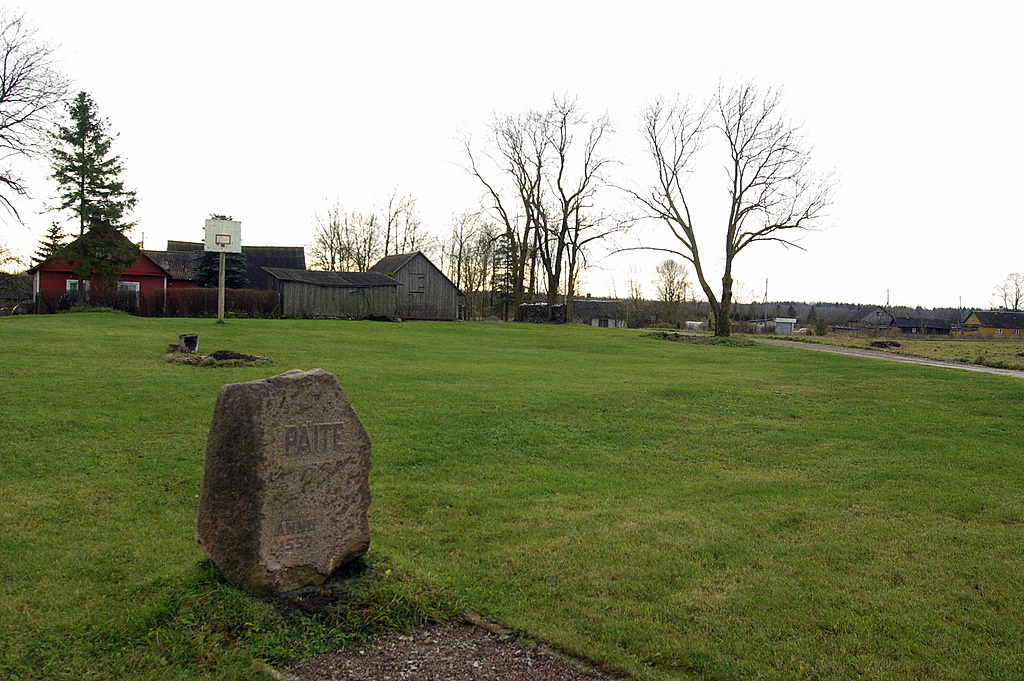
- Päite village square

- Location in Estonia
- Coordinates: 59°23′46″N 27°41′35″E
- Country: Estonia
- County: Ida-Viru County
- Municipality: Toila Parish

Population (2011 Census)
  - Total: 22

Päite is a village in Toila Parish, Ida-Viru County in northeastern Estonia. It is located just west of the town of Sillamäe. As of the 2011 census, the settlement's population was 22, of which the Estonians were 11 (50.0%).

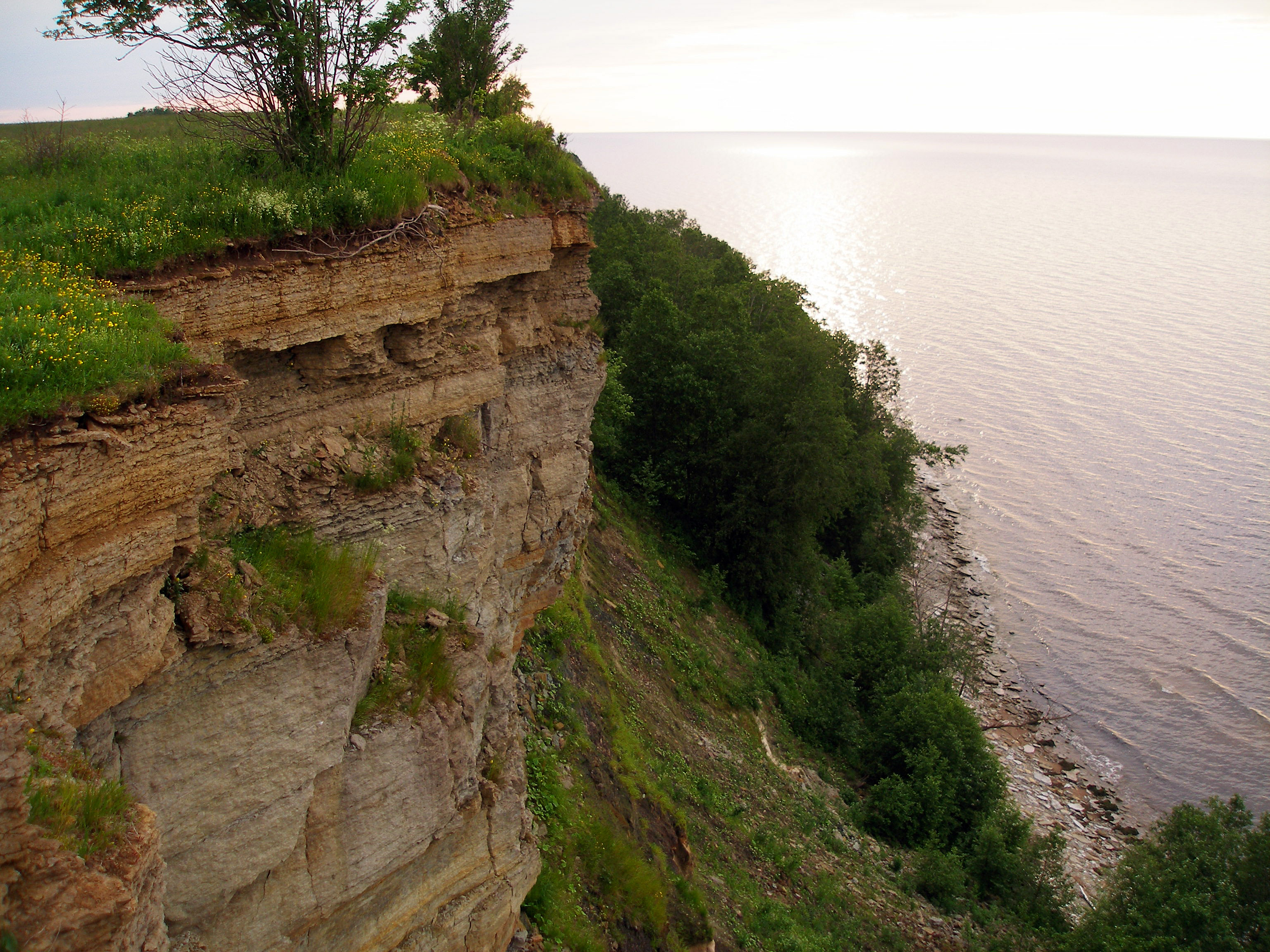
Päite cliff, part of the Baltic Klint

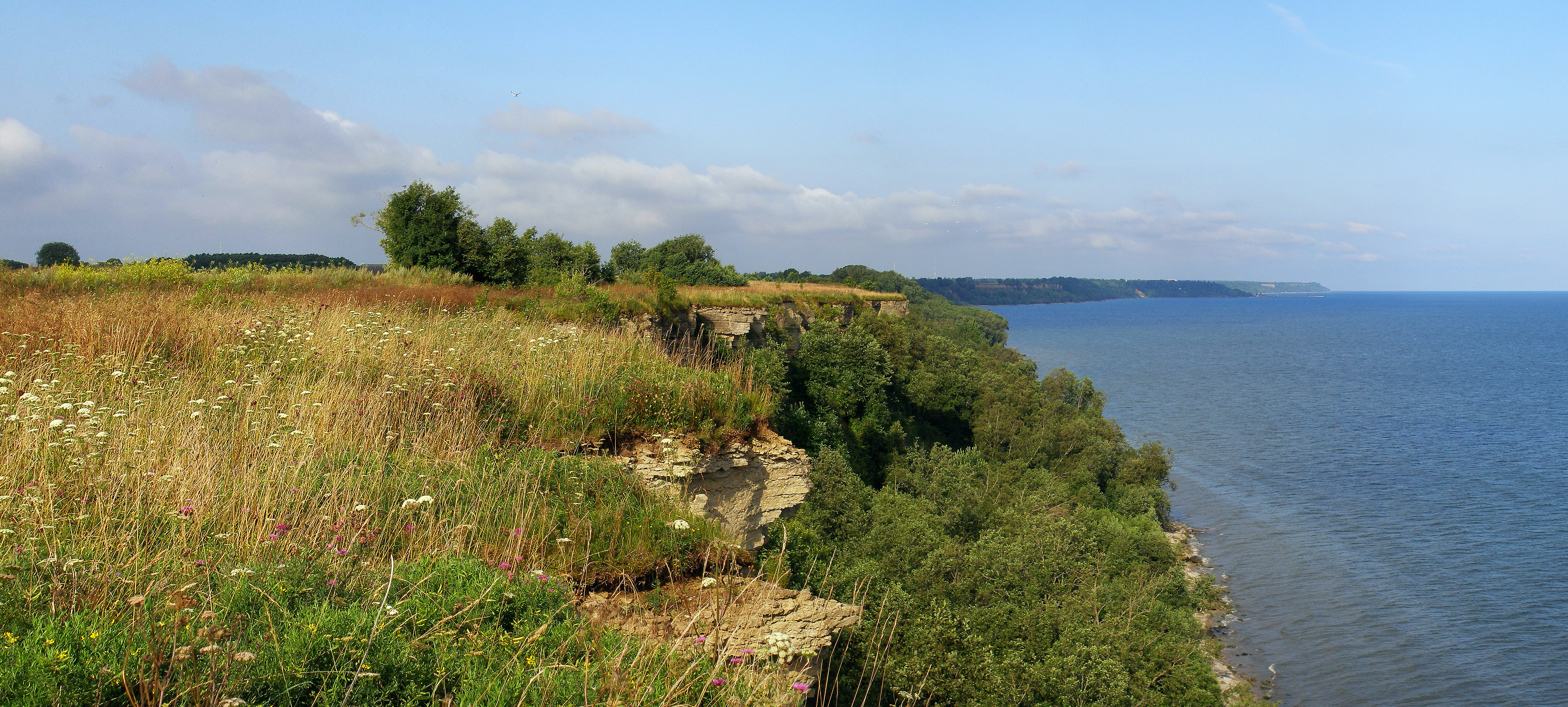
