= Tõrvajõgi =

River in Estonia

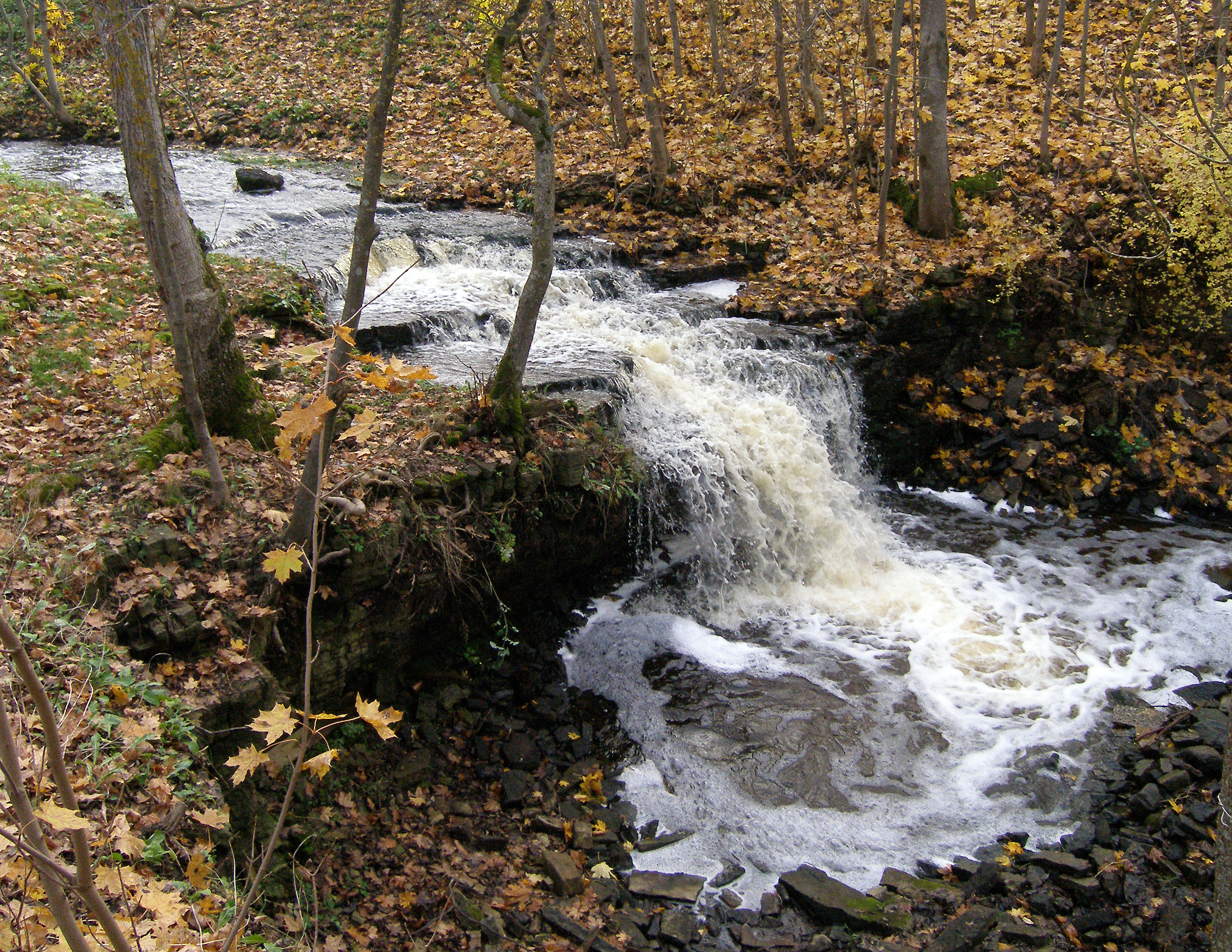

Location
- Country: Estonia

Physical characteristics
- Mouth: Narva River
  - coordinates: 59°25′49″N 28°07′42″E
- Length: 16.1 km (10.0 mi)
- Basin size: 43.7 km^{2} (16.9 sq mi)

The Tõrvajõgi is a river in Ida-Viru County, Estonia. The river is 16.1 km long, and its basin size is 43.7 km^{2}. It discharges into the Narva River. Tõrvajõgi Falls is located on the river.

The name Tõrvajõgi means 'tar river' (from Estonian tõrv 'tar'), referring to the dark color of the water.
