= Kohtla =

Village in Estonia

- Village
- Location in Estonia
- Coordinates: 59°21′06″N 27°12′45″E
- Country: Estonia
- County: Ida-Viru County
- Municipality: Toila Parish
- First mentioned: 1419

Population (01.01.2010)
  - Total: 79

Kohtla (German: Kochtel) is a village in Toila Parish, Ida-Viru County in northeastern Estonia, located just south of the city of Kohtla-Järve and east of Kohtla-Nõmme borough. It has a population of 78 (as of 1 January 2010).

Before the 2017 Administrative Reform, the village belonged to Kohtla Parish.

In the 13th century on the site of Kohtla there was Odre village with the size of 18 carucates. Kohtla Manor (Kochtel) was first mentioned in 1419. From 1750 to 1919 it belonged to the von Stackelberg. The building was burned down in 1941 during World War II.

Chess grandmaster Lembit Oll (1966–1999) originated from Kohtla-Vanaküla.

Preceding station	Elron	Following station
Püssi towards Tallinn	Tallinn–Narva	Jõhvi towards Narva
