= Kohtla-Nõmme =

Borough in Estonia

- Borough
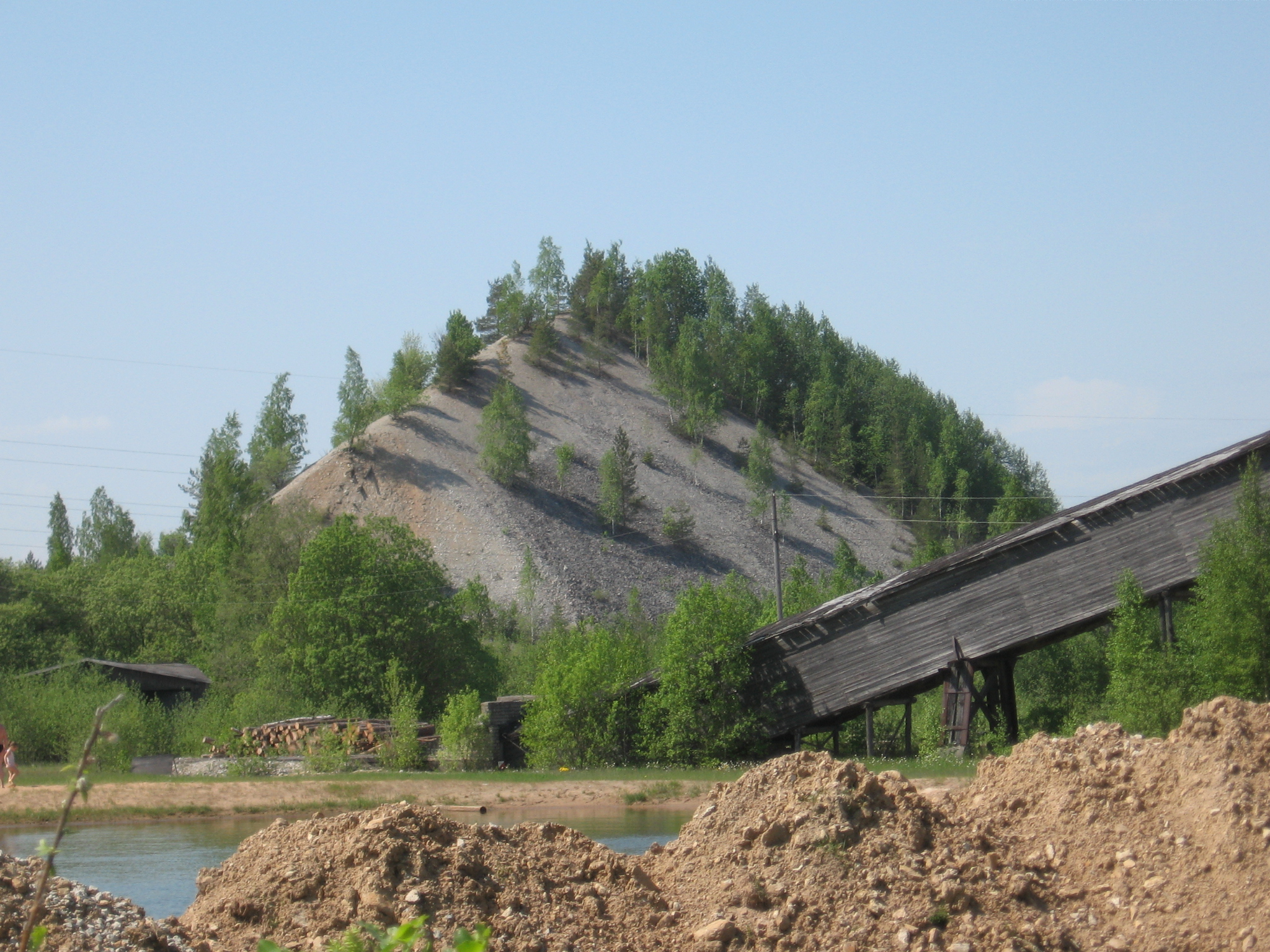

- Location in Estonia
- Coordinates: 59°21′14″N 27°11′31″E
- Country: Estonia
- County: Ida-Viru County
- Municipality: Toila Parish

Area
  - Total: 4.1 km^{2} (1.6 sq mi)

Population (31.12.2021)
  - Total: 886
  - Density: 220/km^{2} (560/sq mi)

Kohtla-Nõmme is a borough (Estonian: alev) in Jõhvi Parish, in Ida-Viru County, in northeastern Estonia. It had a population of 886 (as of 31 December 2021) and an area of 4.1 km²

In the 1930s, New Consolidated Gold Fields opened a shale oil extraction complex at Kohtla-Nõmme. In 1937, the company opened the Kohtla underground mine. After the occupation of Estonia by the Soviet Union, the company was nationalized in 1940. The Kohtla-Nõmme shale oil extraction complex continued to operate until 1961. The underground mine stayed operational until 2001. After that the Estonian Mining Museum was opened at the site.

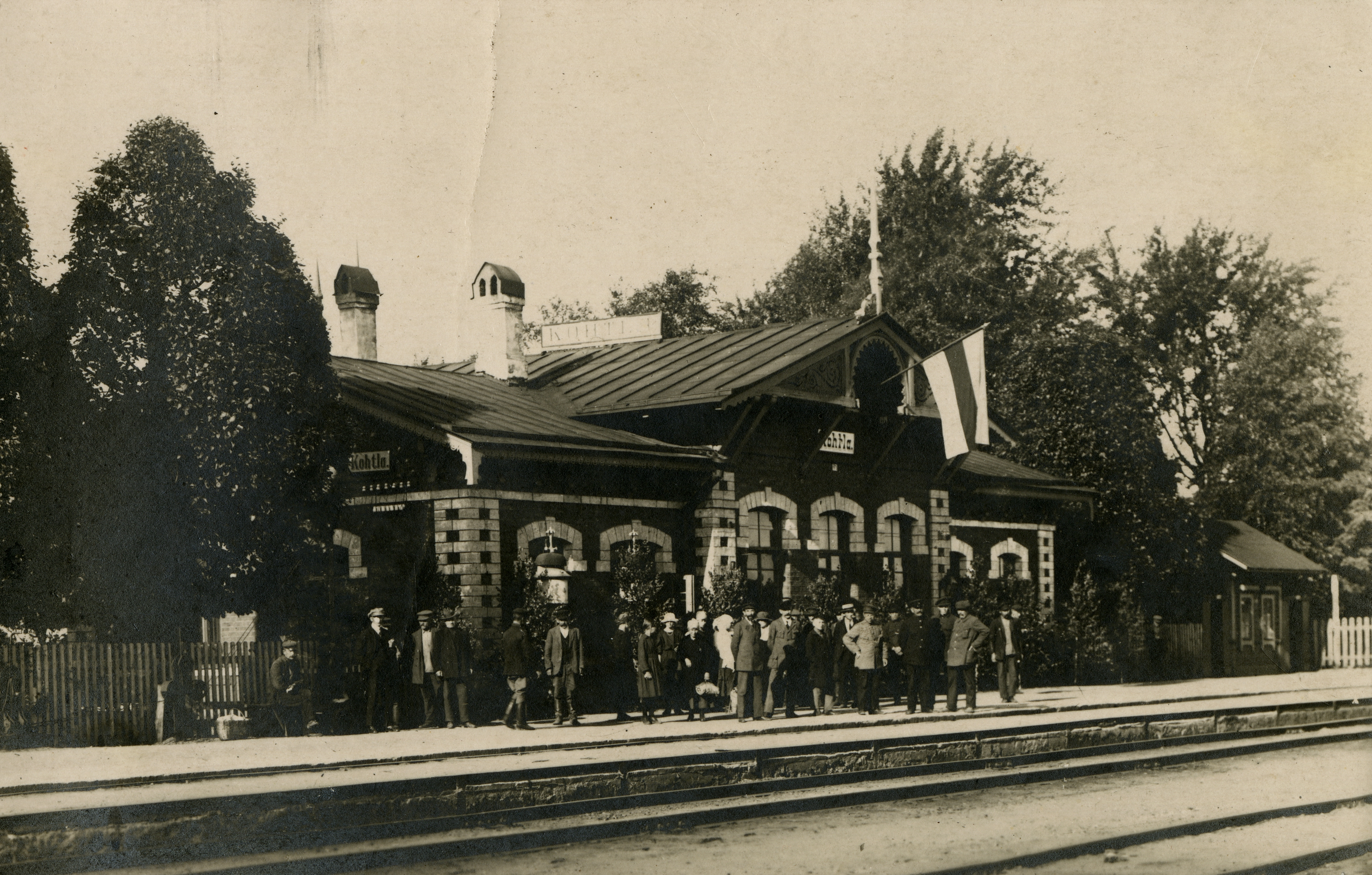
Kohtla railway station, destroyed in WWII

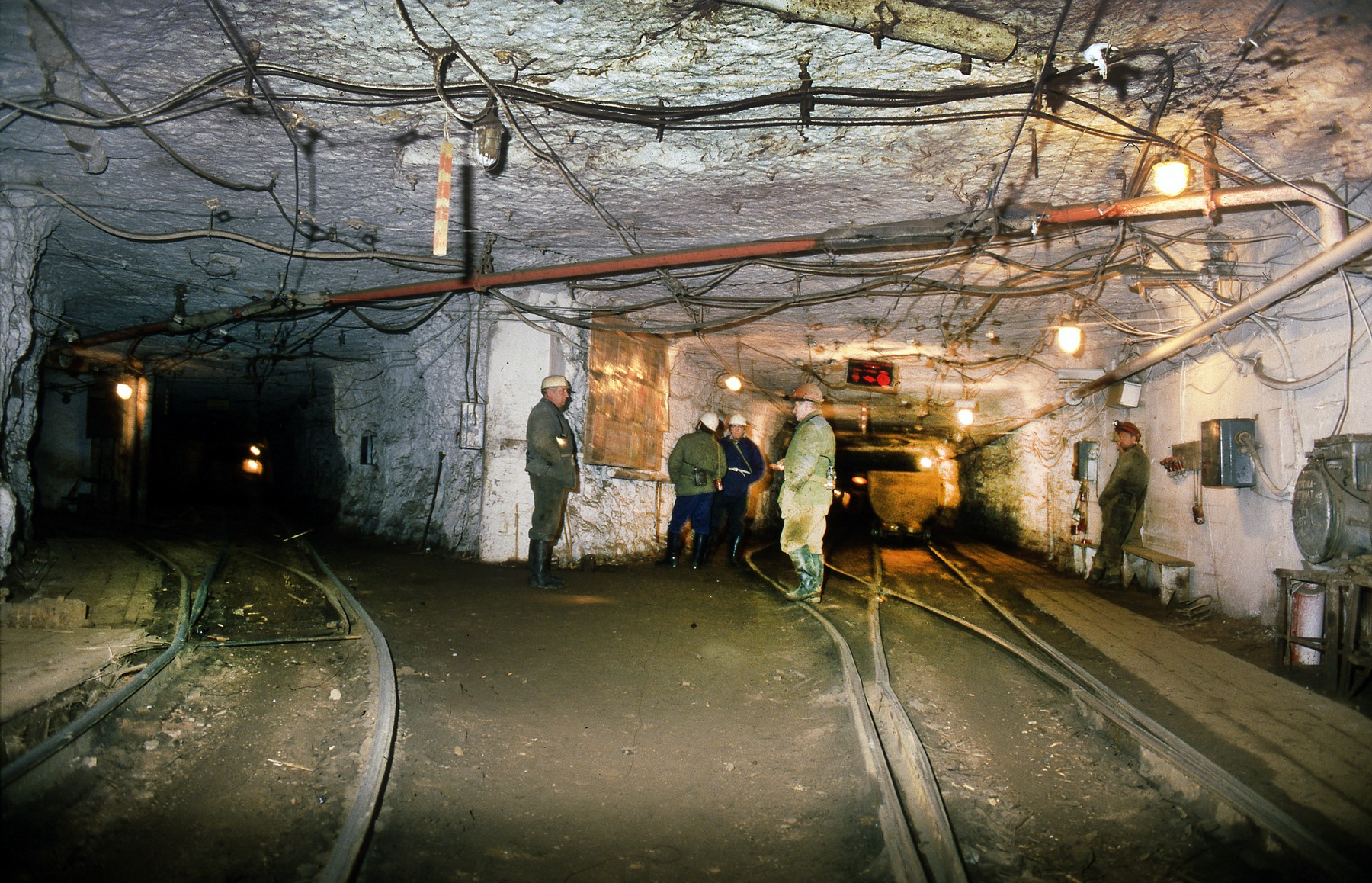
Kohtla mine in 1994

360° panorama of the Estonian Mining Museum

== See also ==
- New Consolidated Gold Fields
- Kohtla-Nõmme TV Mast
