= Valaste Falls =

Waterfall in Estonia

- Interactive map of Valaste Falls
- Location: Ida-Viru County, Estonia
- Coordinates: 59.443889°N 27.335278°E
- Type: Plunge
- Elevation: 42 m (138 ft)
- Total height: 30 metres (98 ft)
- Number of drops: 1

Valaste Falls (Estonian: Valaste juga) is the highest waterfall in Estonia and neighboring regions (30.5 meters or 100 feet). It is located between Ontika and Valaste in Jõhvi Parish of Ida-Viru County and is formed by Valaste Creek (Estonian: Valaste oja) as it flows over the Baltic Klint not far from the shore of the Gulf of Finland. It is a popular tourist attraction, with its spray freezing up in winter.

The site has a parking lot, some explanatory signs, and a trail using a double spiral staircase to reach the bottom of the cliff. Opposite the waterfall, a viewing platform has been built, and this offers views of the falls.

The platform was taken out of service and the stairs to it were closed in 2013. A new staircase with platforms and walkways to the shore of the Gulf of Finland was built and opened to the public in 2018.

== Gallery ==
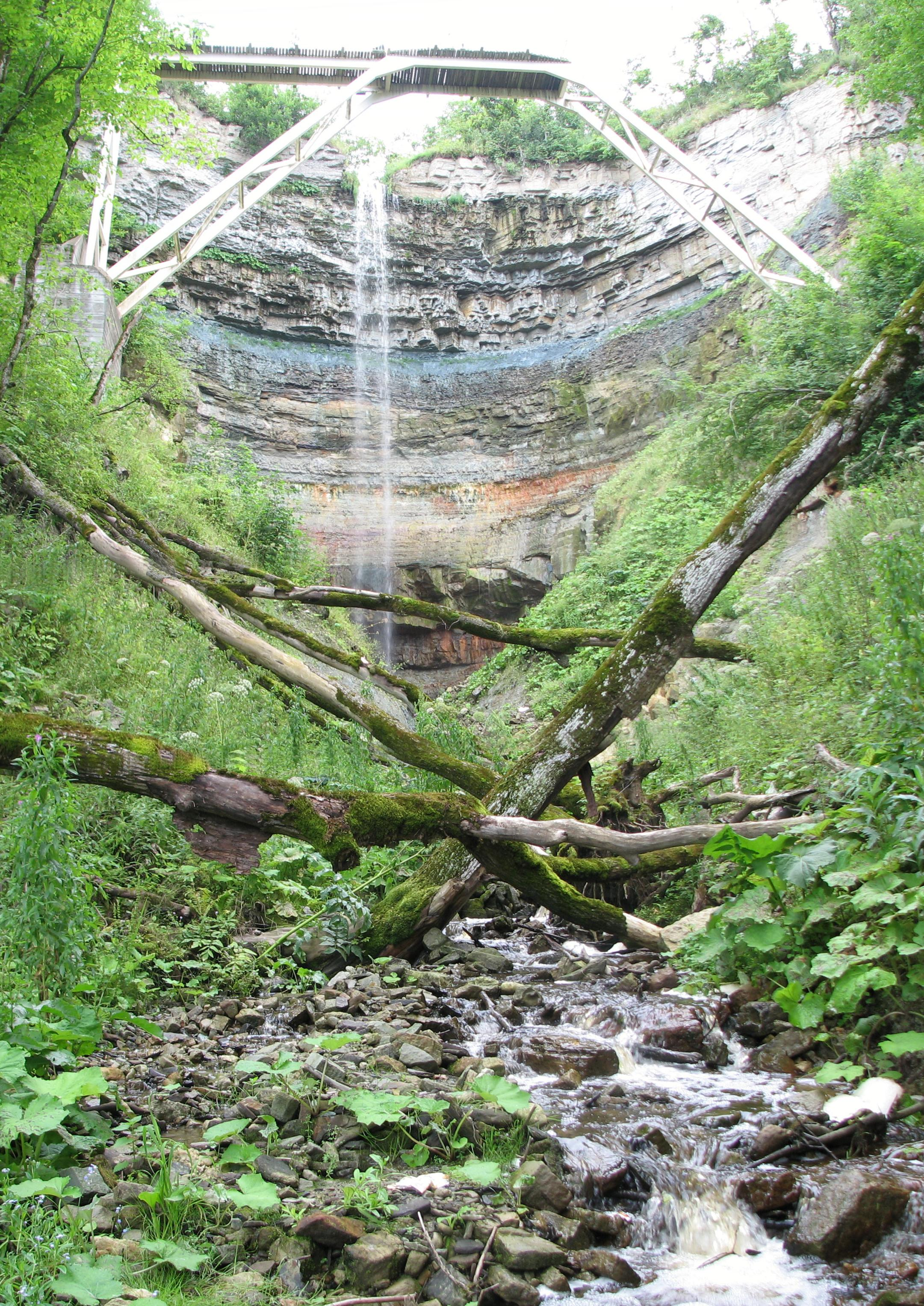

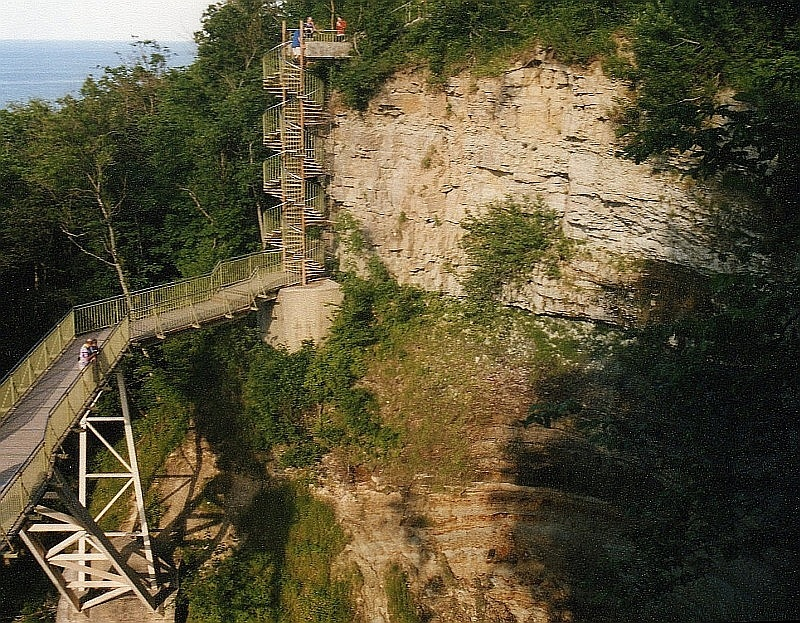

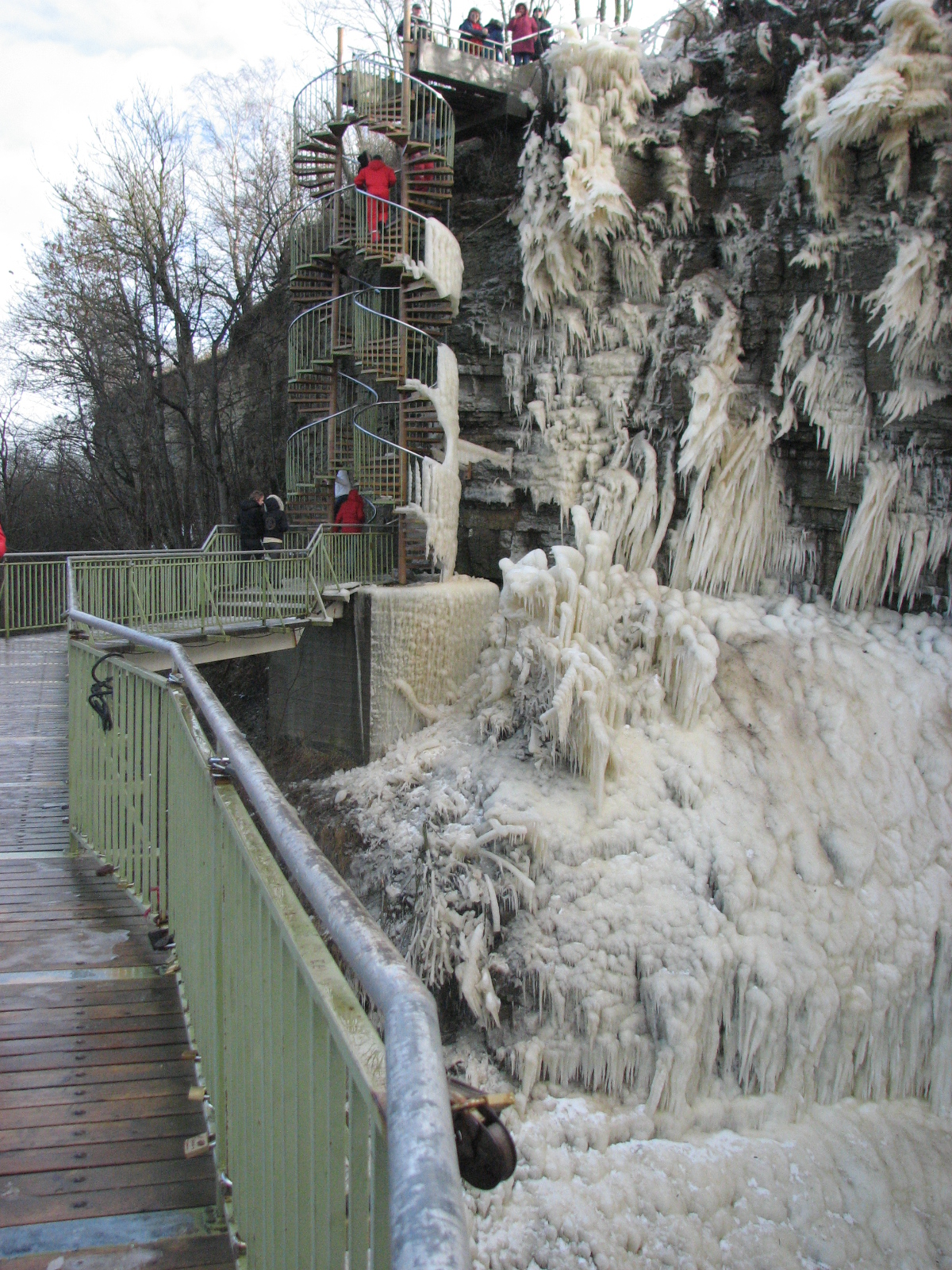
In winter

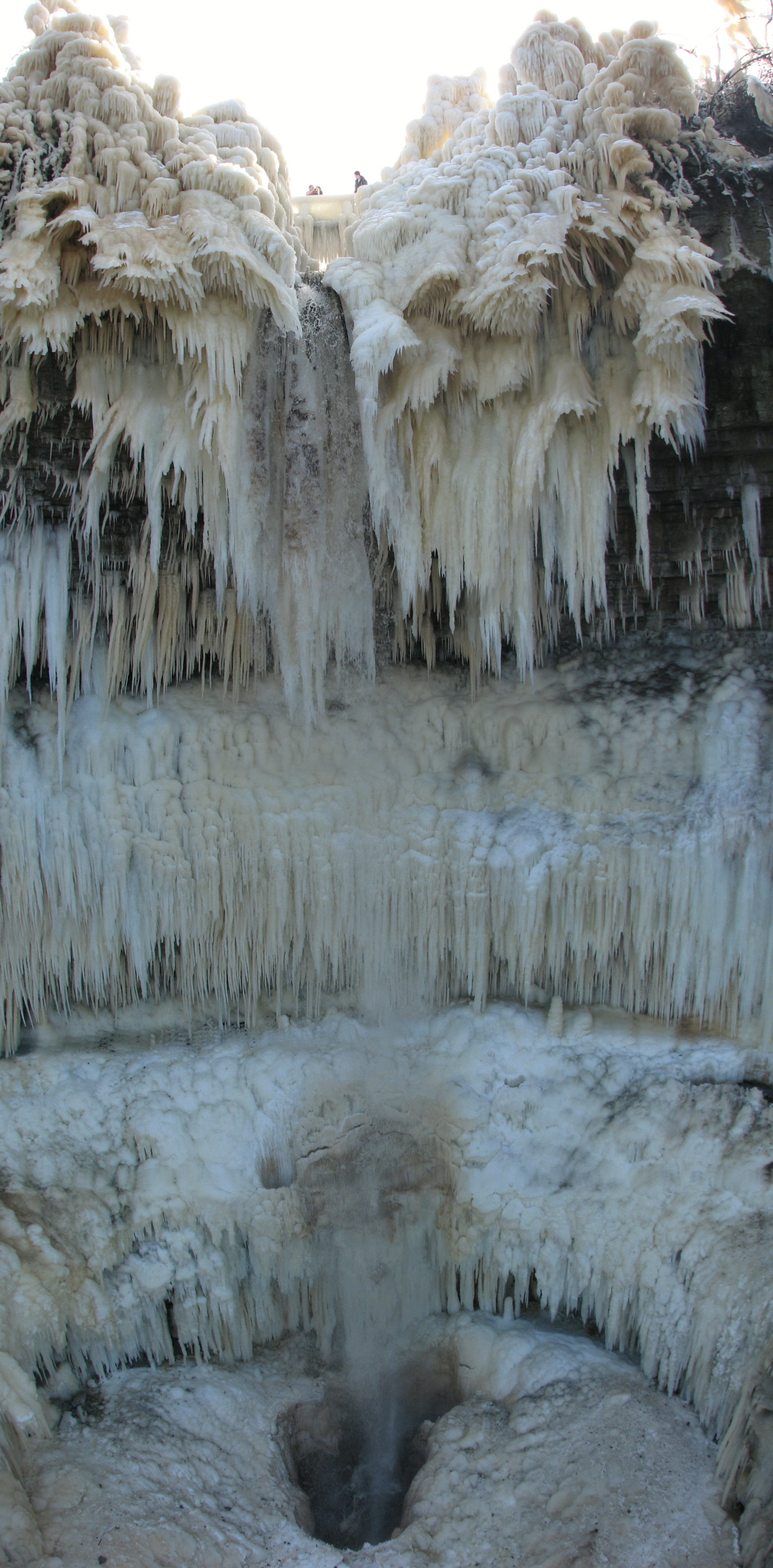

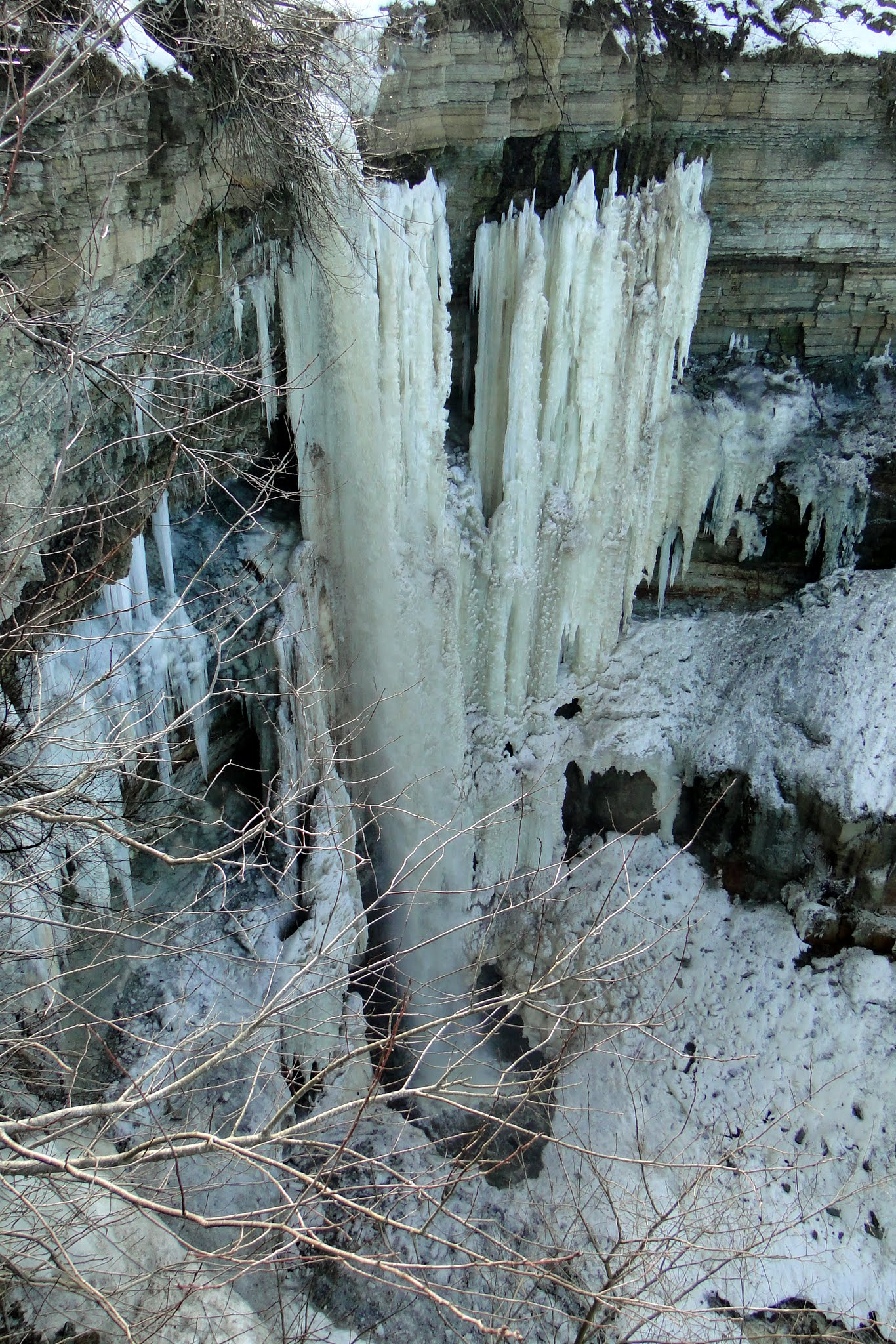
Valaste Falls in winter

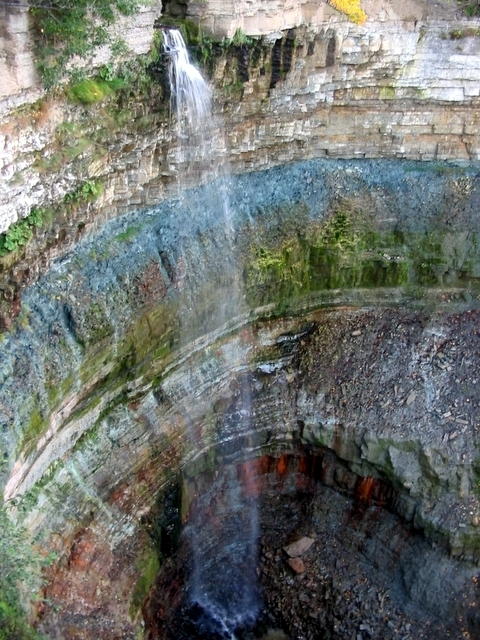

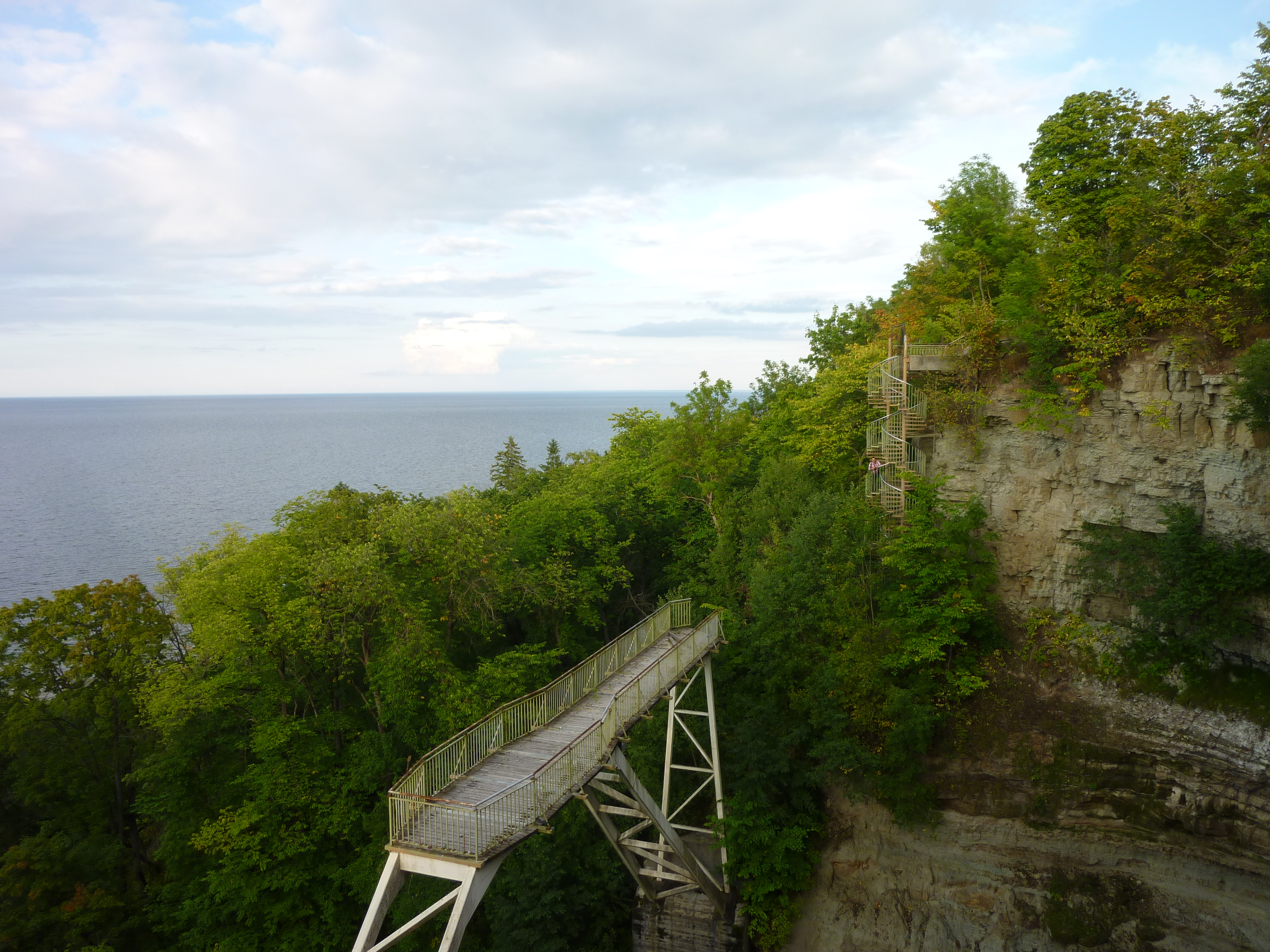
Broken platform

== See also ==
- List of waterfalls
