= Pühajõe =

Village in Estonia

Coordinates: 59°25′N 27°32′E

- Village
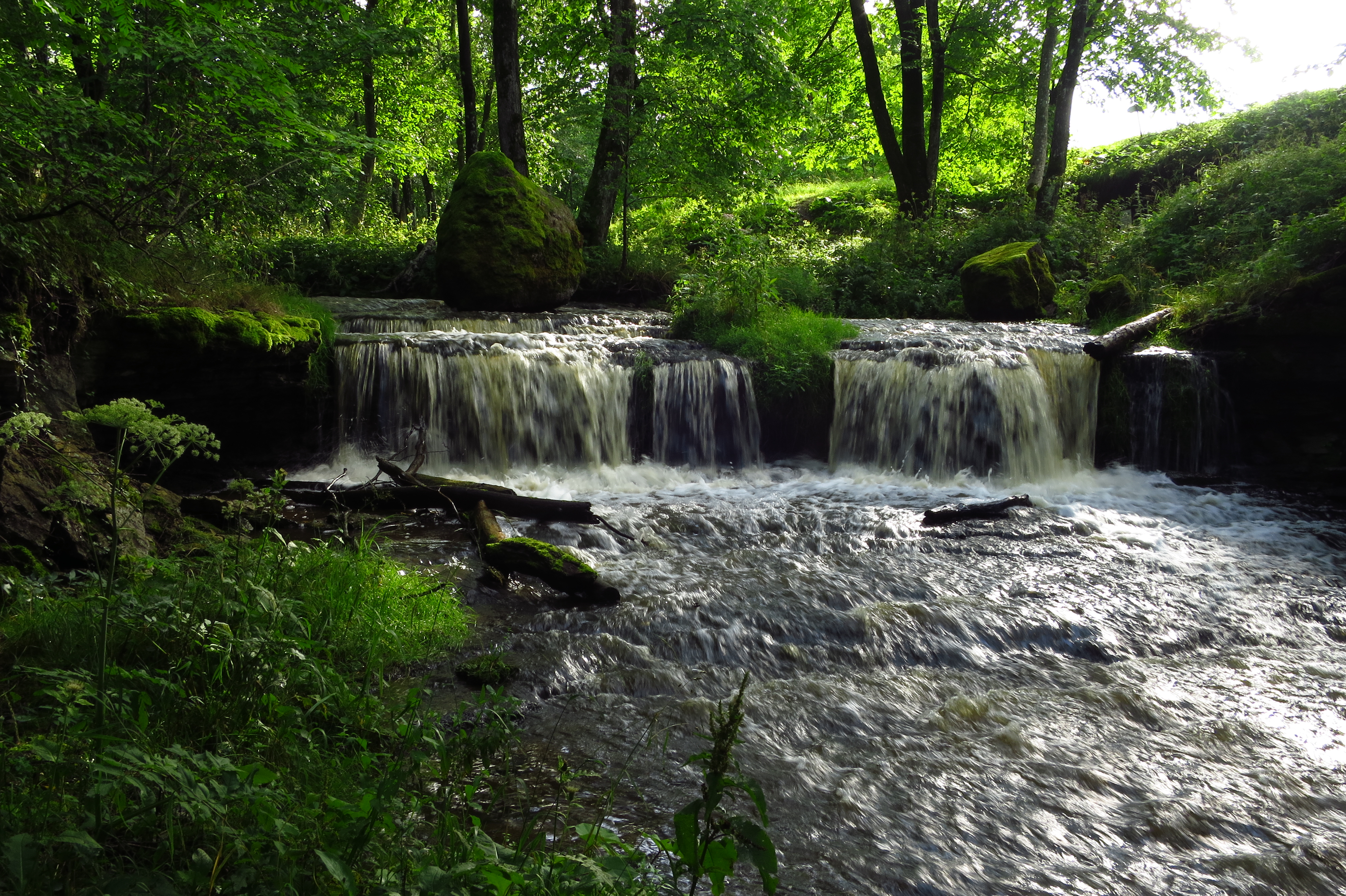
- Aluoja Falls in Pühajõe
- Interactive map of Pühajõe
- Country: Estonia
- County: Ida-Viru County
- Parish: Toila Parish
- Time zone: UTC+2 (EET)
  - Summer (DST): UTC+3 (EEST)

Pühajõe (German: Pühhajöggi) is a village in Toila Parish, Ida-Viru County in northeastern Estonia.

Aluoja Falls is located in Pühajõe village.
