= Toila Parish =

Municipality in Estonia

Coordinates: 59°25′N 27°30′E

Toila Parish Toila vald
- Municipality of Estonia
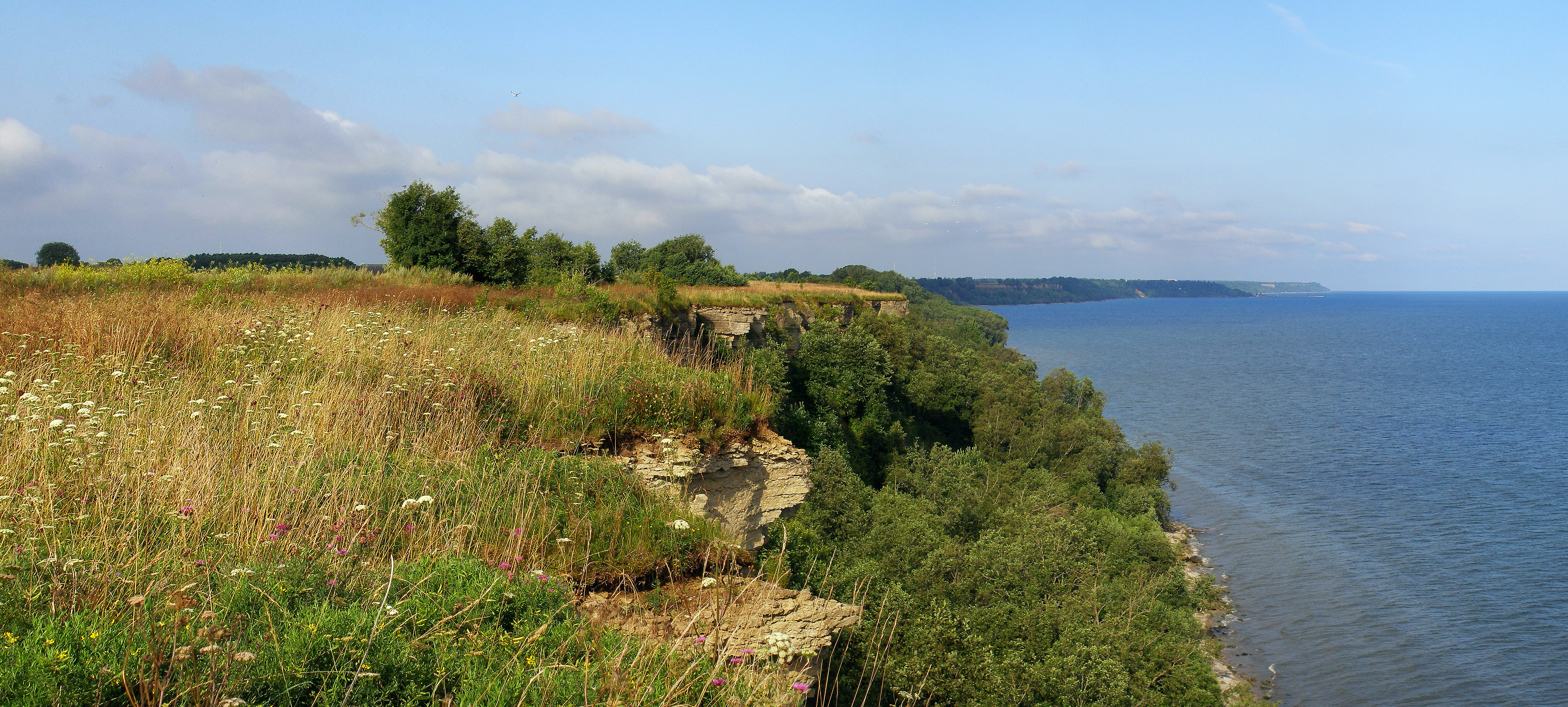
- Päite cliff

- Flag Coat of arms

- Toila Parish within Ida-Viru County.
- Country: Estonia
- County: Ida-Viru County
- Administrative centre: Toila

Area
  - Total: 266 km^{2} (103 sq mi)

Population (2019)
  - Total: 4,735
  - Density: 17.8/km^{2} (46.1/sq mi)
- ISO 3166 code: EE-803
- Website: www.toila.ee

Toila Parish (Estonian: Toila vald) was an Estonian municipality located in Ida-Viru County. It had a population of 4,735 (2019) and an area of 266 km².

== History ==
Toila Parish was formed in the course of the 2017 administrative reform of Estonian municipalities by the merger of Kohtla-Nõmme borough, the former Toila Parish and Kohtla Parish.

Originally, it was also planned to join Jõhvi municipality. At the end of 2022, the municipalities of Toila and Jõhvi started accession talks again.

Toila Parish has merged with Jõhvi Parish as of the 28th of November 2025.

== Settlements ==
Toila Parish had one borough (Kohtla-Nõmme), two small boroughs (Toila and Voka), and 27 villages.

=== Villages ===
Altküla - Amula - Järve - Kaasikaia - Kaasikvälja - Kabelimetsa - Kohtla - Kohtla-Uueküla - Konju - Kukruse - Martsa - Metsamägara - Mõisamaa - Ontika - Paate - Päite - Peeri - Pühajõe - Roodu - Saka - Servaääre - Täkumetsa - Uikala - Vaivina - Valaste - Vitsiku - Voka

Religion in Toila Parish (2021)
1. Unaffiliated (74.9%)
2. Orthodox (16.1%)
3. Lutheran (7.20%)
4. Others Christians (0.10%)
5. Unknown (1.80%)
6. 0.00%

== Notable people ==
- Carl Sarap (1893 in Voka – 1942), editor and photographer.
- Karl Orviku (1903 in Kohtla – 1981), geologist, specialized in quaternary geology
- Kaljo Kiisk (1925 in Vaivina – 2007), actor, film director, screenwriter and politician.
