= Kohtla Parish =

Former municipality of Estonia

Coordinates: 59°21′N 27°11′E

Kohtla Parish Kohtla vald
- Former municipality of Estonia
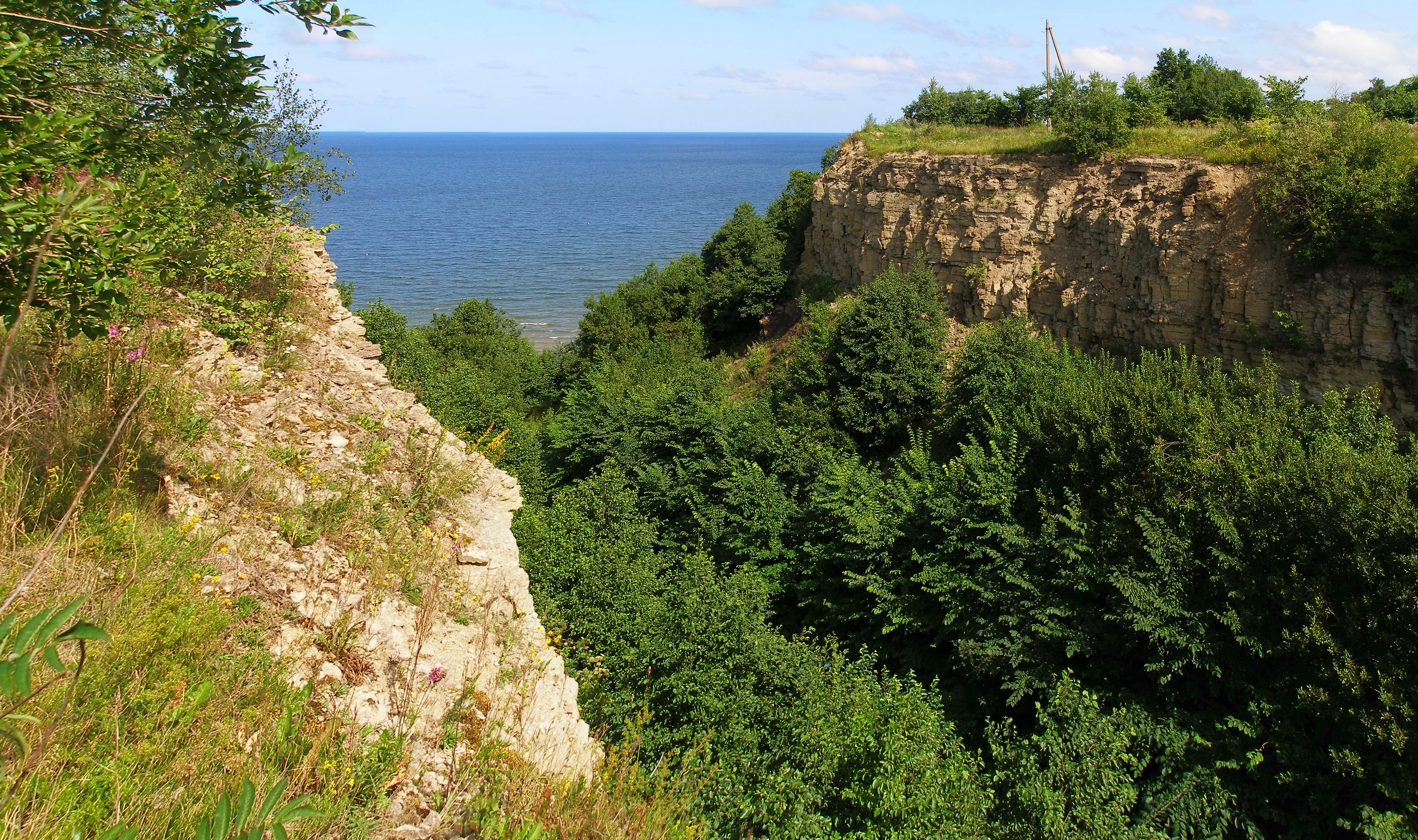
- Baltic Klint near Saka

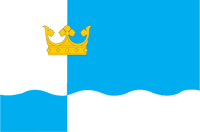
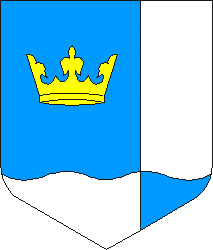
- Flag Coat of arms

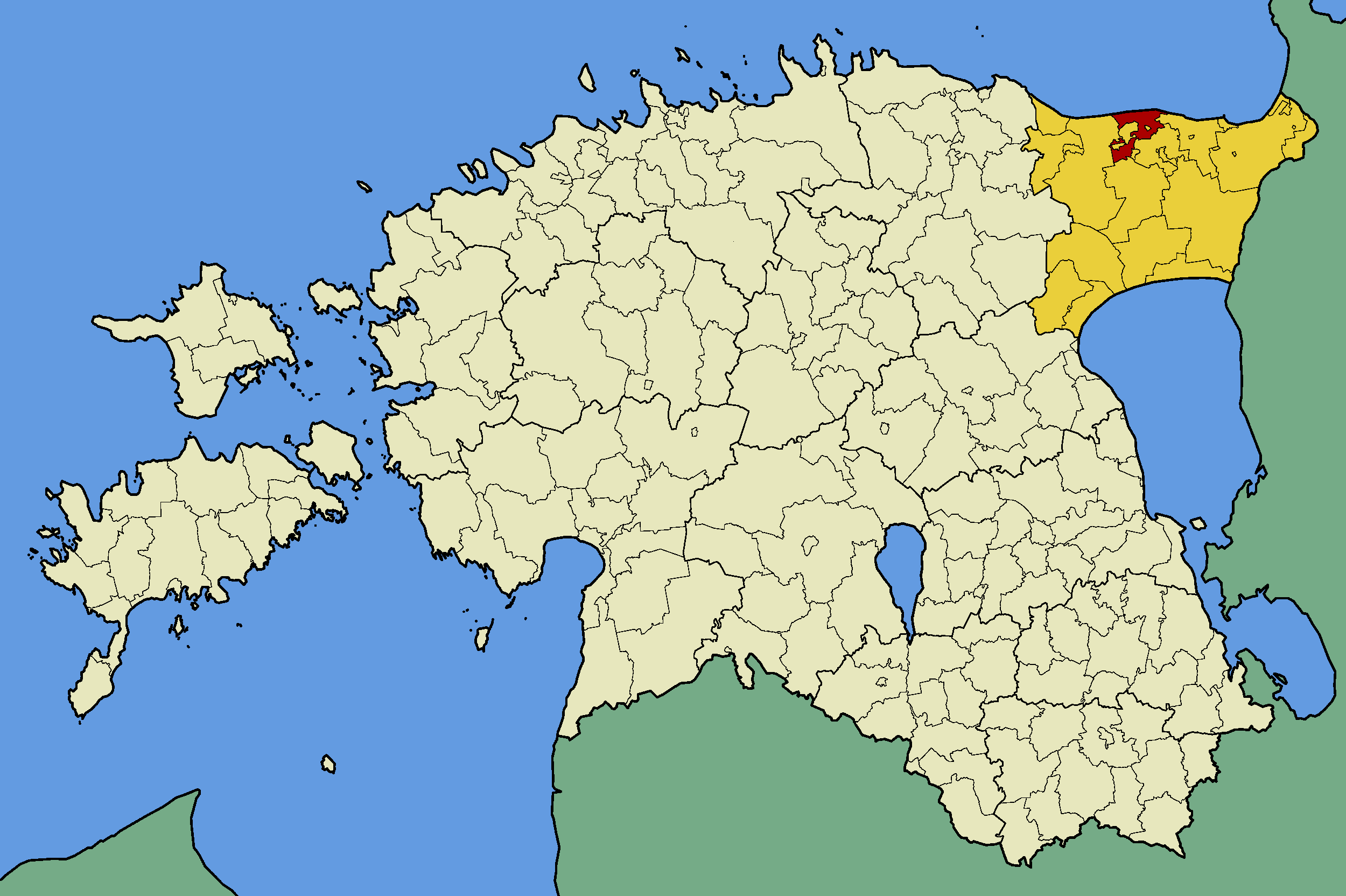
- Kohtla Parish within Ida-Viru County.
- Country: Estonia
- County: Ida-Viru County
- Administrative centre: Järve

Area
  - Total: 101 km^{2} (39 sq mi)

Population
  - Total: 1,640
  - Density: 16.2/km^{2} (42.1/sq mi)
- Website: www.kohtlavv.ee

Kohtla Parish (Estonian: Kohtla vald) was an Estonian municipality located in Ida-Viru County. It has a population of 1640 (2014) and an area of 101 km^{2}.

== Villages ==
Amula, Järve, Kaasikaia, Kaasikvälja, Kabelimetsa, Kohtla, Kukruse, Mõisamaa, Ontika, Paate, Peeri, Roodu, Saka, Servaääre, Täkumetsa, Valaste, Vitsiku.
