= Baltic Klint =

Escarpment in Sweden, Estonia, and Russia

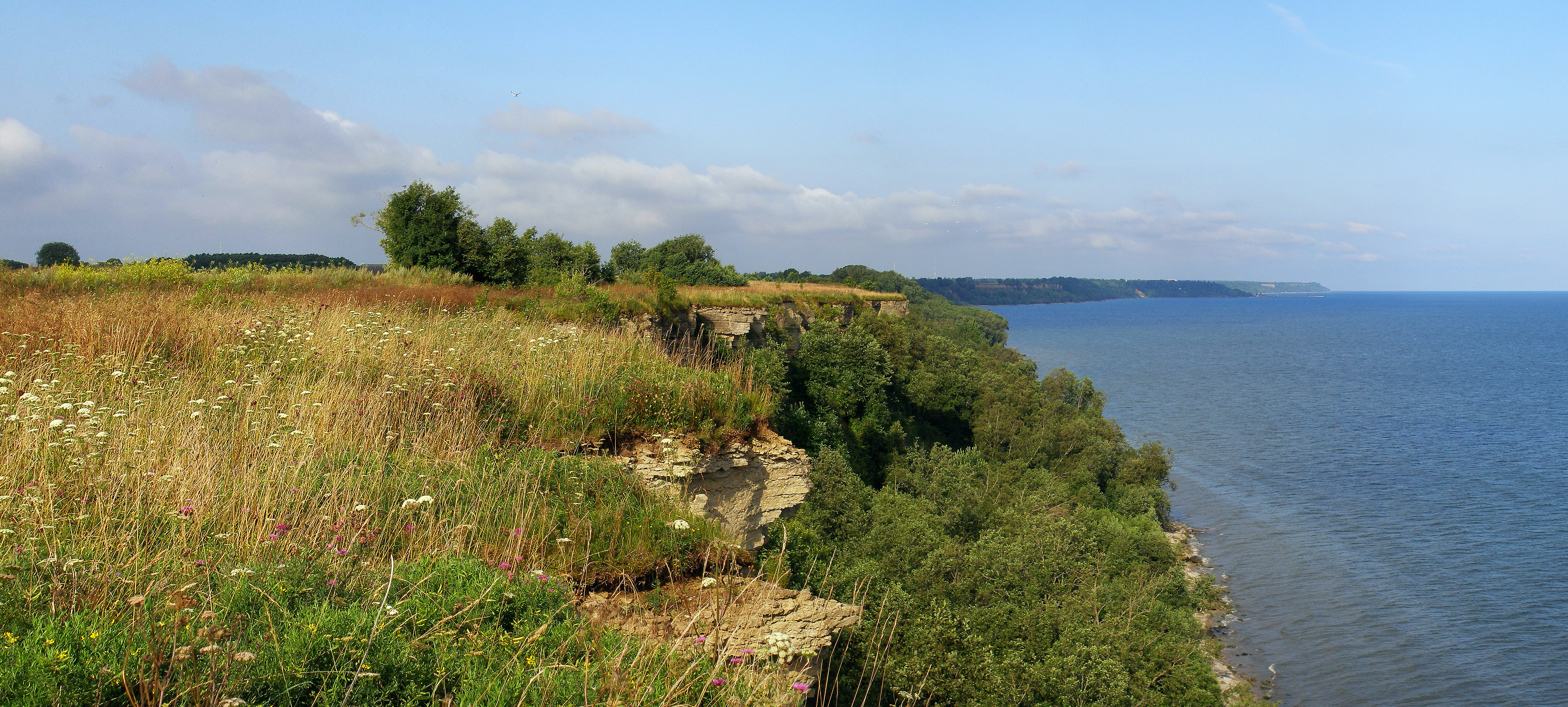
The Baltic Klint in Ida-Viru County, Estonia

The Baltic Klint (Clint, Glint; Estonian: Balti klint, Swedish: Baltiska klinten, Russian: Балтийско-Ладожский уступ, Глинт) is an erosional limestone escarpment and cuesta in the Baltic region, situated in Estonia, Russia's Leningrad Oblast and the Swedish islands of Gotland and Öland. It was featured on the reverse of the 50 krooni note of 1928 and on the 100 krooni note of 1992.

The Baltic Klint is active landform showing some retreat in the present. However it is not known to which degree the Baltic Klint originated in postglacial time or if it evolved from cliff-like forms sculpted by the Fennoscandian Ice Sheet. In Gotland 20th century cliff retreat rates have been estimated at 0.15 to 0.78 cm/year. Retreat of the Baltic Klint in Gotland has widened shore platforms.

== Geography ==
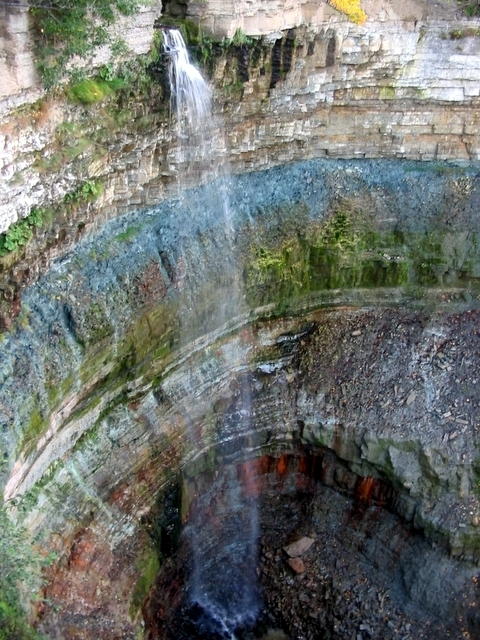
Valaste Falls

The Baltic Klint extends approximately 1200 km from the island of Öland in Sweden through the continental shelf and the Estonian islands of Osmussaar and Suur-Pakri to Paldiski, then along the southern shore of the Gulf of Finland and Neva River to the area south of Lake Ladoga in Russia, where it disappears under younger sedimentary deposits.

The cliff reaches 55.6 m above sea level at its highest at Ontika, Kohtla Parish, Ida-Viru County of Estonia. It is cut by numerous rivers (including the Narva, Luga, Izhora and the Tosna), many of which form waterfalls and rapids. Valaste Falls (in Kohtla Parish) with a drop of 25 m is the highest.

In Öland and Gotland a series of sea stacks known as rauks exist along the klint. In the case of Gotland, rauks are formed in limestone representing reefs that existed in the Silurian epoch. As waves batter against limestone cliffs, pre-existing vertical fractures begin to erode and widen. Eventually this leads to the formation of caves that merge with the remaining central rockmass, becoming a rauk. Areas with particularly high concentrations of rauks are Fårö in northern Gotland and Byrum in northwestern Öland. While some rauks occur next to, or as part of cliffs, some have a more tenuous relation to the cliff and some lack a relation altogether.

== See also ==
- Ivangorod Fortress
- Geology of the Baltic Sea
- Geology of Gotland
- Sub-Cambrian peneplain
