= Fyodor Litke (icebreaker) =

Fyodor Litke may refer to one of the following icebreakers named after Friedrich Benjamin von Lütke (Fyodor Petrovich Litke):

- Fyodor Litke (1909), a Russian and later Soviet icebreaker built in 1909 as CGC Earl Grey and sold to Russia in 1914.
- Fyodor Litke (1970), a Soviet diesel-electric icebreaker built in 1970.
