= Avanduse =

Village in Estonia

Coordinates: 59°03′N 26°25′E

- Village
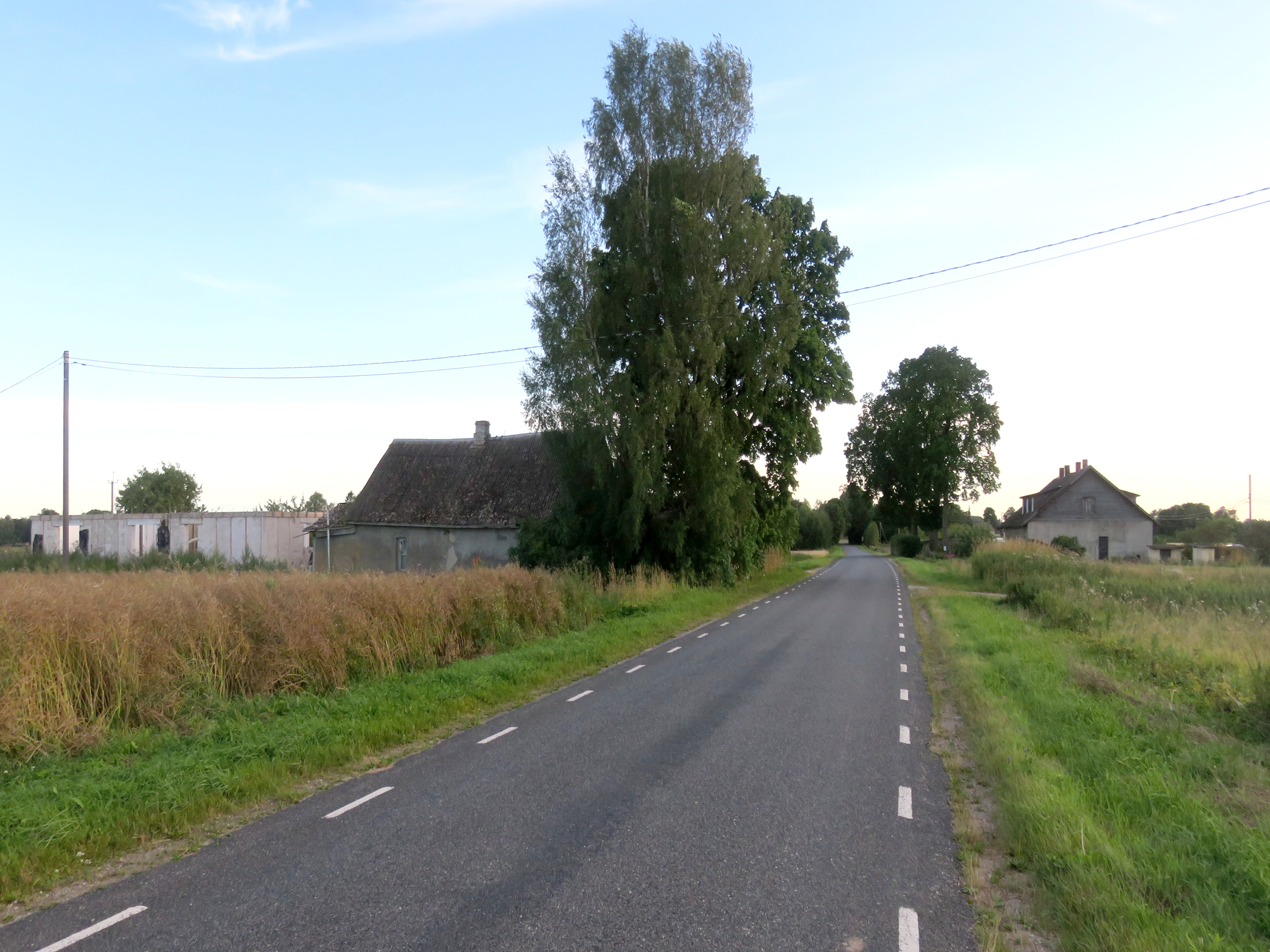
- Interactive map of Avanduse
- Country: Estonia
- County: Lääne-Viru County
- Parish: Väike-Maarja Parish
- Time zone: UTC+2 (EET)
  - Summer (DST): UTC+3 (EEST)

Avanduse (German: Awandus) is a village in Väike-Maarja Parish, Lääne-Viru County, in northeastern Estonia. Until 2005, there existed Avanduse Parish, the center of which was Simuna.

There is a manor in Avanduse, owned by, among others, navigator and explorer Friedrich von Lütke.

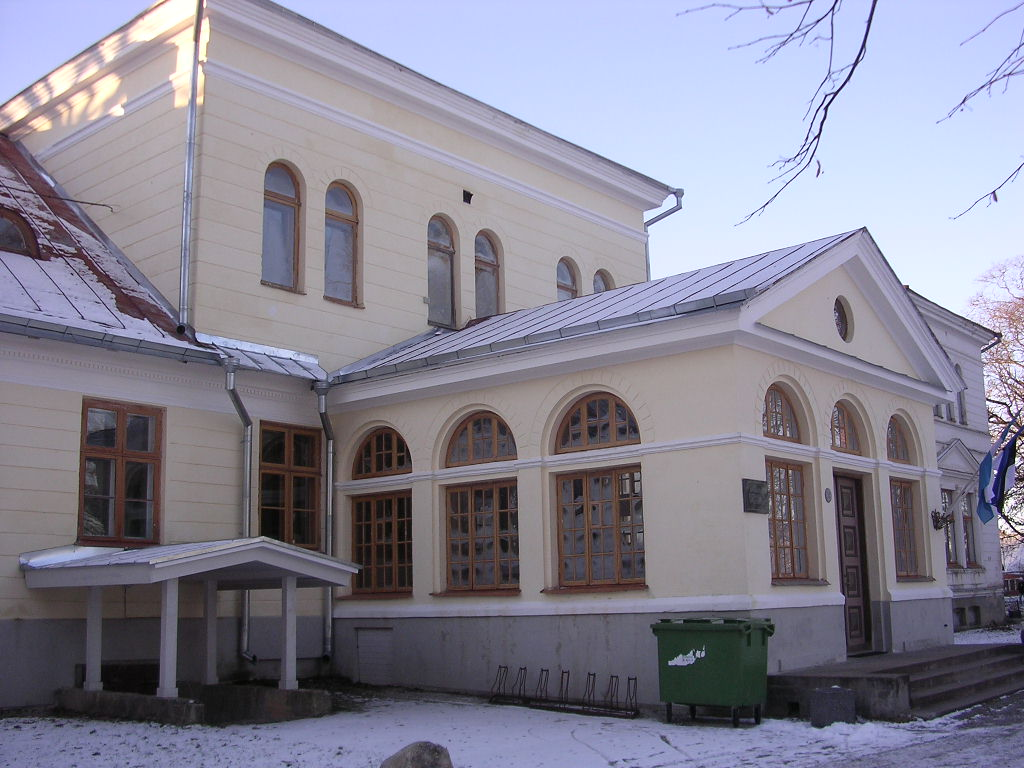
Avanduse manor house

Name

Avanduse was attested in historical sources as Auendoys in 1241, Avendes in 1494, and Катко (Авандусъ) in 1900. The Finnish linguist Lauri Kettunen compared the name to the common noun avandus (genitive: avanduse) 'open place; hole (cut) in the ice' and Finnish avanto 'hole (cut) in the ice'. The name Катко in the 1900 attestation refers to Katkuküla, the original village name at the site of today's Avanduse (which referred to what is now Simuna). The name Katkuküla is derived from katk (genitive: katku) 'quagmire' plus küla 'village'.
