= Toila =

Borough in Estonia

- Small borough
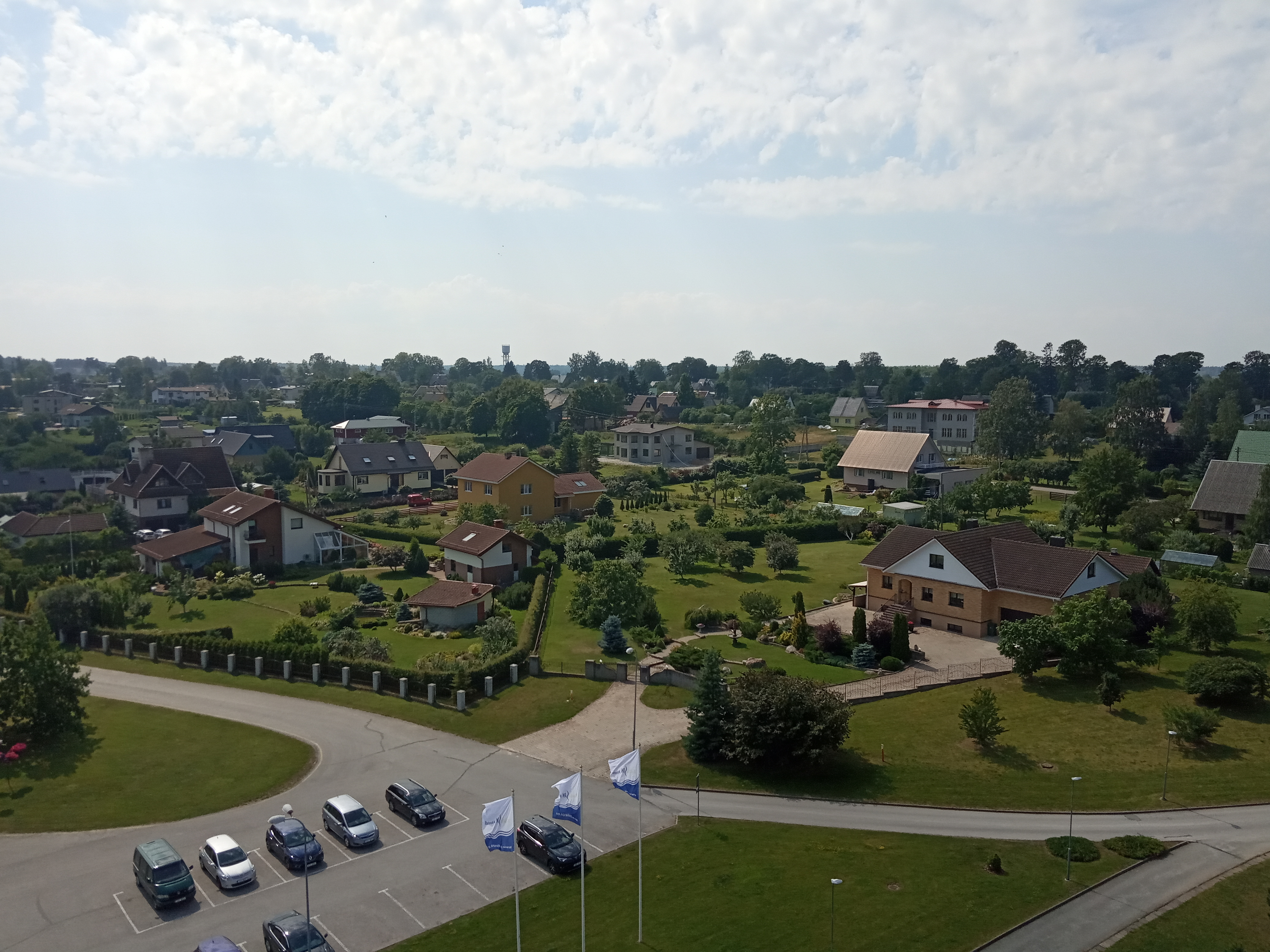

- Location in Estonia
- Coordinates: 59°25′14″N 27°30′35″E
- Country: Estonia
- County: Ida-Viru County
- Municipality: Toila Parish

Population (2011 Census)
  - Total: 780

Toila is a small borough (alevik) in Ida-Viru County, in northeastern Estonia. It is located about 10 km (6 mi) northeast of the town of Jõhvi, on the coast of Narva Bay (part of the Gulf of Finland). Toila is known as an important sea resort in Estonia, with a spa hotel, beach and a park (Oru Park). Toila is the administrative centre of Toila Parish. As of the 2011 Census, the settlement's population was 780, of whom the ethnic Estonians made up 628 (80.5%).

== History ==
The existence of an ancient settlement in Toila is suggested by a sacred grove (hiis) on a high coastal cliff, offering springs along the Pühajõgi River, and an offering stone in Oru Park. The oldest tarand grave found in Virumaa is located beside the current Toila cemetery. The burials there took place in two periods: 2nd–4th and 7th–8th centuries AD.

The first written record about the Toila area, in the Danish Census Book, mentions neighbouring Pühajõe as a tiny hamlet with a size of 6 hides. In 1426, the neighbouring village of Kärilõpe (now Altküla) was first mentioned. In 1547, the site of modern Toila was mentioned as Männiku, where a knightly manor was situated.

During the Great Northern War, Russian cavalry general Boris Sheremetev built reduits around Pühajõgi, to hinder Charles XII in approaching the Battle of Narva.

Toila as a summer resort was discovered in the middle of the 19th century. The first tens of summer cottages were erected in the 1870s. In the second half of the century, a harbour was built in the estuary of the Pühajõgi River. Among locals, it became known as the "King's Jetty" (Kuninga muul). In 1914, the number of vacationers exceeded a thousand, while the number of residents was around 500. After World War I, the number of vacationers from Russia drastically decreased and Toila was used by only several hundred vacationers, mostly Estonian intellectuals.

At the end of the 19th century, Russian merchant Grigory Yeliseyev (who owned a store on the Nevsky Prospekt in St Petersburg) bought land for his new summer residence in Toila. A palace in the Italian renaissance style designed by Gavriil Baranovsky and a large park by Georg Kuphaldt were established. After being expropriated from its Russian owner, from 1934 to 1940, the palace, known as Oru Palace (in the neighbouring village of Pühajõe), was used as the summer residence of the first Estonian president, Konstantin Päts. The palace was destroyed in the Second World War.

== Notable people ==
- Konstantin Päts (1874–1956), president of Estonia, summered at Oru Castle from 1934 to 1940
- Igor Severyanin (1887–1941), Russian poet, summered in Toila from 1910 and lived there from 1918 until 1935
- Notable vacationers in Toila include:
  - Writers and poets: Valmar Adams, Artur Adson, Betti Alver, August Gailit, Jüri Parijõgi, Aleksis Rannit, Johannes Semper, Igor Severyanin, Friedebert Tuglas, Marie Under, Henrik Visnapuu
  - Actors: Leo Kalmet, Felix Moor, Netty Pinna, Paul Pinna, Salme Reek
  - Musicians: Artur Kapp, Jenny Siimon, Eduard Tubin, Aleksander Thomson
  - Artists: Johann Köler, Ado Vabbe
  - Cultural and political figures: Carl Robert Jakobson, Konstantin Päts, Jaan Poska

== Gallery ==
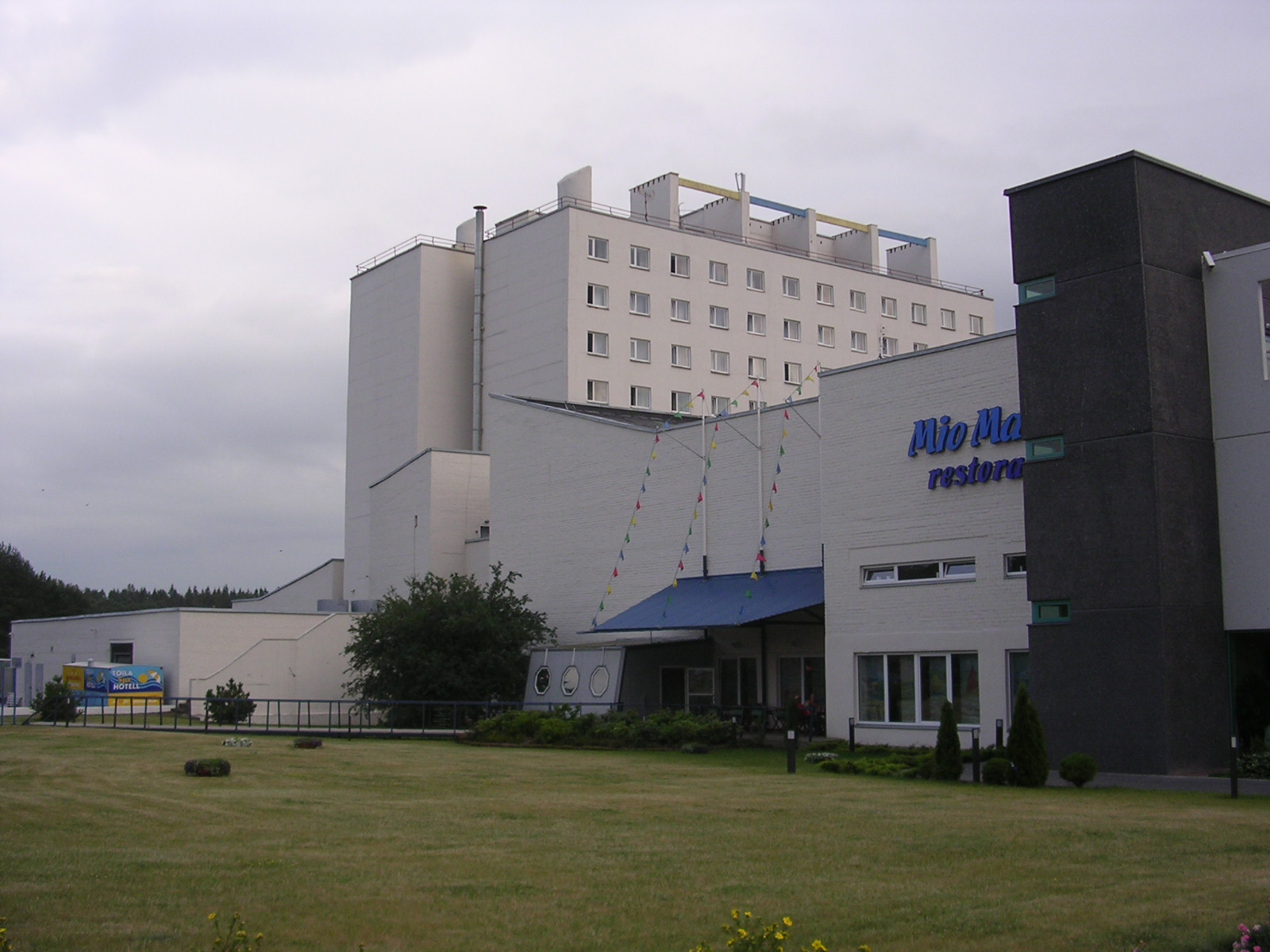
Toila Spa Hotel

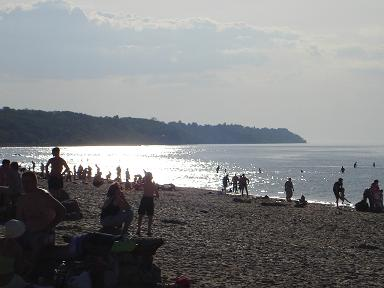
Toila Beach

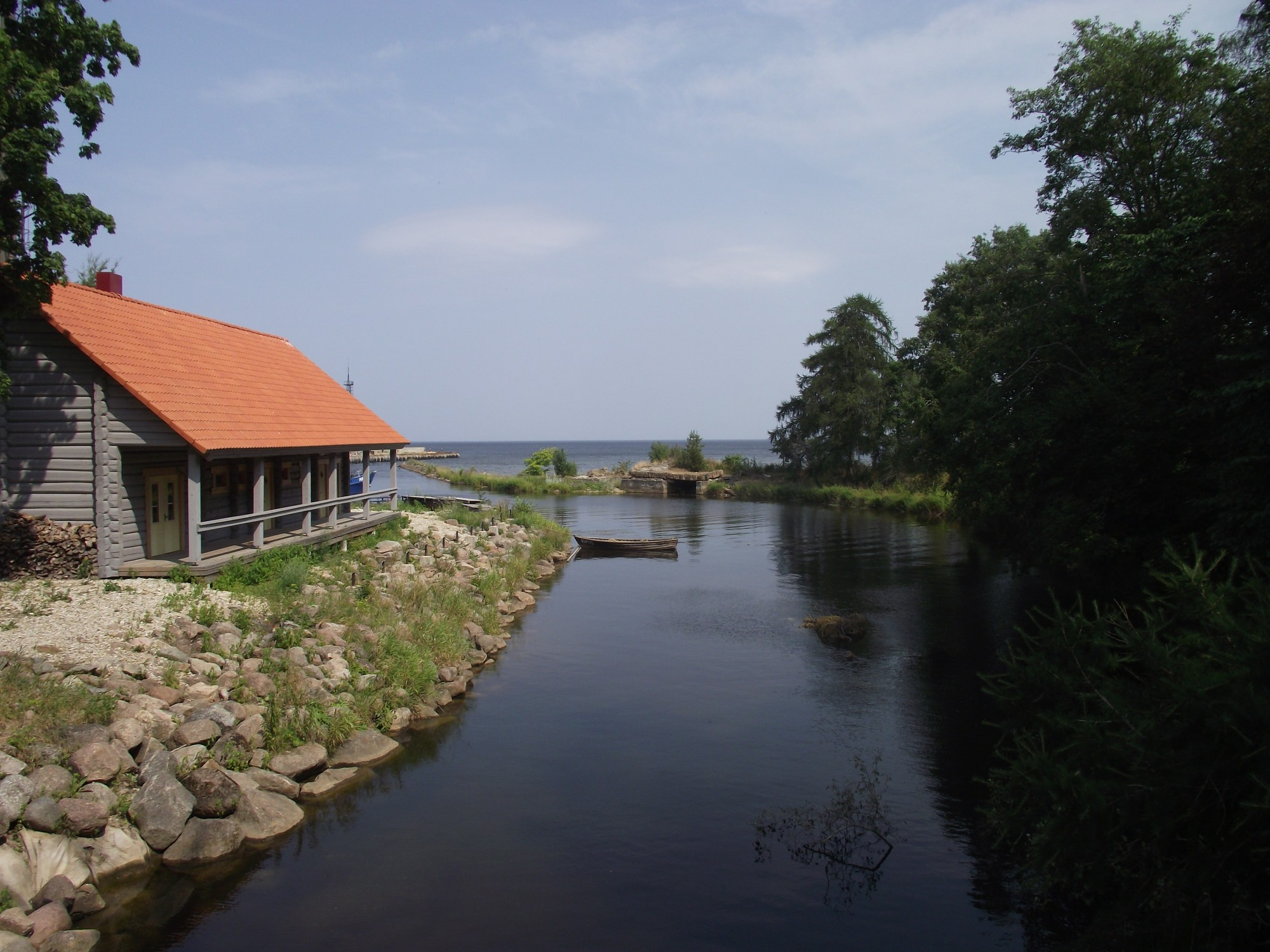
Mouth of the Pühajõgi River in Toila

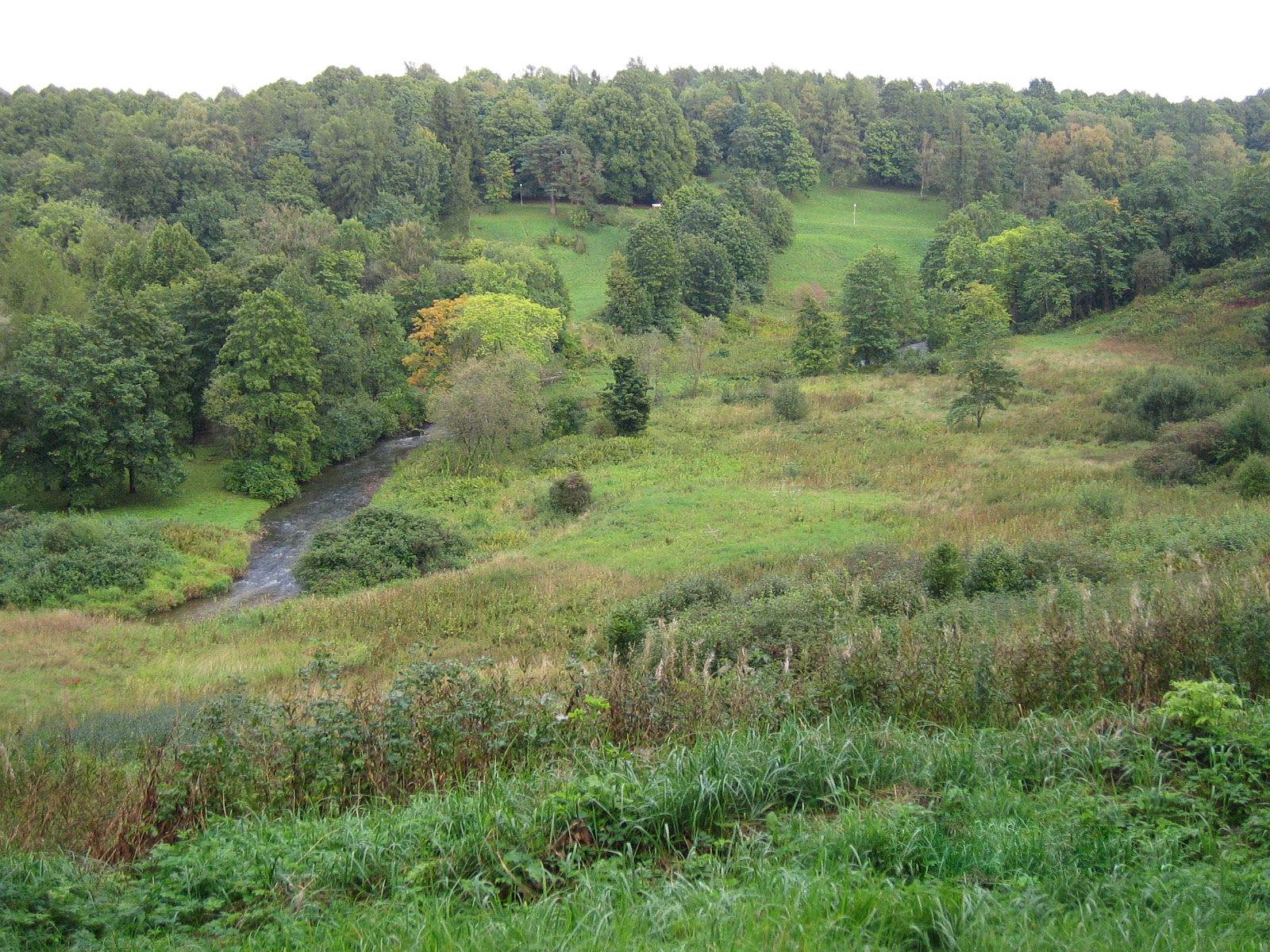
The Pühajõgi River in the park

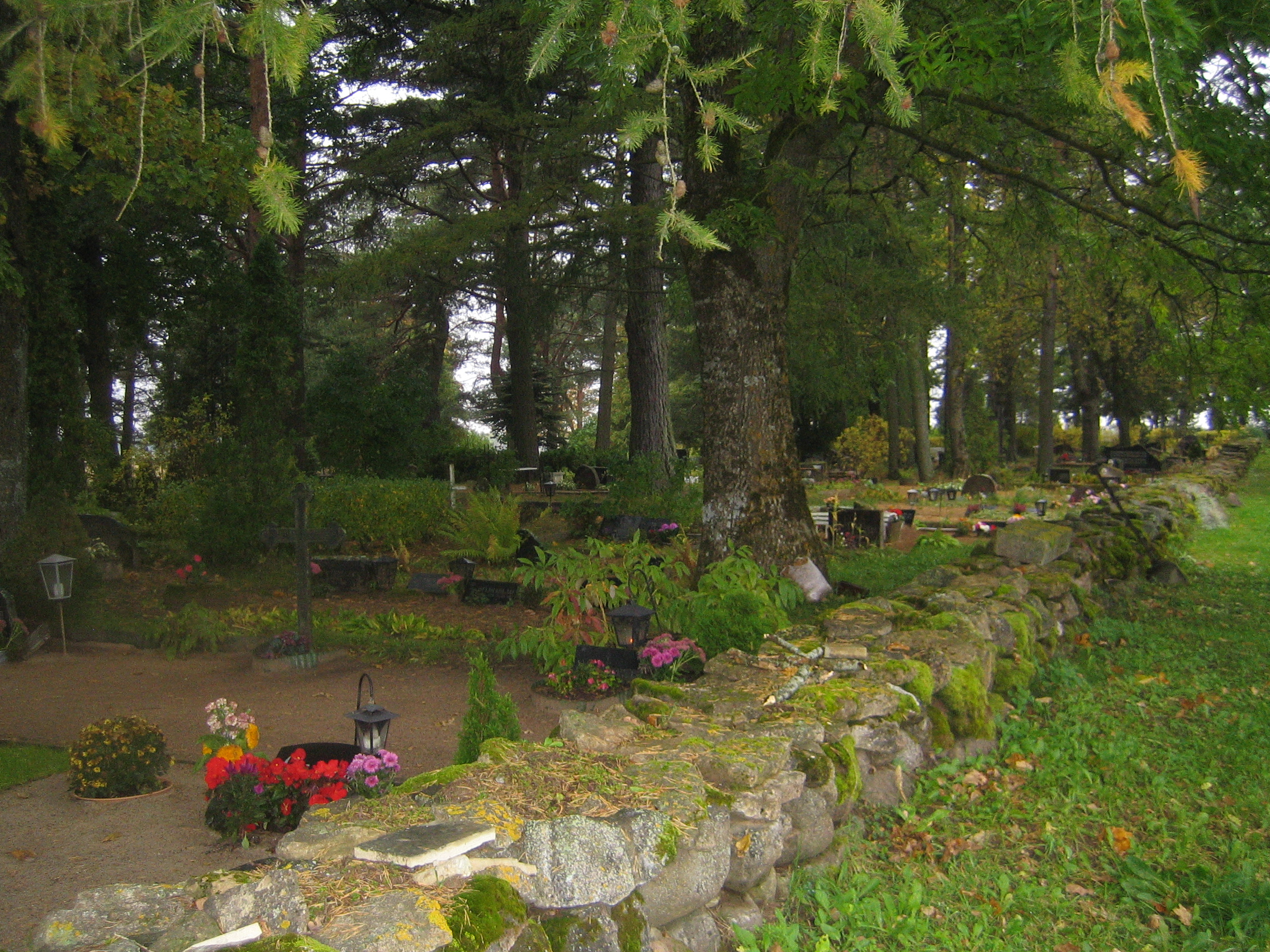
Toila cemetery

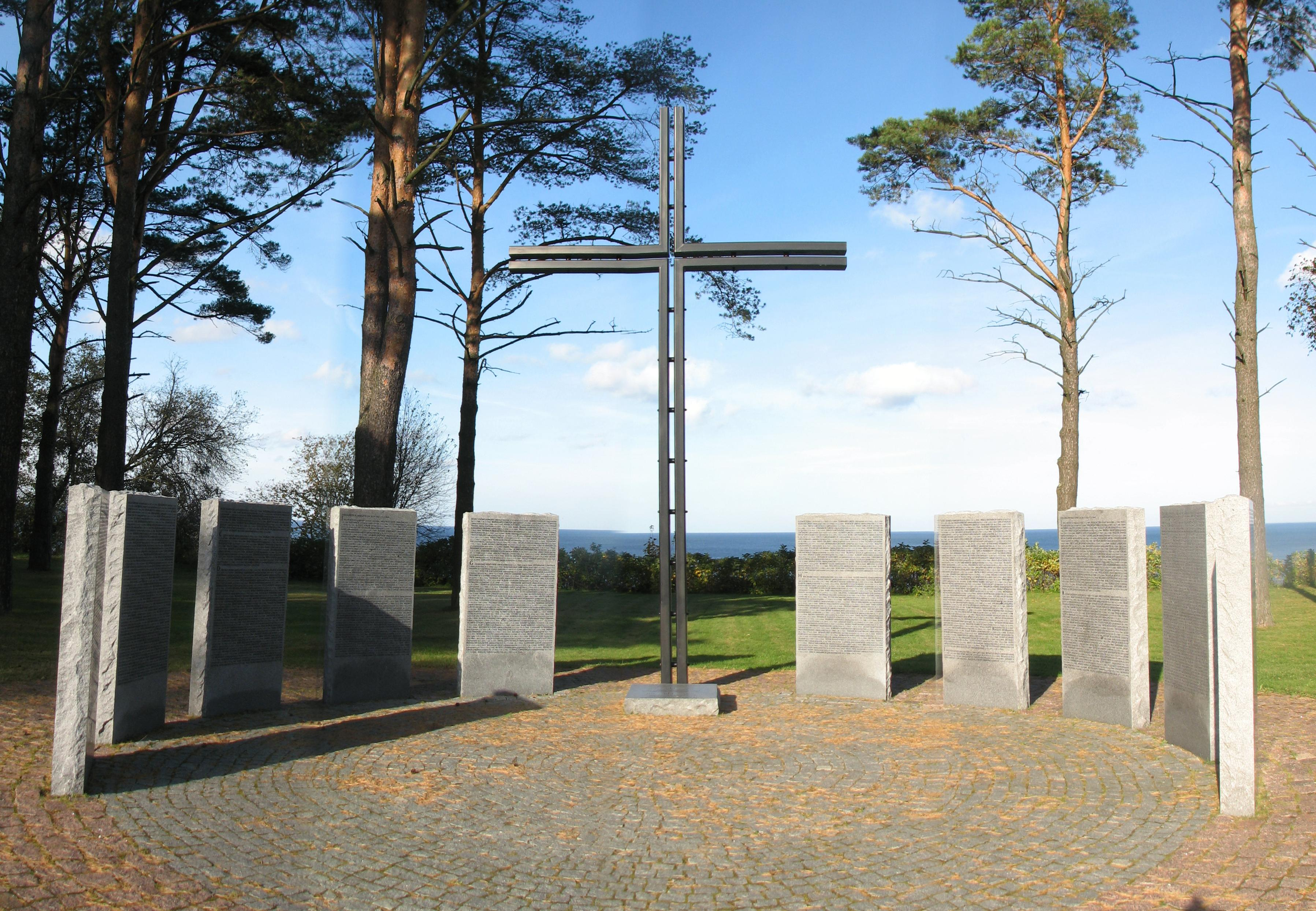
Cemetery of German soldiers

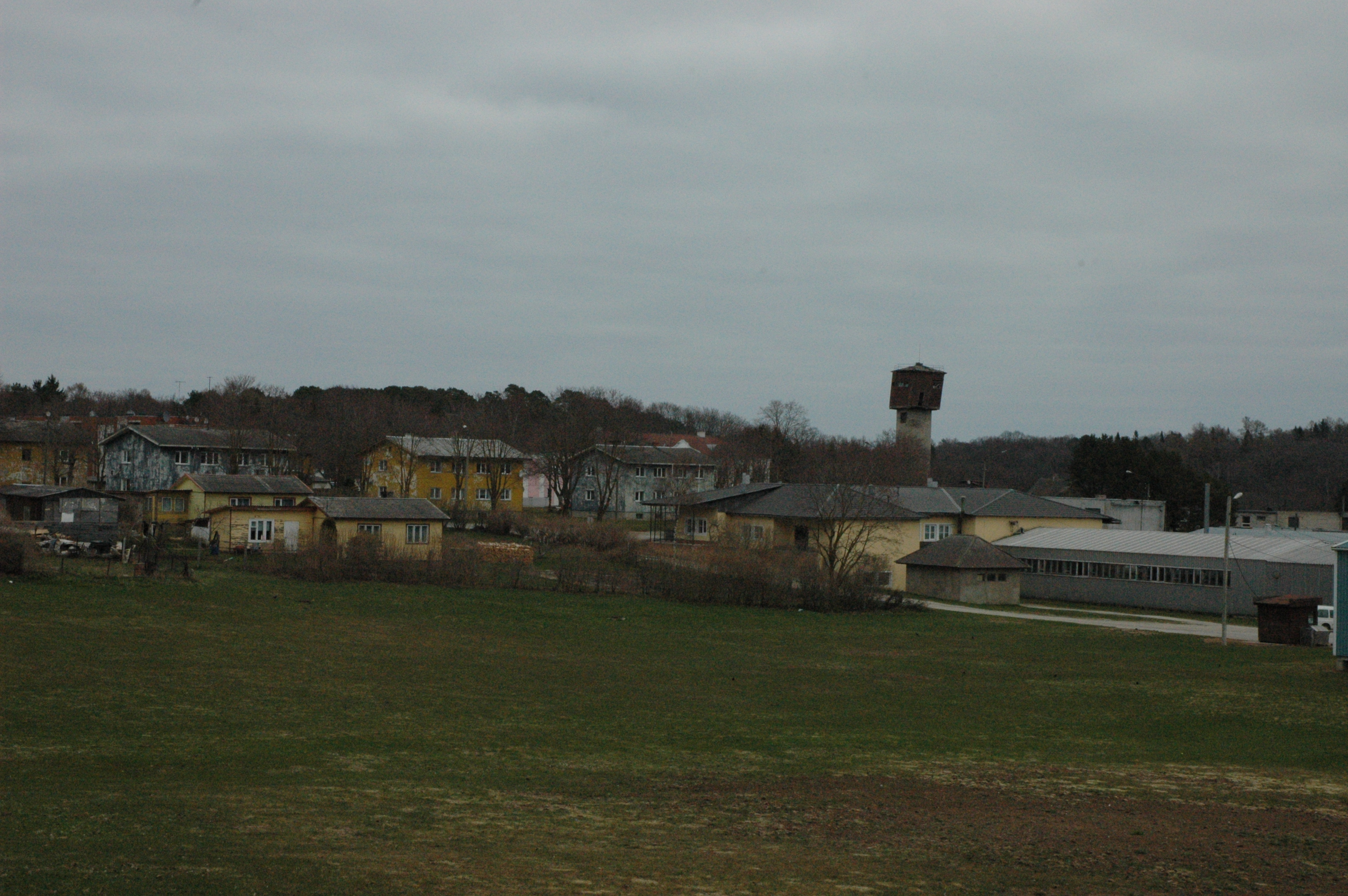
The settlement
