= Oru Palace =

Palace in Estonia

Coordinates: 59°25′22″N 27°31′57″E

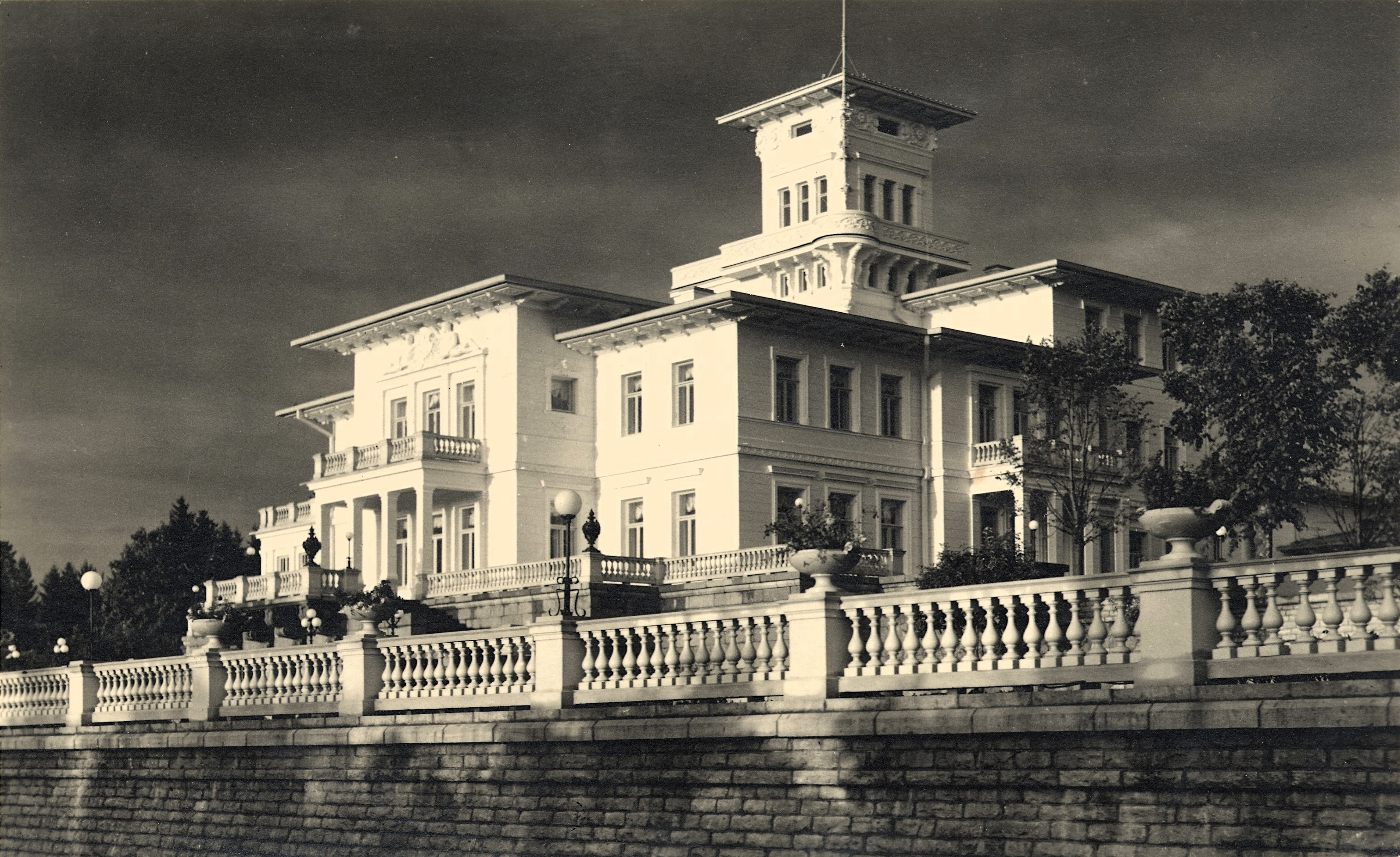
Oru Palace

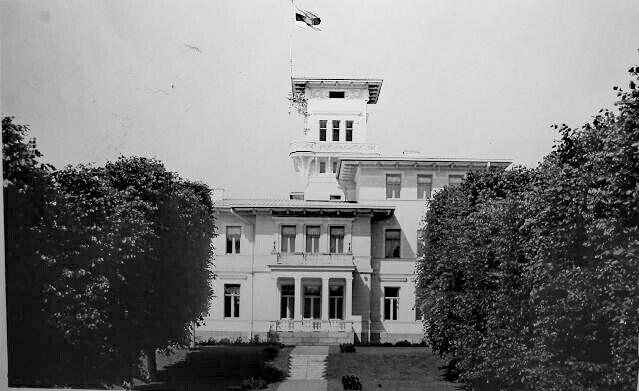
Oru Palace

Oru Palace (Estonian: Oru loss, German: Orrenhof) was a palace in the northeastern part of Toila in the Viru valley of Jõhvi Parish in Ida-Viru County, Estonia.

The palace was originally the holiday home of a Russian merchant, Grigori Eliseev, and later the summer residence of the Estonian head of state. It was built in the Italian Renaissance style by Gavril Baranovski, with park designer Georg Kuphaldt. The 57-room three-story building was completed in 1899. The palace descends towards the river terraces, and also contains riding stables and manege. Alleged construction of the palace and the park was the total cost of five million gold rubles.

After the Bolshevik revolution of October, Jelissejev went to Paris. The land belonging to the palace was not sold as it was farmland. In 1934, Jelissejev was not willing to sell land to private persons, but only in the state. The agreement was finalized on 22 February 1935. Until 1940 it served as the summer residence of the Estonian president Konstantin Päts. On 13 August 1941, a fire caused by the retreating Soviets largely destroyed the palace. Today notable gardens are located here.

== Toila-Oru Park ==
The palace is surrounded by Toila-Oru Park. The park was designed in 1899 by Georg Kuphaldt. Nowadays, the park is protected (Oru Park Landscape Conservation Area).
