= Kudobin Islands =

Group of small islands in the Bering Sea

Native name: Kudobin Islands Archipelago
- Location within Alaska

Geography
- Location: Bering Sea
- Coordinates: 56°01′21″N 160°55′20″W
- Length: 8 km (5 mi)
- Highest elevation: 13 m (43 ft)

Administration
- United States
- State: Alaska
- Borough: Aleutians East

Additional information
- Time zone: AKST (UTC-9)
  - Summer (DST): AKDT (UTC-8)
- ZIP code: 99...
- Area code: 907

The Kudobin Islands are a group of small islands in the Bering Sea, near the coast of Alaska, 13 miles (21 km) west of Port Moller, Bristol Bay Low. The group includes a cluster of other small coastal islands, the Walrus and Kritskoi Islands, forming a geographical whole.

The Kudobin Islands are close to Nelson Lagoon. The largest island is about 13.5 km (8.4 mi) long and 1.6 km (1 mile) wide. The islands are flat, the highest point on theme being 4 m (13 ft).

== Etymology ==
These coastal islands were surveyed by Andrew Khudobin (IRN, one of Captain Fyodor Petrovich Litke's naval officers in 1828. Khudobin named the group Ile aux Loups or Wolf Island, according to Lutke. Lutke (1836, p. 263) called the group Khoudobine. Its present name, Khudobin Island, was given in 1882 by W. H. Dall, USC&GS.
