= Oru Park Landscape Conservation Area =

Nature park in Estonia

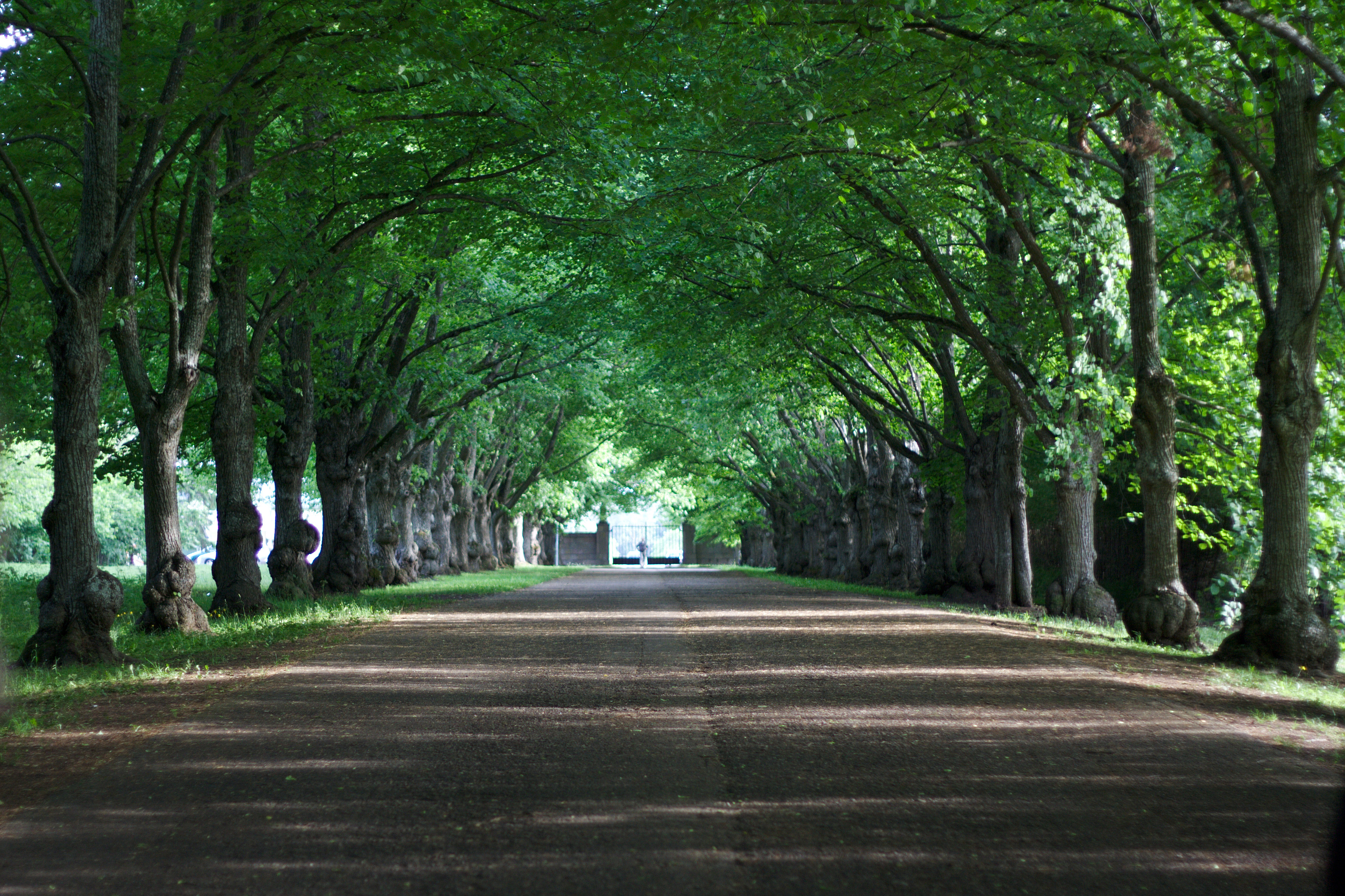

- Location within Estonia
- Location: Estonia
- Coordinates: 59°25′22″N 27°31′48″E
- Area: 75 hectares (190 acres)
- Established: 1957 (1997)

Oru Park Landscape Conservation Area is a nature park which is located in Ida-Viru County, Estonia.

The area of the nature park is 75 hectares (190 acres).

The protected area was founded in 1957 to protect Toila-Oru Park (a part of Saka-Ontika-Toila Limestone Shore). In 1997, the protected area was designated to the landscape conservation area.
