= Simuna, Estonia =

Borough in Estonia

Simuna
- Small borough
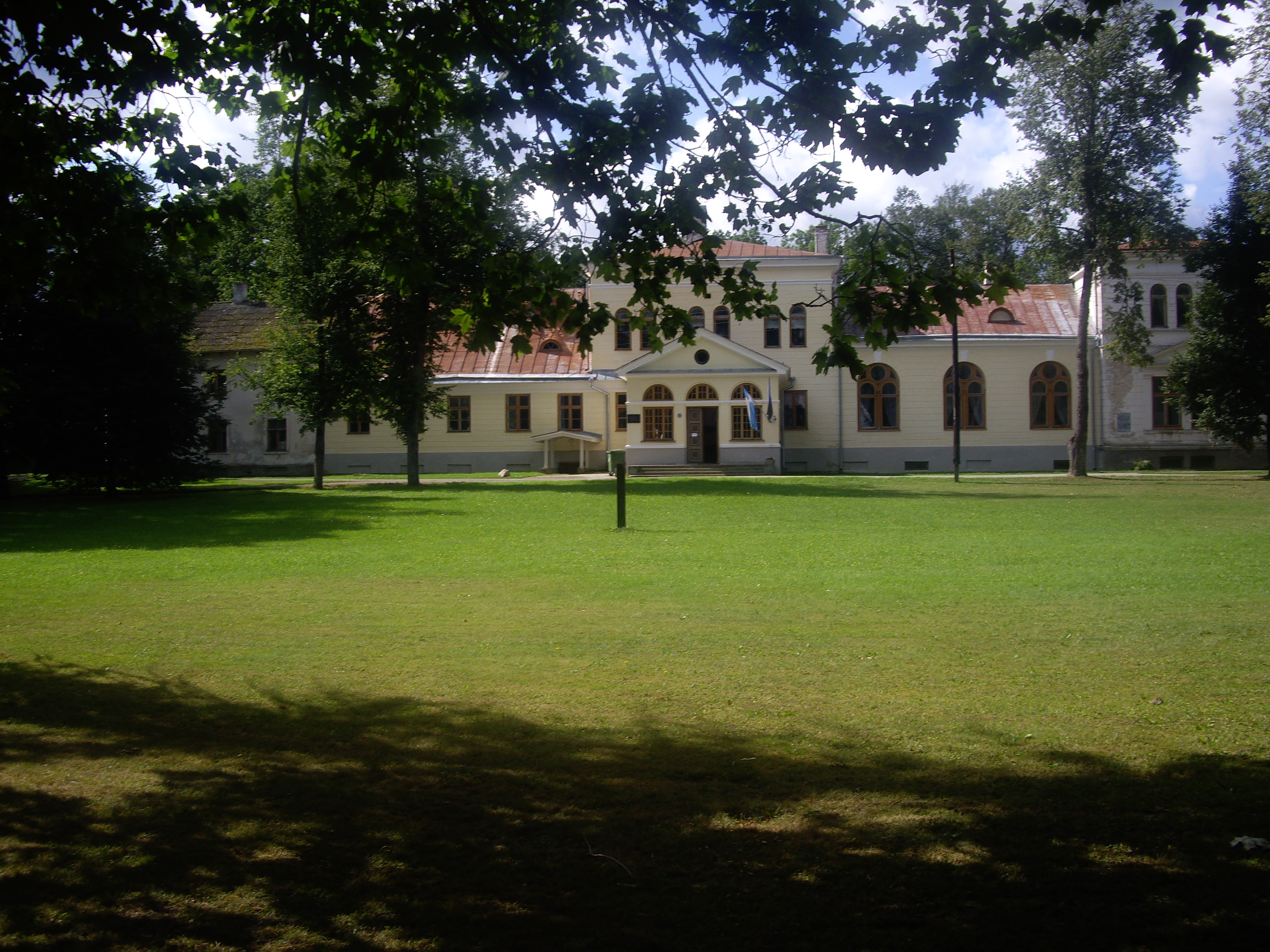
- Avanduse Manor in Simuna

- Location in Estonia
- Coordinates: 59°02′52″N 26°24′09″E
- Country: Estonia
- County: Lääne-Viru County
- Municipality: Väike-Maarja Parish

Population (01.08.2019)
  - Total: 422

Simuna (German: St. Simonis) is a small borough in Väike-Maarja Parish, Lääne-Viru County, in northeastern Estonia. It had a population of 454 as of 2011.

Before 2005 Simuna was the seat of Avanduse Parish, which was merged with Väike-Maarja Parish.

One of the points of the Struve Geodetic Arc is located in Simuna.

== Name ==
Simuna is named after the church in the settlement, which is dedicated to Saints Simon and Jude. A hamlet with the name Simuna was established near the church in the 19th century on land that belonged to the village of Katkuküla (now named Avanduse). The name Avanduse originally referred to Avanduse Manor in Simuna.

== Avanduse Manor ==
Avanduse Manor (German: Awandus) is located in Simuna. It was first mentioned in written records in 1494. The present-day manor building was erected in 1679–1684 by the master builder Gerd Vorberg from Reval (Tallinn), who had been commissioned by the owner of the Avanduse estate, Gideon von Fock. The building has been significantly rebuilt since then; the most recent changes were made by the architect Rudolf von Engelhardt in 1890.

The admiral and geographer Friedrich von Lütke (1797–1882) was one of the best-known owners of the estate, and there is a plaque dedicated to him on the manor building's wall.

== Notable natives and residents ==
- Friedrich von Lütke (Fyodor Litke) (1797–1882), admiral, geographer, and explorer
- Carl Julius Albert Paucker (1798–1856), historian and jurist
- Magnus Georg Paucker (1787–1855), astronomer
- Netty Pinna (1883–1937), actress
- Leo Sepp (1892–1941), politician
- Vladimir Yadov (1929–2015), sociologist

== Gallery ==
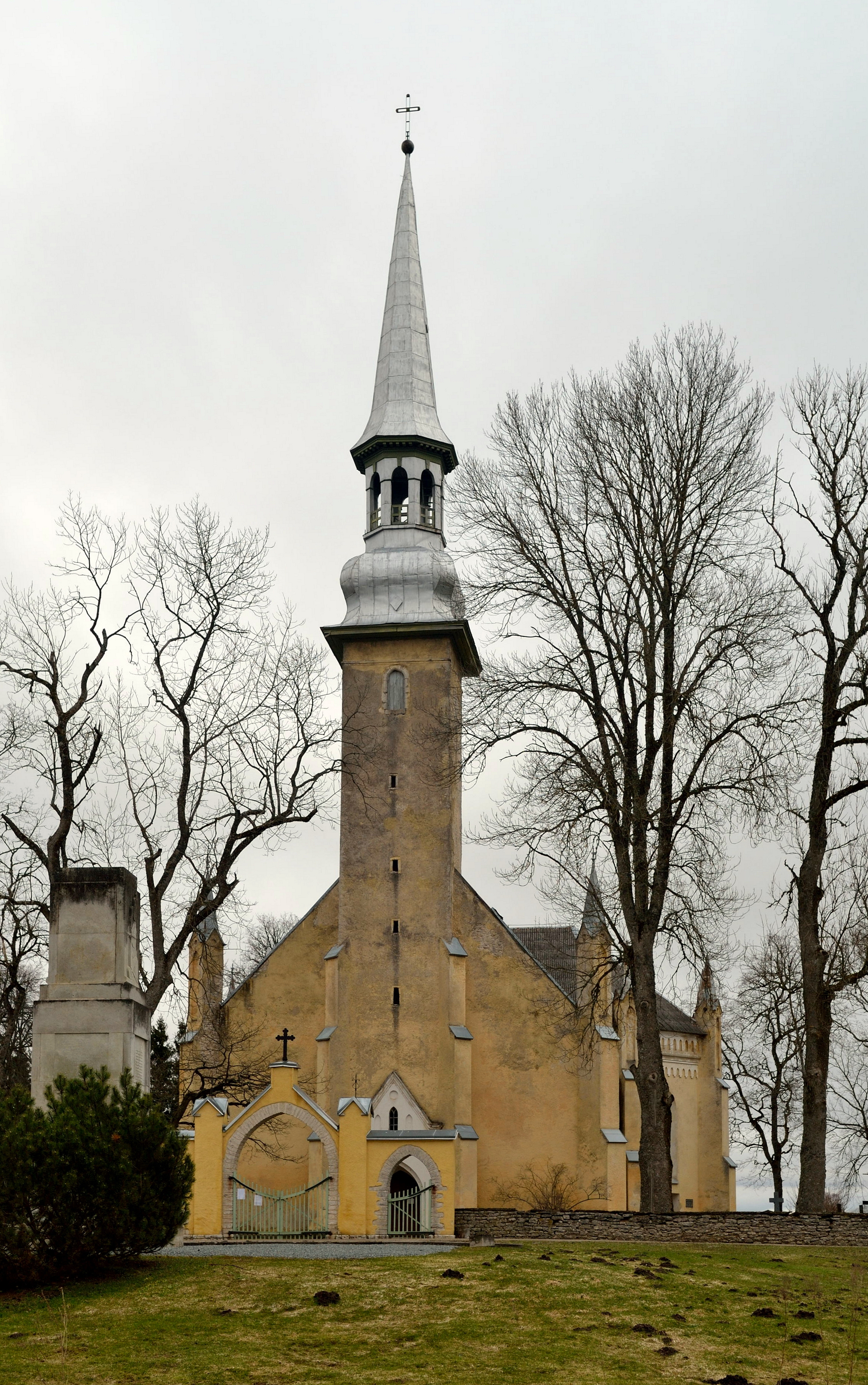
Simuna Church

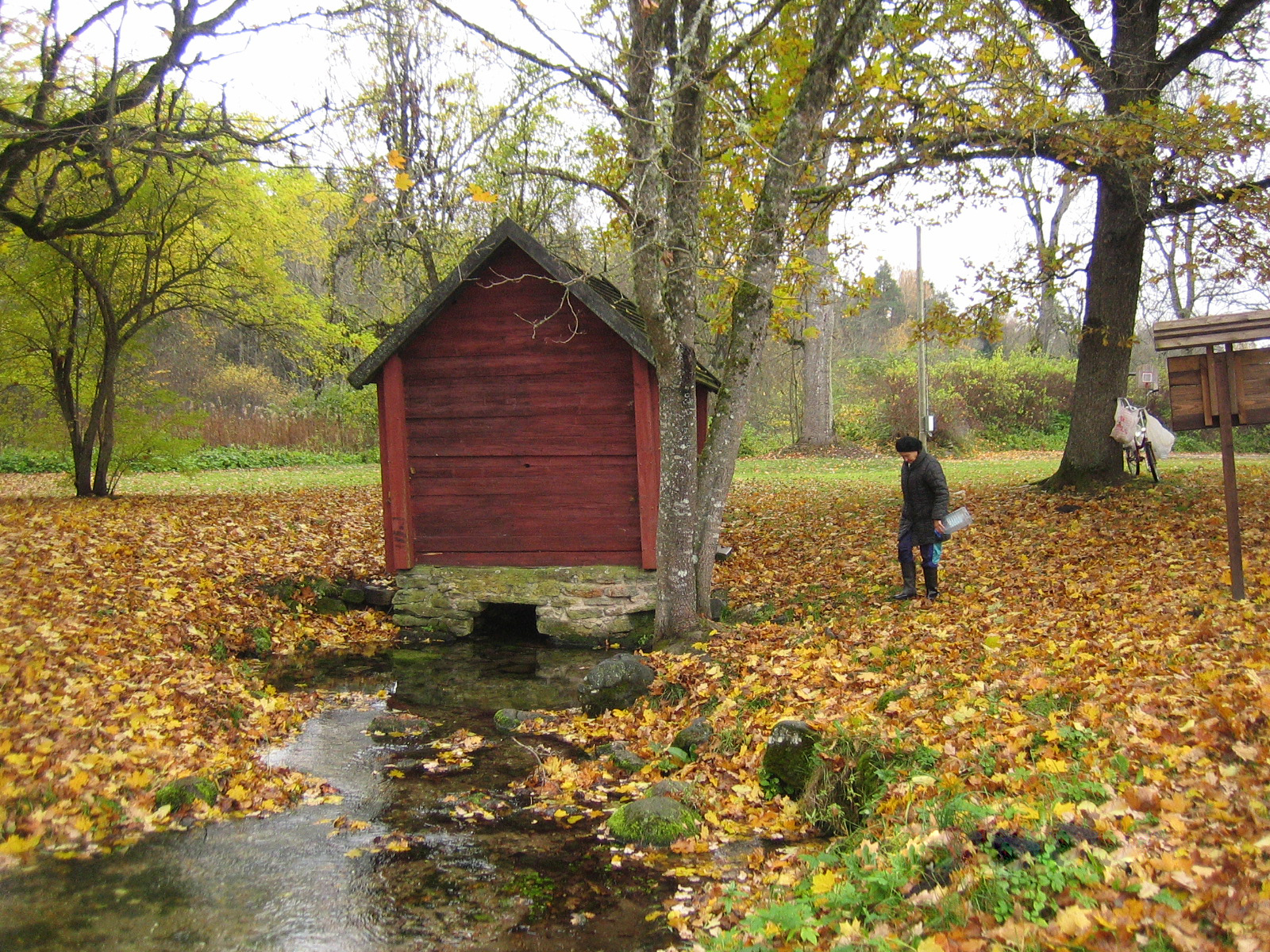
A spring in Simuna

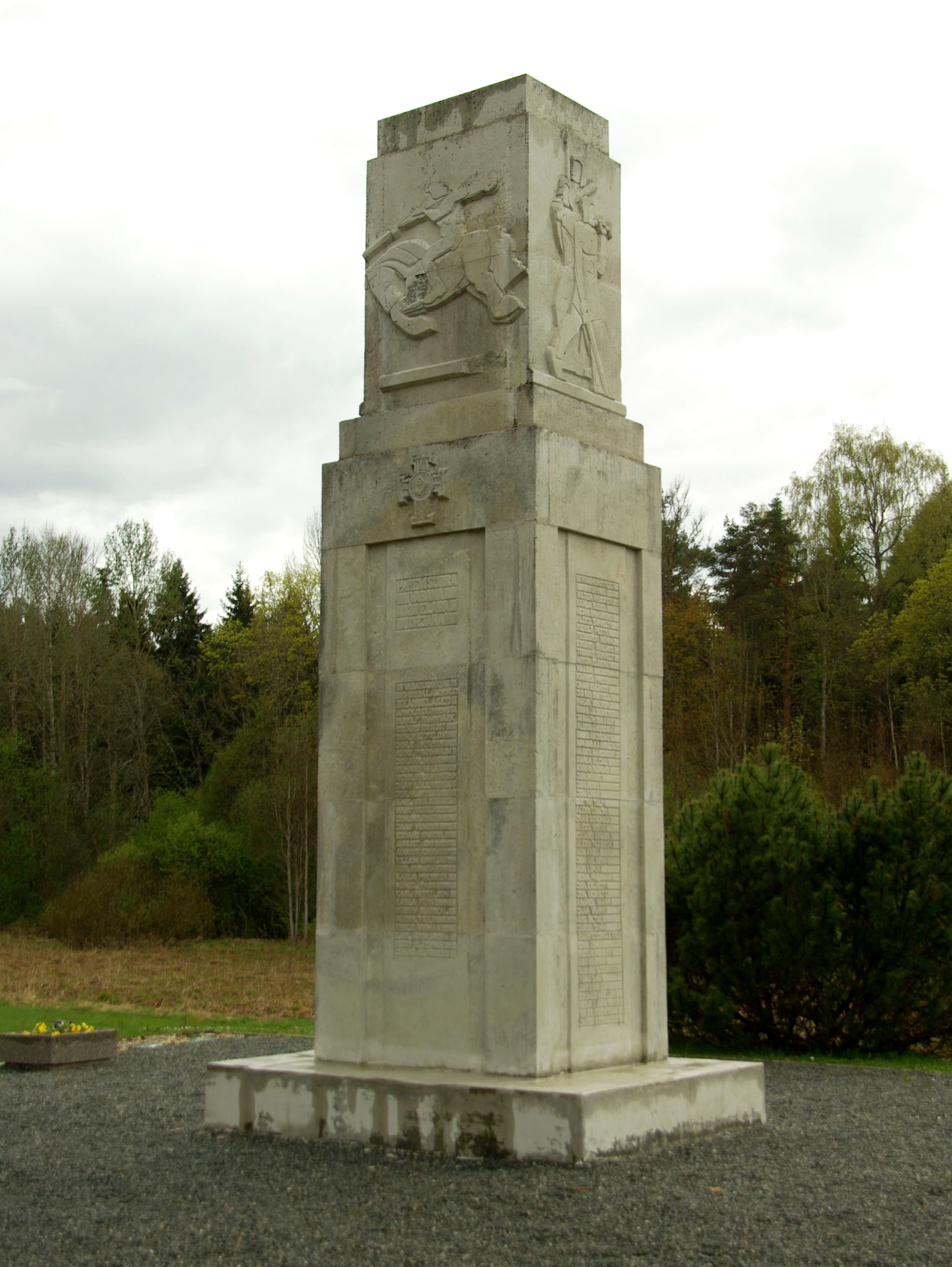
Monument to the Estonian War of Independence

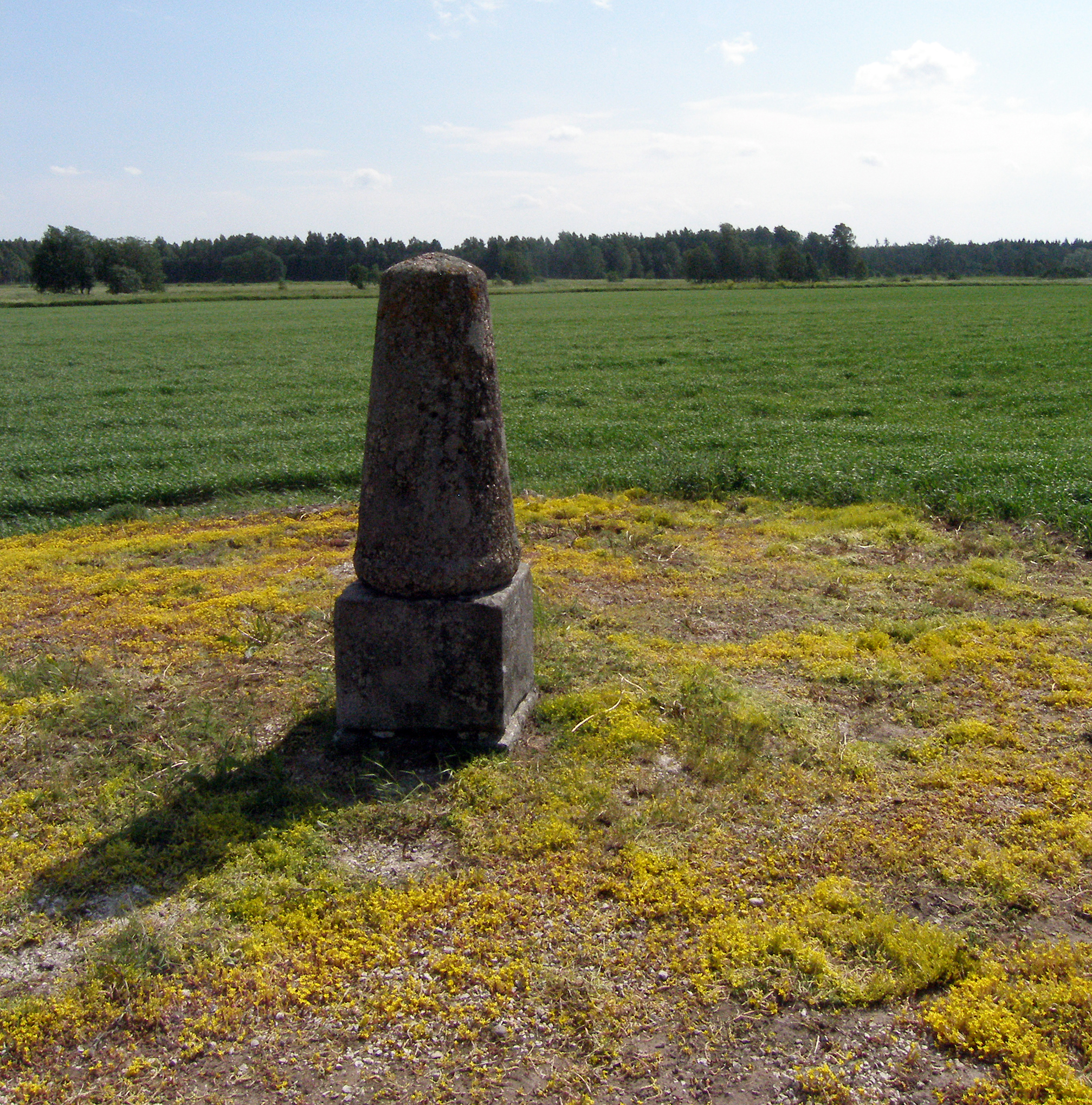
A triangulation stone of the Struve Geodetic Arc near Simuna

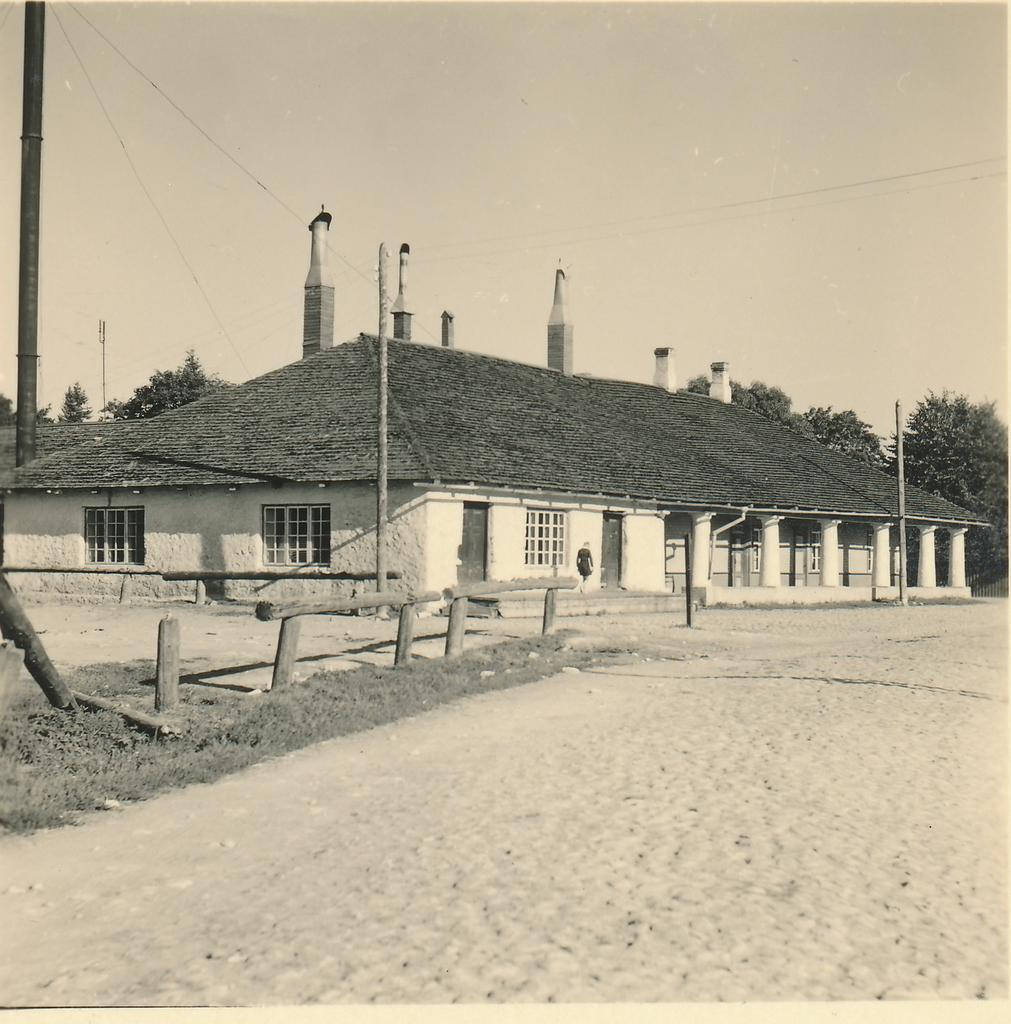
The Simuna inn (early 20th century)

== See also ==
- List of palaces and manor houses in Estonia
