= Saint Lawrence Bay, Chukotka =

Bay in Bering Sea, Russia

Saint Lawrence Bay
- Залив Лаврентия (Russian)
- Location of the bay in Chukotka

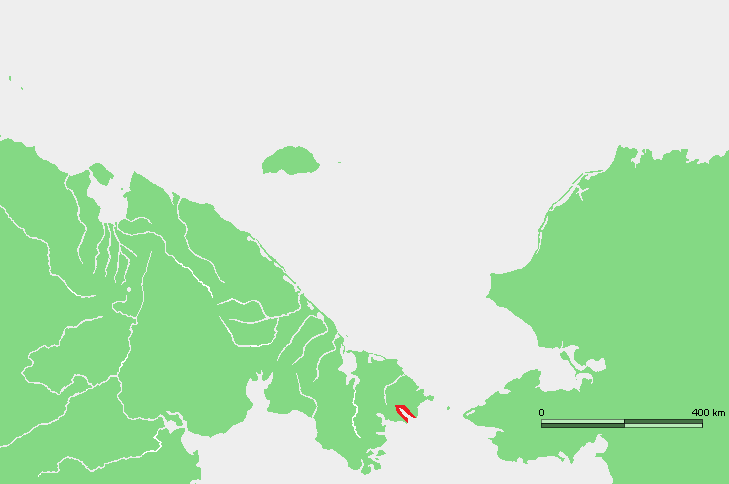
- Location: Far North
- Coordinates: 65.6667°N 171.0833°W
- Ocean/sea sources: Bering Sea
- Basin countries: Russia
- Max. length: 45 km (28 mi)
- Max. width: 8 km (5.0 mi)
- Settlements: Port Lawrence

The Saint Lawrence Bay (Russian: Залив Лаврентия; Zaliv Lavrentiya) is a bay in the Bering Sea on the eastern coast of the Chukotka Peninsula, Russian Federation.

== Geography ==
This bay is located very close to the Bering Strait, which lies only a few km to the NE.

The bay is open towards the southeast; it is 45 km in length and has an average width of about 8 km. There are two little islands inside the bay where it narrows forming an inlet. On the southern shore of the bay at Cape Hargilah is the village of Lavrentiya.

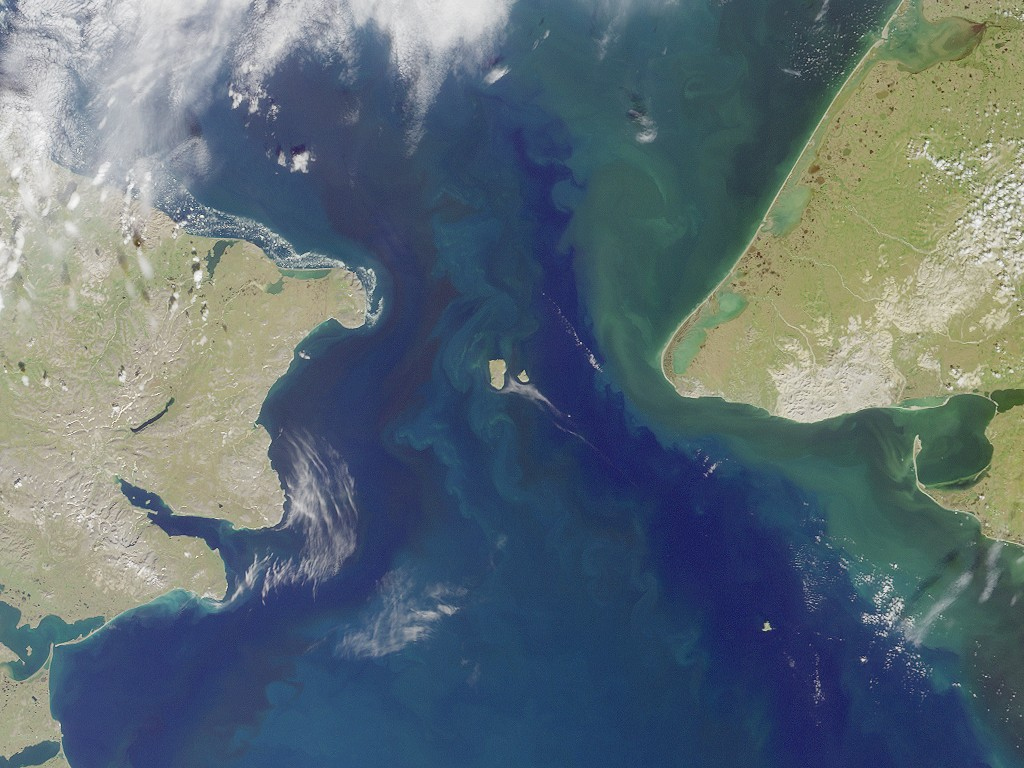
NASA picture of the Bering Strait area; St. Lawrence Bay can be clearly seen on the lower left side of the image.

== History ==
British Captain James Cook landed for a few hours in St. Lawrence Bay and met some of the local Chukchi people in August 1778, but he didn't linger in the bay.

This bay was first surveyed by Russian mariner Count Fyodor Petrovich Litke in 1828.

== See also ==
- Lavrentiya
- USS Rodgers (1879)
