= Pühajõgi =

River in Estonia

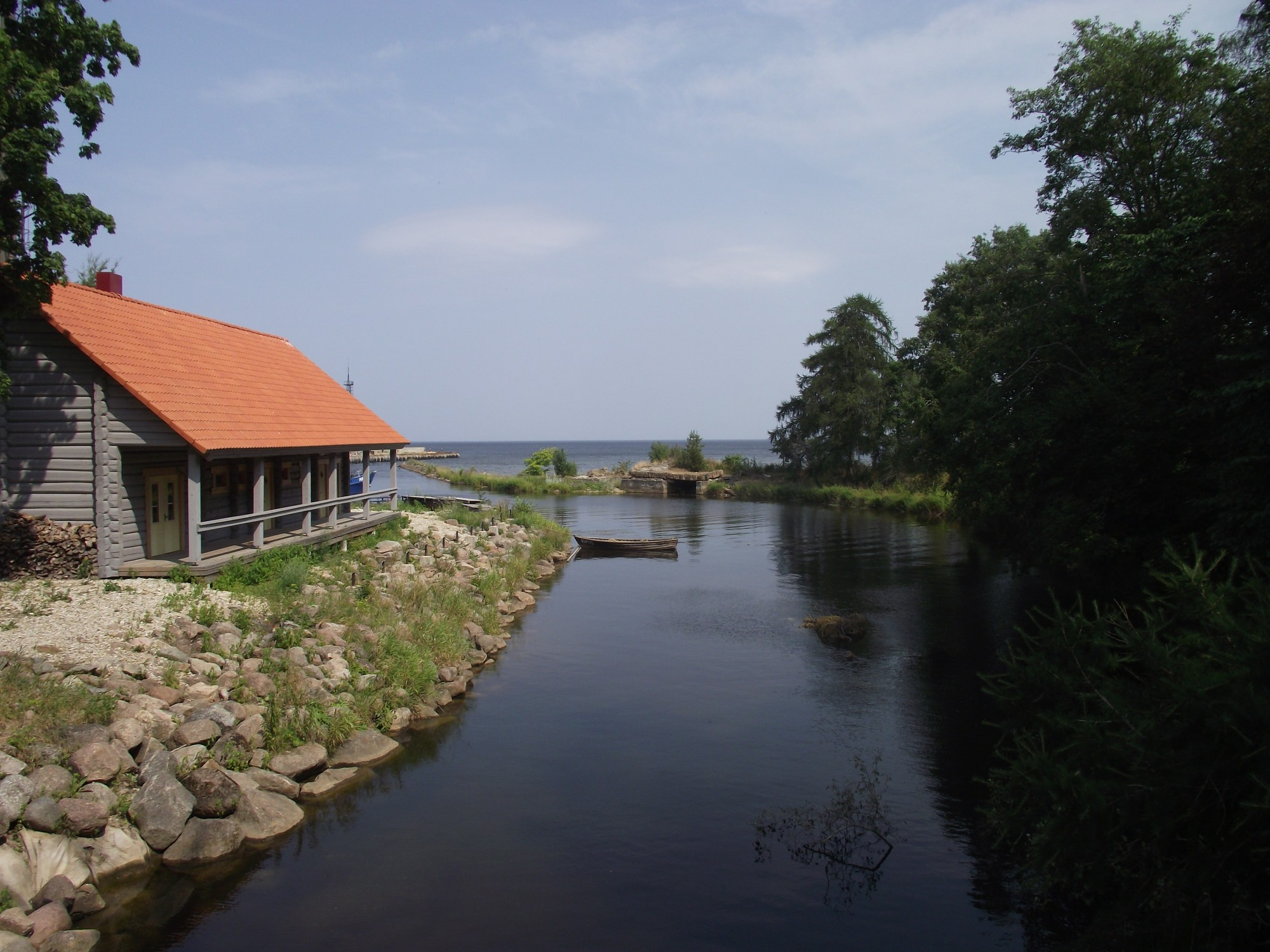

Location
- Country: Estonia

Physical characteristics
- Mouth: Gulf of Finland
  - location: Toila
  - coordinates: 59°25′39″N 27°32′04″E
- Length: 36.5 km (22.7 mi)
- Basin size: 219.7 km^{2} (84.8 sq mi)

The Pühajõgi is a river in Ida-Viru County, Estonia. The river is 36.5 km long, and its basin size is 219.7 km^{2}. It discharges into the Gulf of Finland.

Trout and grayling live in the river.

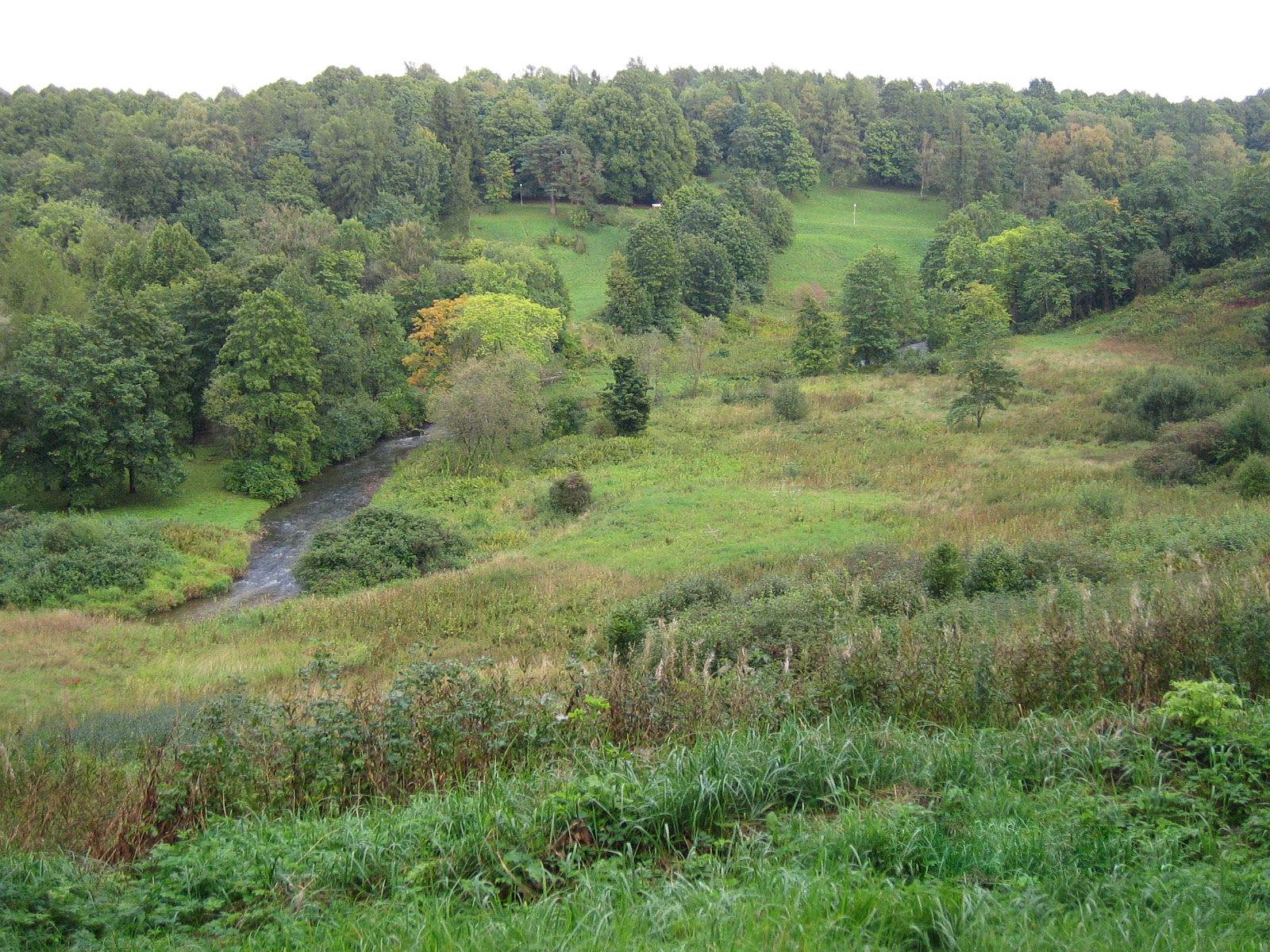
The Pühajõgi Valley in Toila
