= Cape Lutke (Alaska) =

Headland in Alaska, United States

Coordinates: 54°29′02″N 164°20′59″W

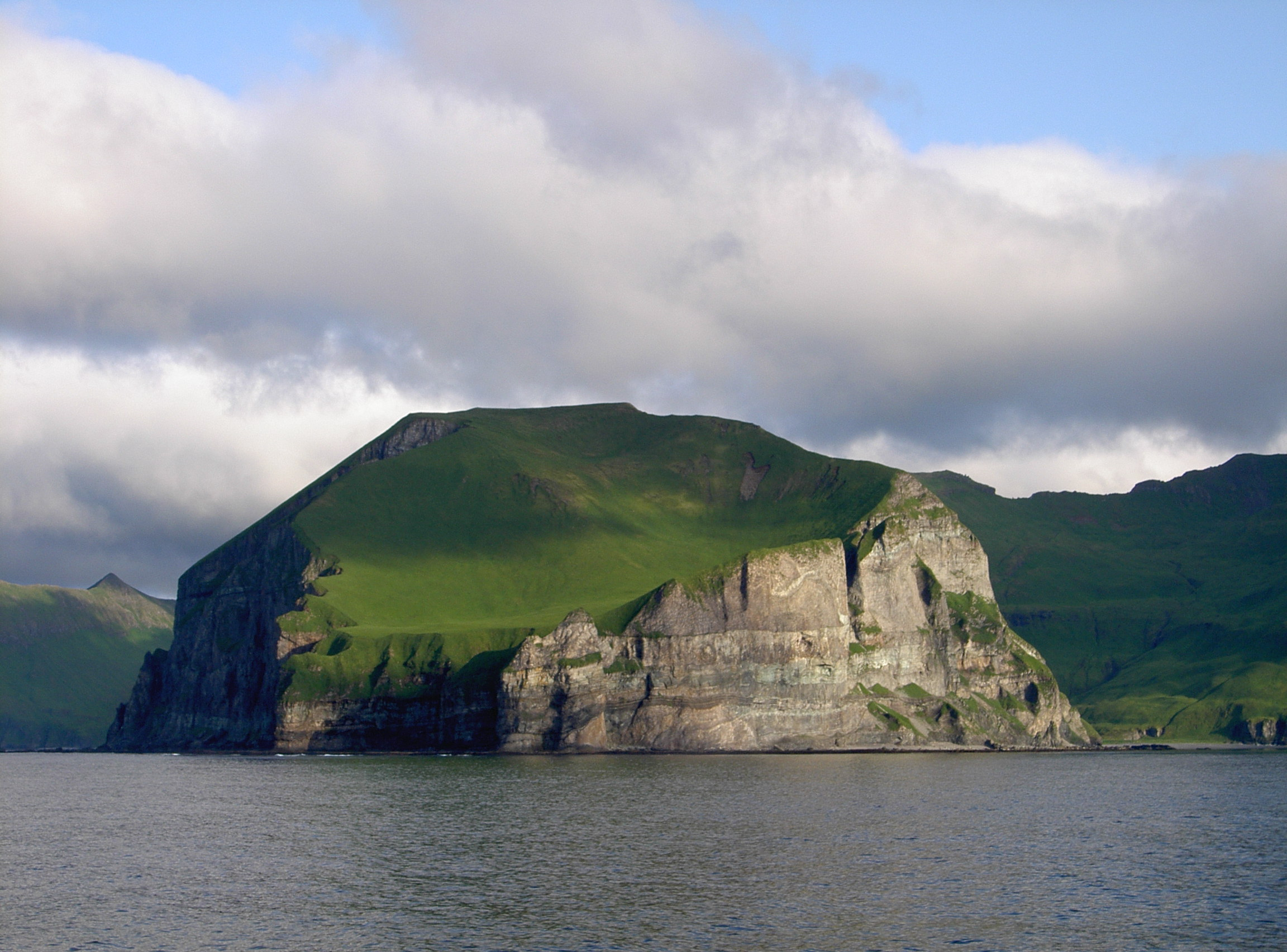
Cape Lutkes headland

Cape Lutke is a headland on Unimak Island, the largest island in the Aleutian Islands chain of the U.S. state of Alaska. It is located on the southern central coast of the island.

This headland was named Mys Litke, after Russian explorer Count Fyodor Petrovich Litke, by the Imperial Russian Hydrographic Service in 1847. "Litke" is the Russian form of the German "Lütke", which is Anglicized as "Lutke".

This same point was called Mys Sivuchiy (meaning "Sealion Cape" in Russian) by Capt. Tebenkov in 1852, and Cape Promontory by the U.S. Bureau of Fisheries (USBF) in 1888.
