= Netty Pinna =

Estonian actress

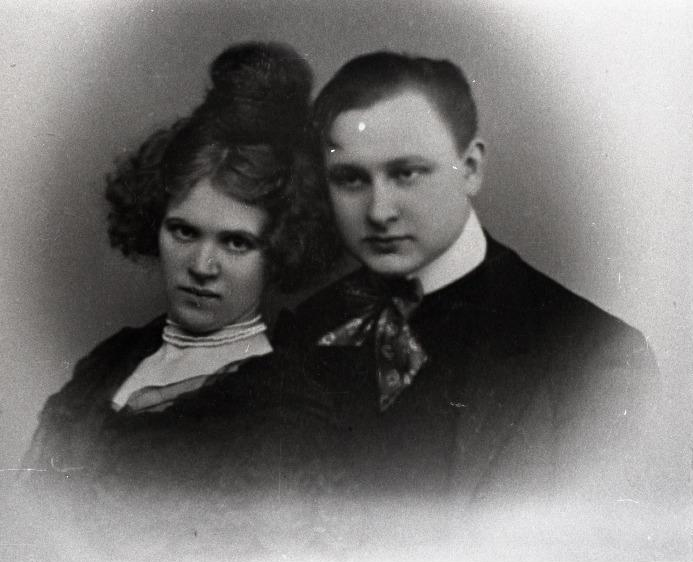
Netty and Paul Pinna in 1908

Anette-Elise "Netty" Pinna (28 June 1883 – 28 April 1937; born Anette-Elise Adler) was an Estonian actress born in Simuna, Avanduse Parish.

Her father was J. Adler, a blacksmith. She studied at the Tallinn girls' school from 1893 to 1898. She had some stage experience in an amateur theatre group before the establishment of professional theater in Estonia. In 1903, she started her stage activity at the Estonia Theatre, and in 1908, she studied in Berlin in Emanuel Reicher's theatre courses. From 1906 to 1936 (with interruptions), she also worked at the Estonia Theatre.

During this time period, actresses tended to by typecast as either tall, strong "heroines" or sentimental or youthful "naives". Pinna was noted for being able to play either with complexity.

She married the actor and stage director Paul Pinna in 1908 and they had two children, a daughter the actress Signe (b. 1909) and son Paul (b. 1913). She died in Tallinn in 1937

== Theatre roles (selected) ==
Year	Title	Role	Notes	Ref
1903	Gorky's Põhjas	Anna		
1906	Chekhov's Juubel	Tatjana	Estonia Theatre	
1906	Metsanurk's Päikese tõusul	Marta Adson	Estonia Theatre	
1906	Hauptmann's Elga	Elga		
1910	Othello	Desdemona		
1917	Heijerman's Lootus õnnistusele	Jo		
1921	Tammsaare's Juudit	Juudit	Estonian Drama Theatre	

== Awards ==
- 1936: Merited Actor
