= Magnus Georg Paucker =

Baltic German mathematician (1787–1855)

Magnus Georg von Paucker
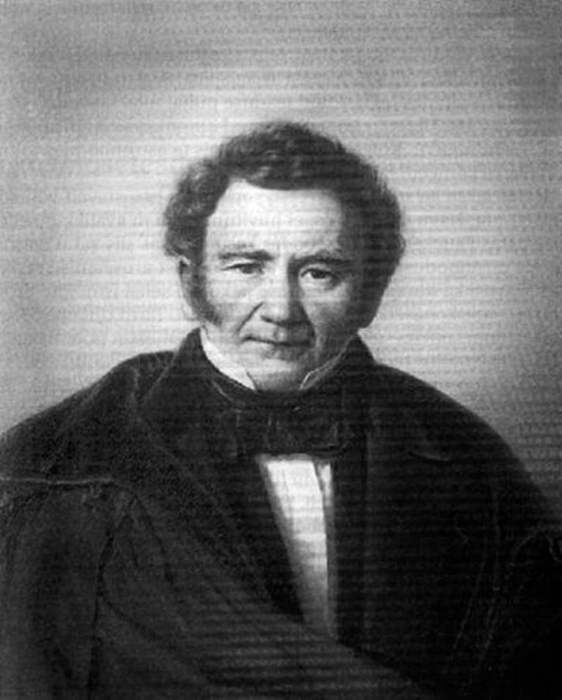
- Born: 26 November [O.S. 15 November] 1787; Sankt Simonis, Russian Empire
- Died: 31 August [O.S. 19 August] 1855; Mitau, Russian Empire
- Education: Imperial University of Dorpat
- Known for: Handbuch der Metrologie Rußlands und seiner deutschen Provinzen
- Awards: Demidov Prize (1832)
- Scientific career
- Workplaces: Mitau Gymnasium

Magnus Georg von Paucker (Russian: Магнус-Георг Андреевич Паукер, romanized: Magnus-Georg Andreevič Pauker; 26 November [O.S. 15 November] 1787 – 31 August [O.S. 19 August] 1855) was a Baltic German astronomer and mathematician and the first Demidov Prize winner in 1832 for his work Handbuch der Metrologie Rußlands und seiner deutschen Provinzen.

== Biography ==
Paucker was born in the small Estonian village of Sankt Simonis (now Simuna). In 1805, he began his studies in astronomy and physics at the University of Dorpat, where his professors included Georg Friedrich Parrot and Johann Wilhelm Andreas Pfaff. Between 1808 and 1809, Paucker took part in the surveying of the Emajõgi river which was the first geodetic expedition on the territory of Estonia. In 1809 he contributed to the construction of the first optical telegraph line in Russia from Saint Petersburg to Tsarskoye Selo.

In 1811 Paucker took over as a lecturer at the University of Dorpat, succeeding Ernst Friedrich Knorre. In 1813 he was awarded his Ph.D. for a thesis in solid physics titled De nova explicatione phaenomeni elasticitatis corporum rigidorum.

Paucker left Dorpat (now Simuna) in 1813 and stayed the rest of his life in Mitau (now Jelgava) where he was a professor of mathematics at the Mitau Gymnasium and an organizer of the first scientific society in Latvia, the Courland Society of Literature and Art.

== Sources ==
- "Паукер, Магнус Георг" . Brockhaus and Efron Encyclopedic Dictionary (in Russian). 1906.
