= Walrus and Kritskoi Islands =

Islands in Bering sea, close to Alaska coast

- Location of Walrus Island in Alaska

Geography
- Coordinates: 56°1′42″N 160°49′59″W
- Length: 22 mi (35 km)

Administration
- United States
- State: Alaska
- Borough: Aleutians East

Additional information
- Time zone: AKST (UTC-9)
  - Summer (DST): AKDT (UTC-8)
- ZIP code: 99...
- Area code: +1 907

The Walrus and Kritskoi Islands are a group of small islands in the Bering Sea, close to the coast of Alaska. The group is part of a cluster of other small coastal islands called the Kudobin Islands.

The Walrus and Kritskoi Islands are located close to Nelson Lagoon, 9 miles (14 km) to the West of Port Moller, on the Alaska Peninsula (southern) side of Bristol Bay, Low.

== Walrus Island ==
The largest island is Walrus, being about 23.5 km long and 3 km wide. The islands are flat, the highest point on Walrus Island being only 1 m.

=== Etymology ===
These coastal islands were renamed in 1882 by W. H. Dall, USC&GS. Russian Captain Litke (1836) had named Walrus Island as "Volchie," meaning "wolf," in 1836. This name is now applied to the eastern tip of this feature.

== Kritskoi Island ==
Kritskoi
- Location of Kritskoi Island in Alaska

Geography
- Coordinates: 56°1′19″N 160°59′16″W
- Highest elevation: 13 ft (4 m)

Administration
- United States
- State: Alaska
- Borough: Aleutians East

Additional information
- Time zone: AKST (UTC-9)
  - Summer (DST): AKDT (UTC-8)
- ZIP code: 99...
- Area code: +1 907

One of Kudobin Islands, 16 miles (26 km) West of village of Port Moller, Alaska, Bristol Bay Low.

Kritskoi Island is only 3.3 km long, but with a height of 4 m it is noticeably higher than Walrus.

=== Etymology ===
Kritskoi Island was named "Kritskoi ile" by Capt. Lutke (1836, p. 261), IRN. He erroneously called it "L'ile aux Loups," or "wolf island," on his Chart 14.

== See also ==
- List of islands of Alaska
