= Avanduse Parish =

Former municipality of Estonia

Avanduse Parish Avanduse vald
- Former municipality
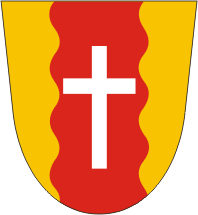
- Flag Coat of arms
- Interactive map of Avanduse Parish
- Coordinates: 59.05°N 26.42°E
- Country: Estonia
- Administrative centre: Simuna

Avanduse Parish (Estonian: Avanduse vald) was a rural municipality of Estonia, in Lääne-Viru County that existed until 1950. The parish was re-established in 1992, and liquidated in 2005 because it was merged with Väike-Maarja Parish.
