= Friedrich Benjamin von Lütke =

Russian admiral (1797–1882)

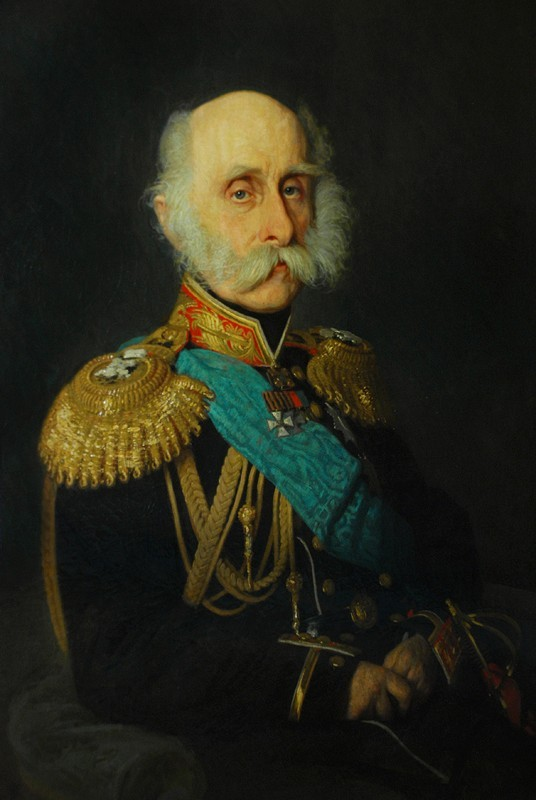
Portrait by Ivan Kramskoi, 1871

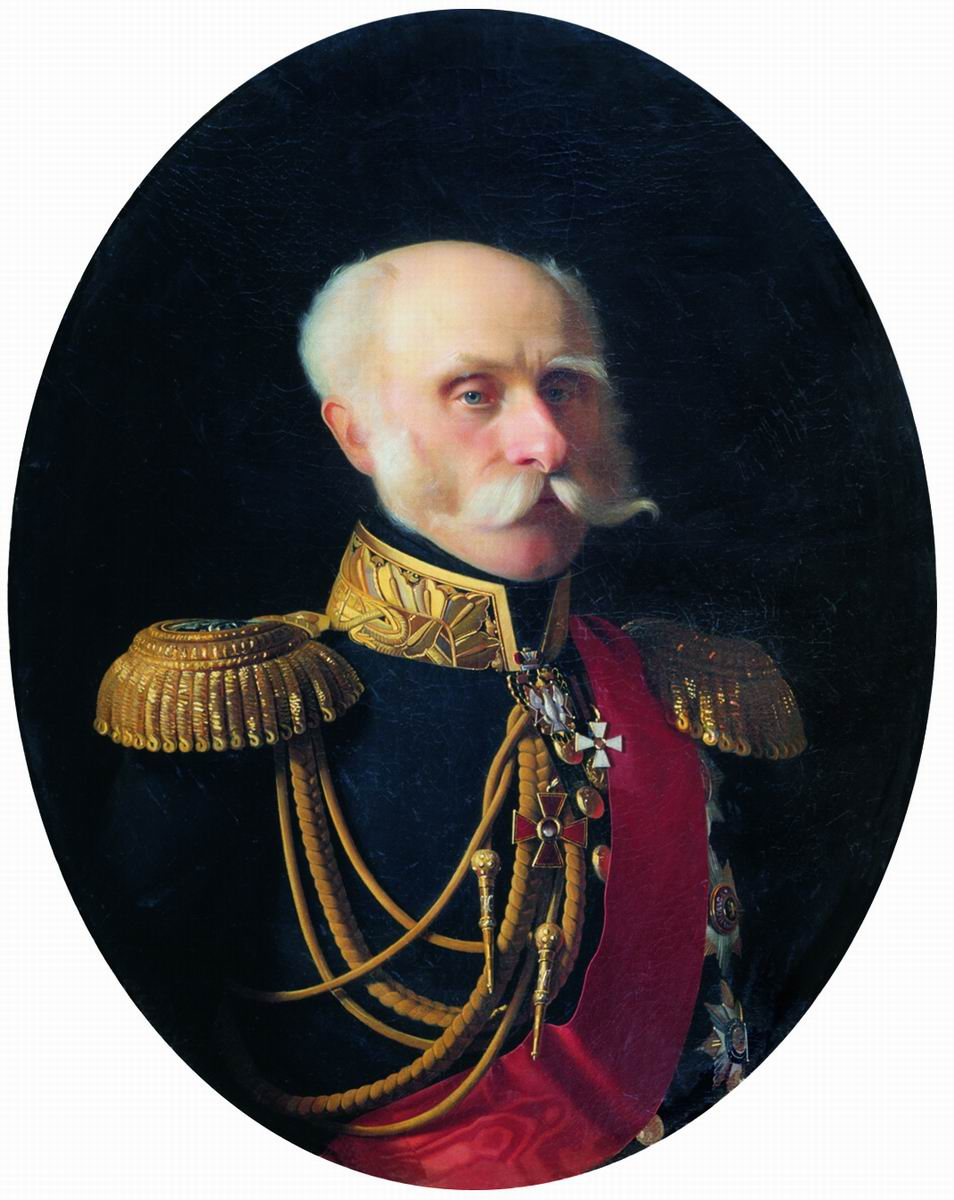
Portrait by Sergey Zaryanko, 1854

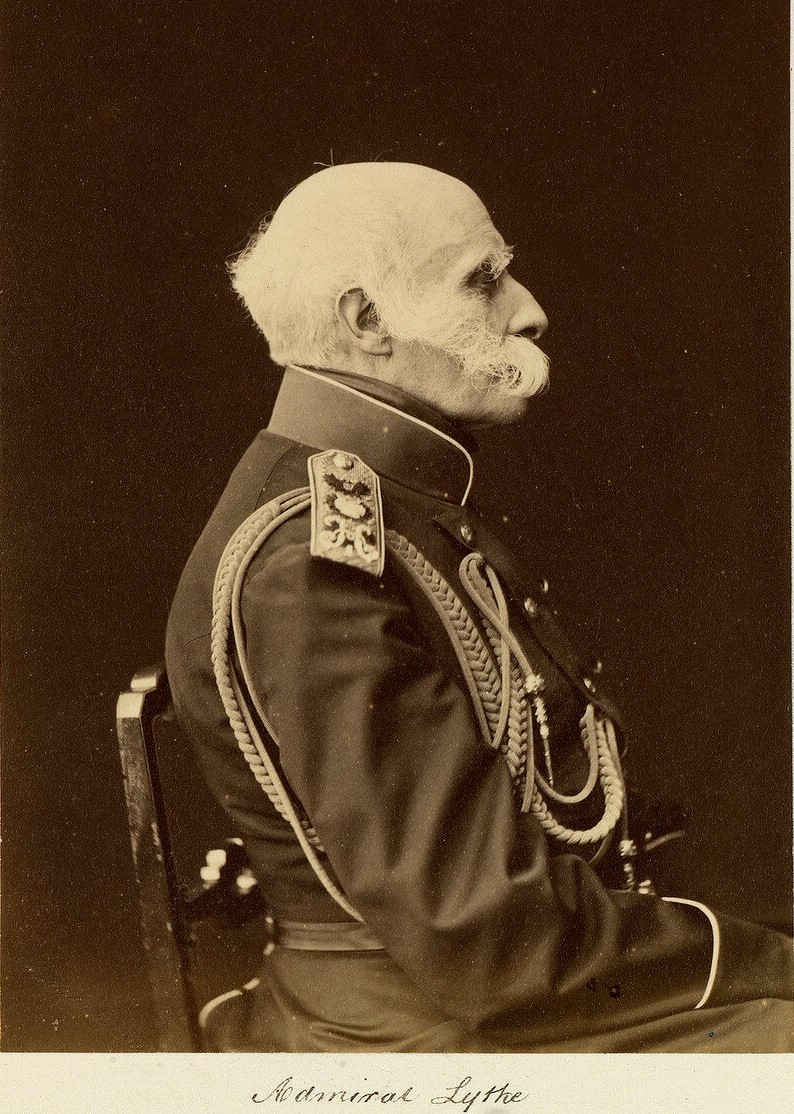
von Lütke in 1874

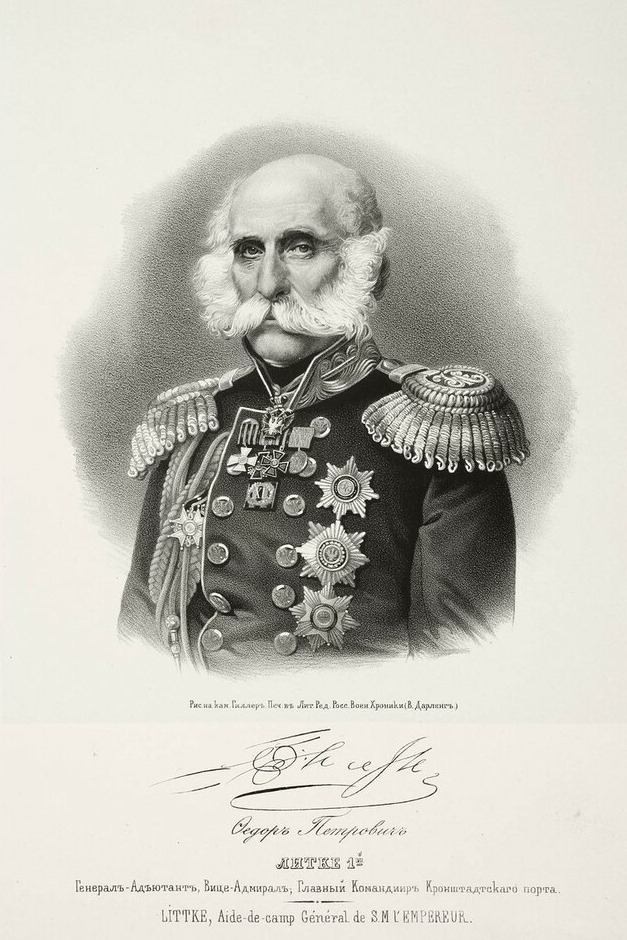
Lithograph by Pyotr Borel, based on a photograph by Andrey Denyer

Friedrich Benjamin Graf von Lütke (Russian: Фёдор Петрович Литке, romanized: Fyodor Petrovich Litke; 28 September [O.S. 17 September] 1797 – 20 August [O.S. 8 August] 1882) was a Russian navigator, geographer, and Arctic explorer. He became a count in 1866, and an admiral in 1855. He was a corresponding member (1829), honorable member (1855), and president (1864) of the Russian Academy of Science in St. Petersburg. He was also an Honorable Member of many other Russian and foreign scientific establishments, and a corresponding member of the French Academy of Sciences in Paris.

== Biography ==
Friedrich came from the Lütke family (ru) of Brandenburgish origin and originated in Jüterbog. Count Lütke's grandfather was Johann Philipp von Lütke, a German Lutheran preacher and writer on physical science and theology. In 1745, Johann went from Germany to Moscow as pastor of a Lutheran parish in order to spread Lutheranism in the Russian Empire. As a youth, Friedrich attended a Lutheran German-speaking school. He remained a practicing Lutheran.

Lütke started his naval career in the Imperial Russian Navy in 1813. He took part in Vasily Golovnin's world cruise on the ship "Kamchatka" from 1817 to 1819, where one of his crewmates was Ferdinand Wrangel. Then from 1821 to 1824, Lütke led the expedition to explore the coastline of Novaya Zemlya, the White Sea, and the eastern parts of the Barents Sea. From August 20, 1826, to August 25, 1829, he headed the world cruise on the Senyavin, sailing from Kronstadt and rounding Cape Horn. At the beginning, he was accompanied from Copenhagen and the Baltic Sea by Capt. Mikhail Nikolaievich Staniukovich who was in command of the sloop Möller. The scientific team included Heinrich von Kittlitz (ornithologist), Karl Heinrich Mertens (botanist) and Alexander Postels (mineralogist).

During this voyage he described the western coastline of the Bering Sea, the Bonin Islands off Japan, and the Carolines, although he discovered only one new island (Eauripik, the expedition is noted for having visited every inhabited island in the Caroline Islands (with the exception of Yap) and for compiling an extensive ethnographic account. In particular, the expedition spent three weeks in the Nomoi Islands, which had been last visited by Pedro Quiros in 1565. The team collected over 8000 plant, animal and mineral samples.

In 1835, Lütke was appointed by Tsar Nicholas I of Russia as tutor of his second son, Grand Duke Constantine Nicholaievich of Russia. Lütke was the first one to come up with the idea of a recording tide measurer (1839). They were built and installed along the coastlines of the Arctic Ocean and the Pacific Ocean in 1841. Lütke was one of the organizers of the Russian Geographical Society and its president in 1845–1850 and 1857–1872. He was appointed Chairman of the Naval Scientific Committee in 1846. Lütke was a commander-in-chief and a military governor of the ports of Reval (today's Tallinn) and later Kronstadt in 1850–1857. In 1855, Litke became a member of the Russian State Council (Государственный совет in Russian; a legislative entity that predated the Duma, which came into existence only in 1906).

In 1873, the Russian Geographical Society introduced the Lütke gold medal. A cape, peninsula, mountain and bay in Novaya Zemlya, as well as a group of islands in Franz Josef Land, Baydaratskaya Bay, and the Nordenskiöld Archipelago and a strait between Kamchatka and Karaginsky Island, as well as two Russian icebreakers were named after him.

Nereocystis luetkeana was named after him by Mertens (first as Fucus luetkeanus) and then described by Postels and Ruprecht.

Ships named after Lütke include 1909-built icebreaker, 1970-built icebreaker, and 2017-built Yamalmax LNG carrier.

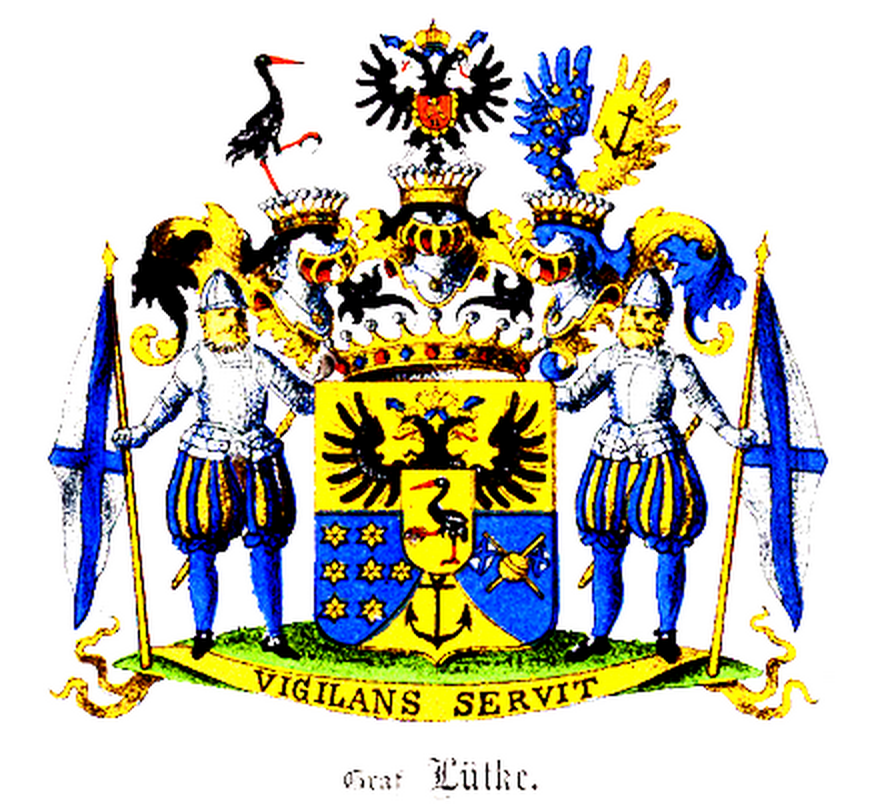
Coat of arms of the Lütke family (ru) of 1866, in the Baltic Coat of arms book by Carl Arvid von Klingspor in 1882.

== Lütke's contribution to the geography of Alaska ==
During his voyage round the world on the Russian corvette Seniavin Lütke arrived at Sitka in 1827. From there he sailed to Unalaska, surveying the Pribilof Islands, St. Matthew Island and the Commander Islands, before arriving to Petropavlovsk, a harbor which he used as a base for further surveys along the Siberian coast all the way to St. Lawrence Bay by the Bering Strait.

After finally returning to Kronstadt Litke published a 3-volume account of his explorations with atlases in Russian and in French, the latter being published in Paris and entitled Voyage autour du monde, : exécuté par ordre de sa majesté l’empereur Nicolas Ier, sur la corvette Le Séniavine, dans les années 1826, 1827, 1828 et 1829, par Frédéric Lutké, ... commandant de l’expédition. Partie historique, avec un atlas, litographié d’après les dessins originaux d’Alexandre Postels et du baron Kittlitz. Traduit du russe sur le manuscrit original, sous les yeux de l’auteur, par le conseiller d’état F. Boyé. Tome I–III. Very few copies were printed and especially the Russian original work with its nautical part became an extremely rare item.

The nautical volume contains hydrographic and geographic details on the then little-known Bering Sea and Alaska obtained not only from Lütke's own work but also from various previously unpublished Russian sources. Even though there were errors and delays in the publication that didn't satisfy the author, Lütke's work is a valuable source of information on the evolution of geographic knowledge of Alaska and the Bering Sea. When W. H. Dall published an index for the book, Lütke's name was given as "Lutke", which reflects the spelling under which the book was published in Paris.

Certain geographic features of the Alaskan coast, like the Walrus and Kritskoi Islands, Kudobin Islands and numerous other features in the Aleutians, were named by Count Lütke in the maps that were subsequently published. The landhead now named Cape Lutke in Alaska was named after this Russian explorer by the Imperial Russian Hydrographic Service in 1847. The Litke Deep is named in his honour.

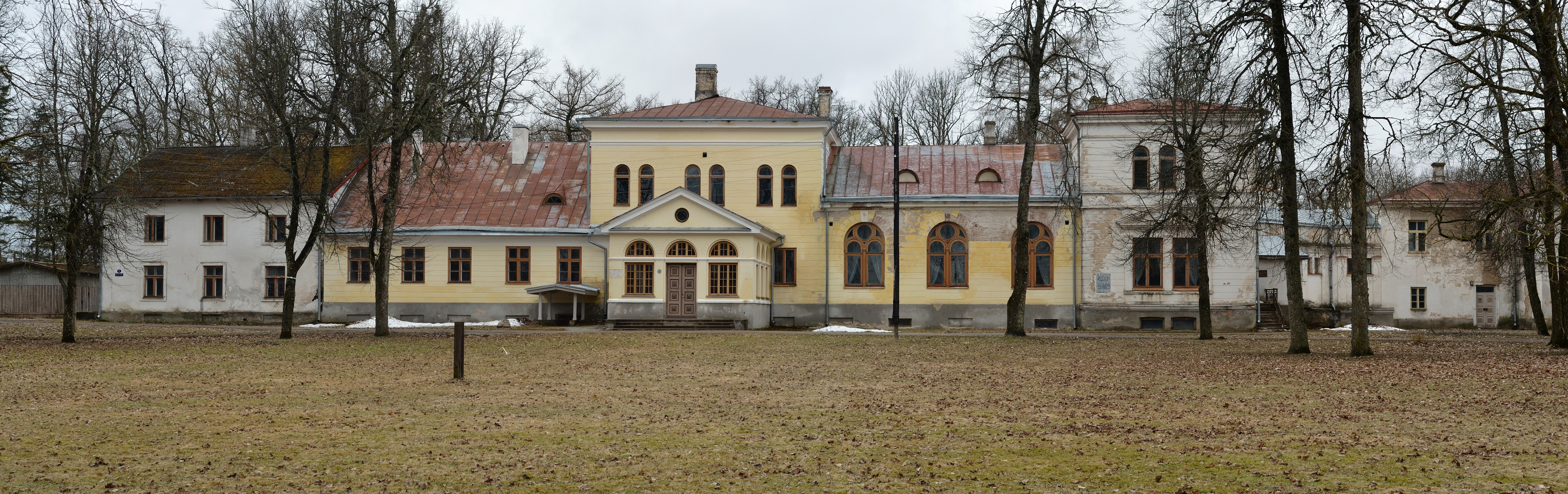
Admiral v. Lütke's manor in Avanduse, present-day Estonia

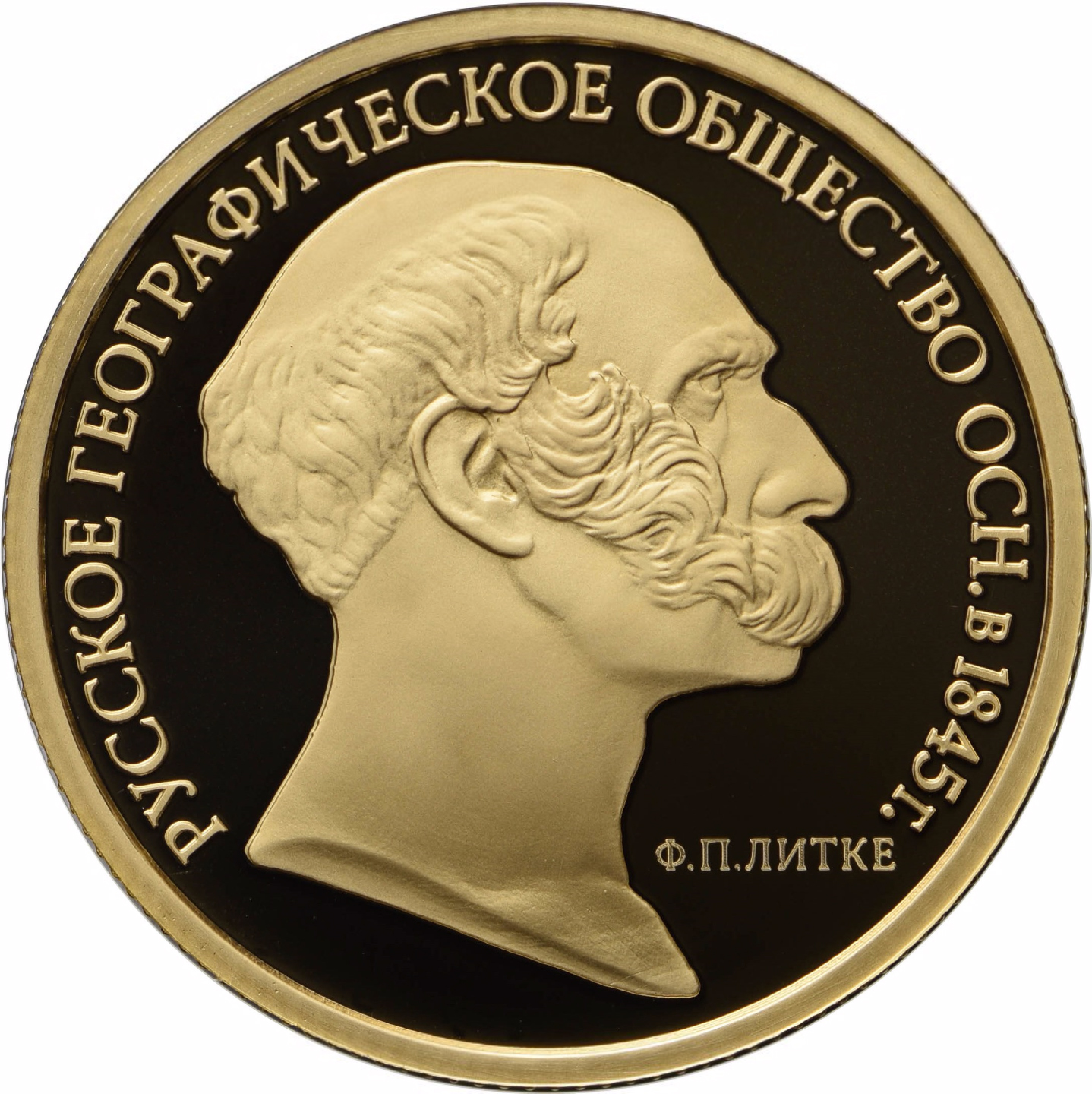
Gold commemorative coin of the Bank of Russia in the denomination of 50 roubles (2015). Russian Geographical Society founded in 1845. F. P. Litke

== In the stamps ==
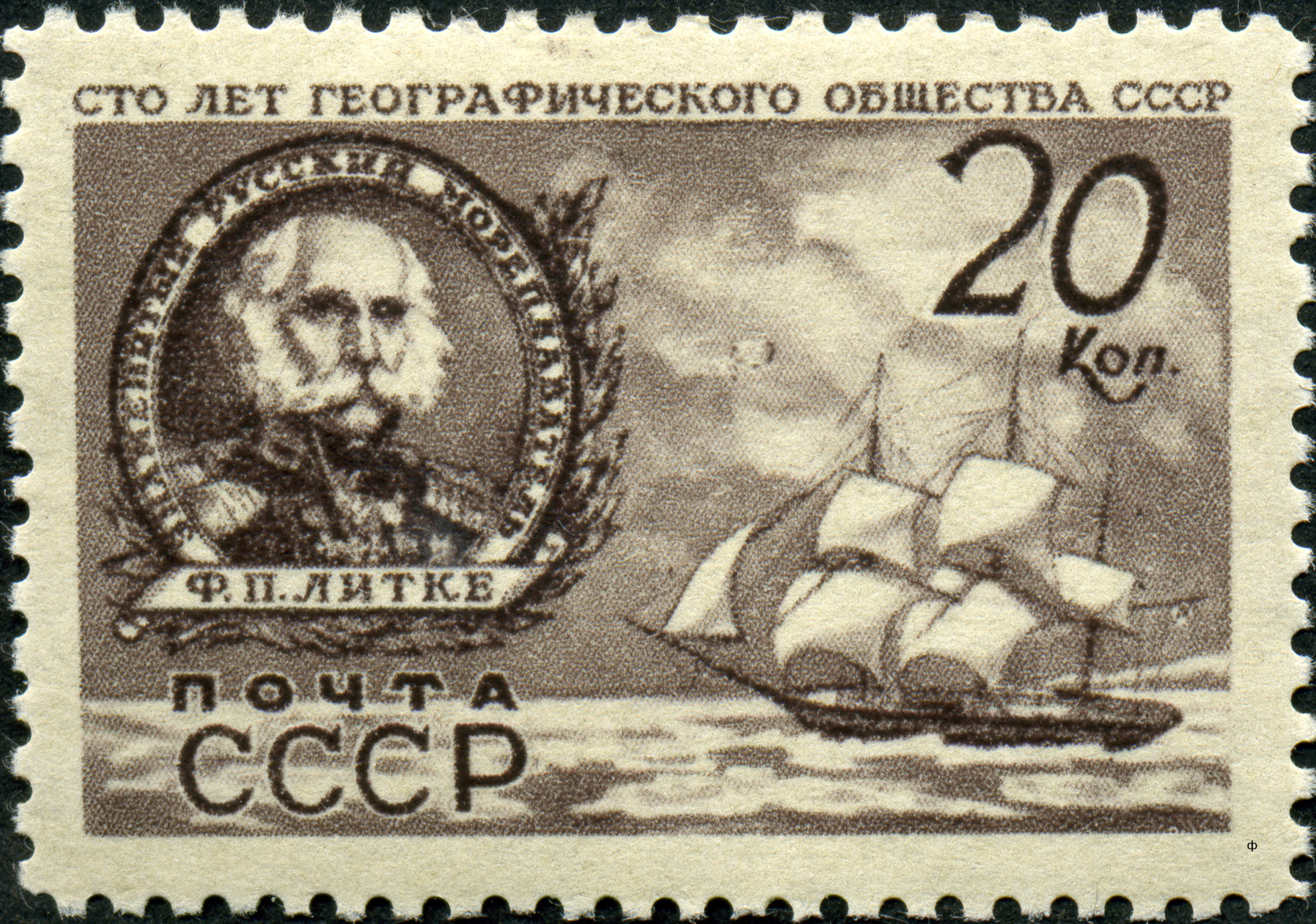
Postage stamp of the USSR, 1947

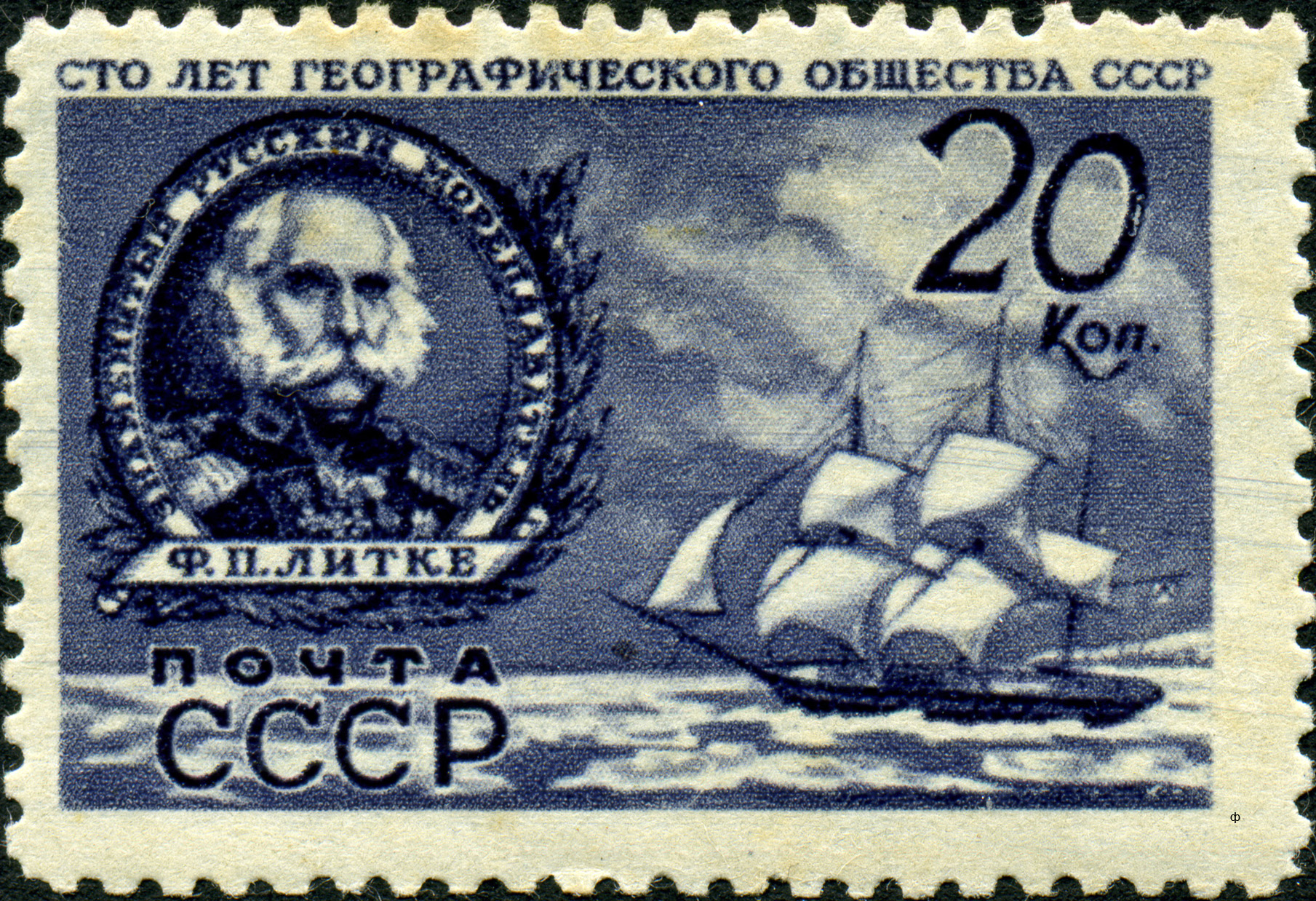
Count Lütke's portrait on a 1947 Soviet postage stamp in a series issued to commemorate the centennial of the Russian Geographical Society.

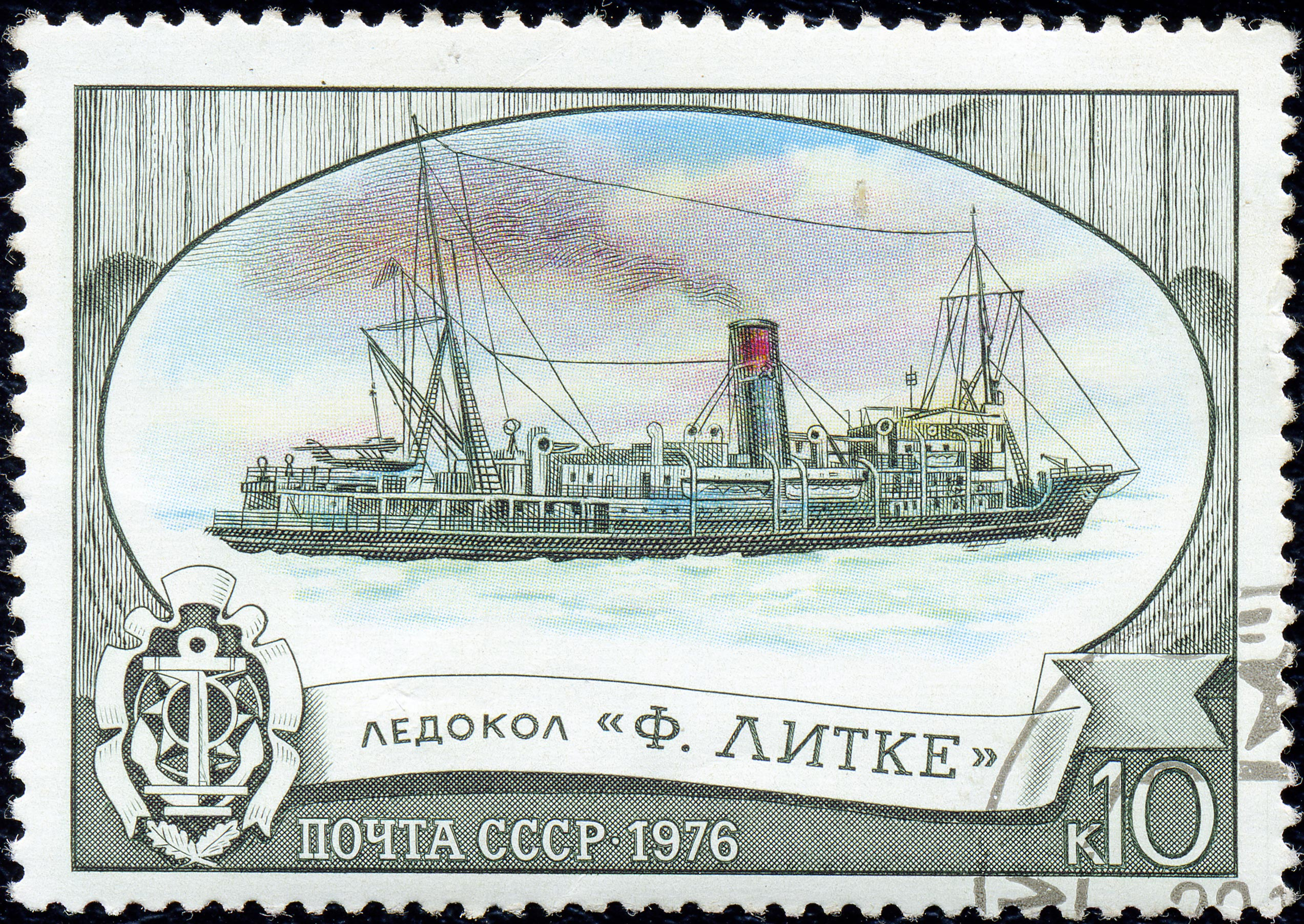
Postage stamp of the USSR, 1976: Fyodor Litke (1909 icebreaker)

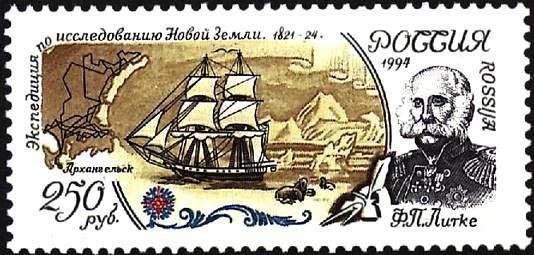
F. P. Litke on a Russian postage stamp, 1994

== See also ==
- European and American voyages of scientific exploration
- List of Baltic German scientists

== Sources ==
- "Литке, Федор Петрович" . Brockhaus and Efron Encyclopedic Dictionary (in Russian). 1906.

== Sources ==
- von Klingspor, Carl Arvid, ed. (1882). "Baltisches Wappenbuch : Wappen sämmtlicher der Ritterschaften von Livland, Estland, Kurland und Oesel zugehöriger Adelsgeschlechter | DIGAR" [Baltic heraldic coat of arms all, belonging to the knighthoods of Livonia, Estonia, Courland and Oesel noble families]. www.digar.ee (in Estonian). F & G Beijer.

Academic offices
Preceded by Dmitry Bludov	President of the Russian Academy of Sciences; 1864–1882	Succeeded by Dmitry Tolstoy
