= Fyodor Litke (1970 icebreaker) =

History

→ Soviet Union → Russia
- Name: Fyodor Litke (Фёдор Литке)
- Namesake: Friedrich Benjamin von Lütke
- Operator: Sakhalin Shipping Company (1970–2000); Sakhalin Basin Emergency Department (2000–2013)
- Port of registry: Kholmsk, Soviet Union (1970–1992); Vanino, Russia (1992–2000); Kholmsk, Russia (2000–2013)
- Builder: Admiralty Shipyard (Leningrad, USSR)
- Yard number: 780
- Laid down: 12 January 1970
- Launched: 29 July 1970
- Completed: 14 December 1970
- Decommissioned: 2013
- In service: 1970–2013
- Identification: IMO number: 7020085
- Fate: Broken up in 2010

General characteristics (as built)
- Class & type: Dobrynya Nikitich-class icebreaker
- Displacement: 2,935 t (2,889 long tons)
- Length: 67.7 m (222 ft)
- Beam: 18 m (59 ft)
- Draught: 5.35 m (17.6 ft)
- Depth: 8.3 m (27.2 ft)
- Installed power: 3 × 13D100 (3 × 1,800 hp)
- Propulsion: Diesel-electric; three shafts (2 × 2,400 hp + 1,600 hp)
- Speed: 15 knots (28 km/h; 17 mph)
- Range: 5,700 nautical miles (10,600 km; 6,600 mi) at 13 knots (24 km/h; 15 mph)
- Endurance: 17 days
- Complement: 42

General characteristics (after refit)
- Installed power: 3 × 10D20 (3 × 1,800 hp)
- Notes: Otherwise same as built

Fyodor Litke (Russian: ХФёдор Литке) was a Soviet and later Russian icebreaker in service from 1970 until 2013. It was one of twelve Project 97A icebreakers built by Admiralty Shipyard in Leningrad in 1961–1971.

== Description ==
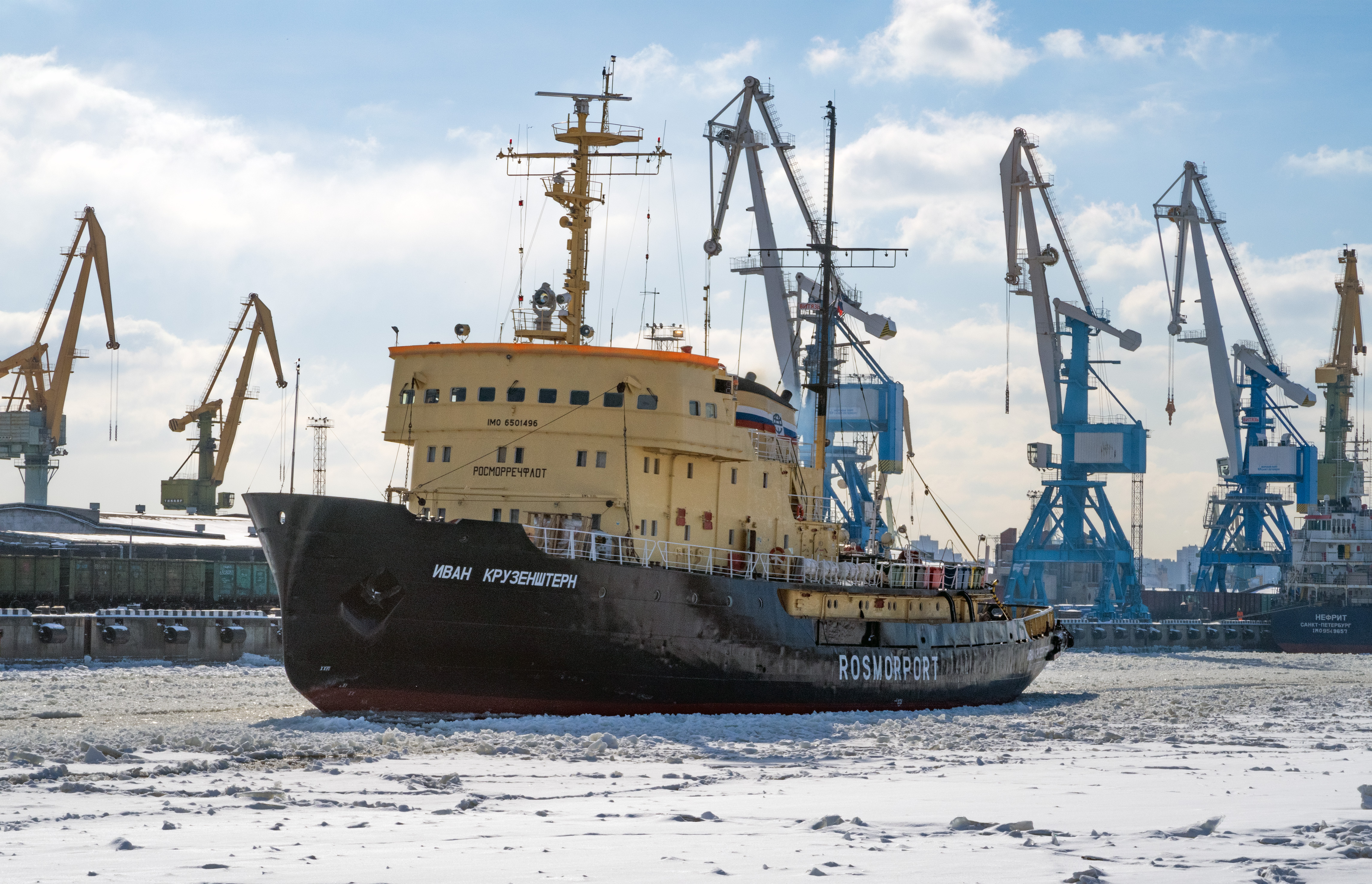
Ivan Kruzenstern, a similar Project 97A icebreaker

In the mid-1950s, the Soviet Union began developing a new diesel-electric icebreaker design based on the 1942-built steam-powered icebreaker Eisbär to meet the needs of both civilian and naval operators. Built in various configurations until the early 1980s, the Project 97 icebreakers and their derivatives became the largest and longest-running class of icebreakers and icebreaking vessels built in the world. Of the 32 ships built in total, the unarmed civilian variant Project 97A was the most numerous with twelve icebreakers built in 1961–1971.

Project 97A icebreakers were 67.7 metres (222 ft) long overall and had a beam of 18 metres (59 ft). Fully laden, the vessels drew 5.35 metres (17.6 ft) of water and had a displacement of 2,935 tonnes (2,889 long tons). Their three 1,800-horsepower (1,300 kW) 10-cylinder 13D100 two-stroke opposed-piston diesel engines were coupled to generators that powered electric propulsion motors driving two propellers in the stern and a third one in the bow. Project 97A icebreakers were capable of breaking 70 to 75 centimetres (28 to 30 in) thick snow-covered ice at very slow but continuous speed.

== History ==
The tenth of twelve Project 97A icebreakers was laid down at Admiralty Shipyard in Leningrad on 12 January 1970, launched on 29 July 1970, and delivered to the Sakhalin Shipping Company on 14 December 1970. The vessel was named Fyodor Litke after Friedrich Benjamin von Lütke, a German-Russian navigator, geographer, and Arctic explorer. The icebreaker operated in the Russian Far East and was stationed in Kholmsk.

In 1988, Fyodor Litke was reportedly re-engined with 10D20 diesel engines with the same rating as the original power plant.

Following the dissolution of the Soviet Union, Fyodor Litke passed over to the successor state, Russia, and its port of registry was changed to Vanino.

In 2000, Fyodor Litke was transferred to Sakhalin Basin Emergency Department and its port of registry changed back to Kholmsk.

On 2 March 2002, Fyodor Litke collided with the ferry Sakhalin-10 in the port of Vanino. Both vessels received superficial damage.

Fyodor Litke was taken out of service in 2013 and sold to China for scrapping in June 2014.
