= Pauliku =

Village in Estonia

- Village
- Location in Estonia
- Coordinates: 59°21′01″N 27°22′51″E
- Country: Estonia
- County: Ida-Viru County
- Municipality: Jõhvi Parish

Population (2011 Census)
  - Total: 70

Pauliku is a village in Jõhvi Parish, Ida-Viru County in northeastern Estonia. It is located just southwest of the town of Jõhvi and northwest of Ahtme, district of Kohtla-Järve. Pauliku is bordered by the Tallinn–Narva railway to the north and Tammiku spoil tip to the south. As of the 2011 census, the settlement's population was 70.
