= Pajualuse =

Village in Estonia

- Village
- Location in Estonia
- Coordinates: 59°19′03″N 27°23′04″E
- Country: Estonia
- County: Ida-Viru County
- Municipality: Jõhvi Parish

Population (2011 Census)
  - Total: 50

Pajualuse is a village in Jõhvi Parish, Ida-Viru County in northeastern Estonia. It is located about 4 km (2 mi) southwest of the town of Jõhvi and 2 km west of Ahtme, district of Kohtla-Järve, by the Jõhvi–Tartu–Valga road (E264). The entrance of the Viru oil shale mine is located to the south, in Kalina. As of the 2011 census, Pajualuse's population was 50.
