= Tammiku =

Tammiku may refer to several places in Estonia:

- Tammiku, Kohtla-Järve, a subdistrict of Ahtme district, Kohtla-Järve, Ida-Viru County
- Tammiku, Jõhvi Parish, a borough in Jõhvi Parish, Ida-Viru County
- Tammiku, Harju County, a village in Kose Parish, Harju County
- Tammiku, Järva County, a village in Järva Parish, Järva County
- Tammiku, Jõgeva County, a village in Põltsamaa Parish, Jõgeva County
- Tammiku, Lääne-Nigula Parish, a village in Lääne-Nigula Parish, Lääne County
- Tammiku, Haapsalu, a village in Haapsalu, Lääne County
- Tammiku, Väike-Maarja Parish, a village in Väike-Maarja Parish, Lääne-Viru County
- Tammiku, Vinni Parish, a village in Vinni Parish, Lääne-Viru County
