= Pargitaguse =

Village in Estonia

- Village
- Location in Estonia
- Coordinates: 59°20′42″N 27°26′33″E
- Country: Estonia
- County: Ida-Viru County
- Municipality: Jõhvi Parish

Population (01.01.2011)
  - Total: 77

Pargitaguse is a village in Jõhvi Parish, Ida-Viru County in northeastern Estonia. It is located just southeast of the town of Jõhvi and northeast of Ahtme district of Kohtla-Järve. As of 1 January 2011 the settlement's population was 77.
