= Edise =

Edise may refer to:

- Edişə, Jalilabad, village and municipality in the Jalilabad Rayon of Azerbaijan
- Edise, Estonia, village in Jõhvi Parish, Ida-Viru County, Estonia
