= Sompa =

Sompa may refer to:

- Sompa (film), a 2012 Indian Tulu-language film, also known as Rampa
- Sompa, Kohtla-Järve, a district of Kohtla-Järve, Estonia
- Sompa (village), a village in Jõhvi Parish, Estonia
- Nombiselo Sompa-Masiu, South African politician
