= Kotinuka =

Village in Estonia

Coordinates: 59°23′N 27°25′E

- Village
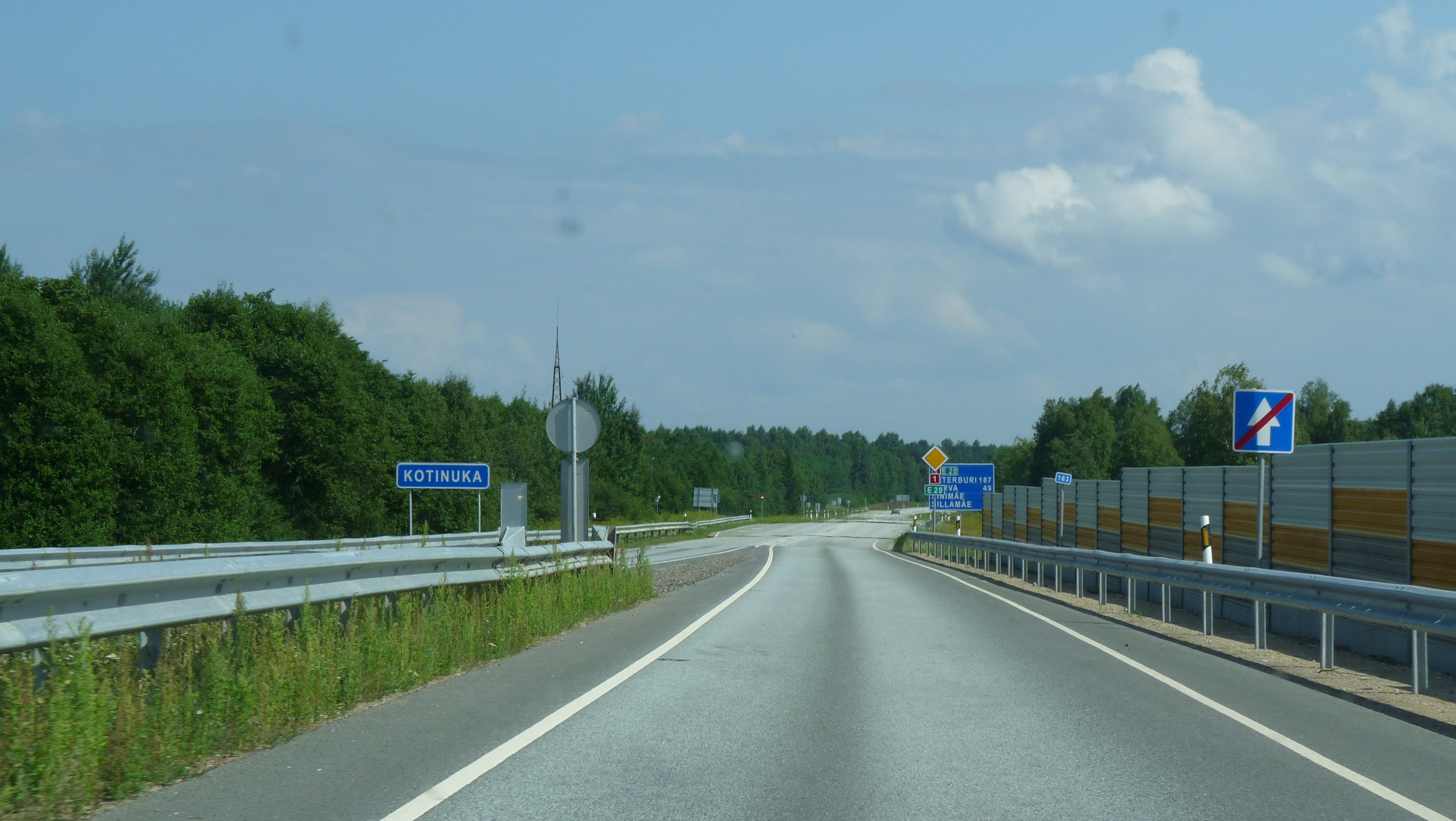
- Interactive map of Kotinuka
- Country: Estonia
- County: Ida-Viru County
- Parish: Jõhvi Parish
- Time zone: UTC+2 (EET)
  - Summer (DST): UTC+3 (EEST)

Kotinuka is a village in Jõhvi Parish, Ida-Viru County in northeastern Estonia. It is located just north of the town of Jõhvi.
