= Edişə =

Edişə or Edişa or Edisha or Yedysha may refer to:

- Edişə, Jalilabad, Azerbaijan
- Edişa, Khojavend, Azerbaijan
