= Linna, Ida-Viru County =

Village in Estonia

Linna
- Village
- Location in Estonia
- Coordinates: 59°21′30″N 27°28′02″E
- Country: Estonia
- County: Ida-Viru County
- Municipality: Jõhvi Parish

Population (2011 Census)
  - Total: 28

Linna is a village in Jõhvi Parish, Ida-Viru County in northeastern Estonia. It is located just east of the town of Jõhvi, around the Tallinn–Narva railway, and is bordered by the Tallinn–Narva road (E20) to the north. As of the 2011 census, the settlement's population was 28.

There's a concrete factory of Betoonimeister located in Linna village.
