= Jõhvi (village) =

Village in Estonia

Coordinates: 59°21′11″N 27°23′55″E

- Village
- Interactive map of Jõhvi
- Country: Estonia
- County: Ida-Viru County
- Parish: Jõhvi Parish
- Time zone: UTC+2 (EET)
  - Summer (DST): UTC+3 (EEST)

Jõhvi is a village in Jõhvi Parish, Ida-Viru County in northeastern Estonia. It is located just southwest of the town of Jõhvi.
