= Sompa, Kohtla-Järve =

District of Kohtla-Järve, Estonia

Coordinates: 59°20′N 27°17′E

Sompa
- District of Kohtla-Järve
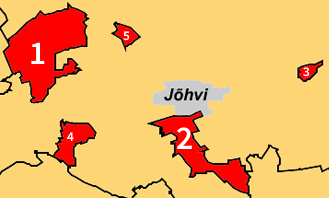
- Sompa (marked 4) and other districts of Kohtla-Järve
- Country: Estonia
- County: Ida-Viru County
- City: Kohtla-Järve

Population (31 Dec 2011)
  - Total: 958

Sompa is an exclave district of the town of Kohtla-Järve, Estonia.

== History ==
Initially empty an area, Germany planned to develop an oil shale mine but due to the course of the World War II, it remained a plan. The Soviet Union had similar designs for the area. Sompa exclave was originally designed in 1945 by document "Estonian republic Kohtla-Järve-Ahtme industrial region development plan" (originally called in Estonian: „Eesti Vabariigi Kohtla-Järve–Ahtme tööstusrajooni arenguplaani“) and its fortune was tied to the Sompa oil shale mine that was completed 1948 and first coal was extracted in December 1948. It was an underground mine and was built by using labor of German war prisoners.

In the beginning was supposed to be four equal centers Jõhvi, Kohtla-Järve, Ahtme ja Sompa, each having 22-25 000 residents. In 1945 was also created detail plan for the region in Leningrad by company called GIProŠaht and Sompa was supposed to have 15 000 residents. This meant fast rise of population in the region as at the end of the WW2 there was estimated 3000-4000 residents in other towns such as Kohtla-Järve and Kiviõli. 1960 common oil shale industrial region became reality. Settlements Jõhvi, Ahtme, Sompa ning Jõhvi were added to Kohtla-Järve in 1960. 1964 was created the Kohtla-Järve district that is equal to present day Ida-Viru County.

New general plan was made 1963 and there the number of local population was reduced even further for Sompa, keeping the number of residents at the same level that had been already achieved. The reason for this was that the first plan, based on what the population was sent to Sompa, was not fulfilled. Only 1/3 was done so Sompa development stopped 1963 and newest housing was 1960-1963 built Khrushchevkas with no further real estate development plans. In 1947 in Sompa was also opened Factory-Industrial School in support of the mining industry and for local population Sompa school 1948. From 1970s there was three attempts to close the mine due to its small output but in all cases it was postponed. Most of the new residents were Russian-speaking brought in from different corners of the Soviet Union with no ties to the local population.

With the collapse of the Soviet economy and state started the demise of Sompa as a single industry town and troubled 1990s began. Due to the centralized development, the center of the area (Kohtla-Järve) did not know what different regions did need and how to help the ones needing assistance. Sompa exclave became known as a criminal and dangerous area with limited opportunities. Typical problems were unpaid utility bills and hence, people, living in housing that was unheated and without electricity. The local public sauna was working on heating oil that was subsidized under Soviet Union was but too costly as Estonia has to import oil with world market prices, making the supply prohibitively expensive without extra funding. Small problem for a community as the Soviet planning never did consider building infrastructure for private washing facilities together with housing but rather public sauna for everyone to use. It also became normal to dump rubbish to growing number of abandoned buildings and there were occasional fires related to them. Also stories about residents of Sompa stealing different goods, example from local stores or potatoes from fields, started to circle in the local news papers from 1992. Local transportation was also a big problem as some lines were serviced so big intervals and small busses that not everyone could get on. The ones who did, were not able to even pull the ticket in crowded bus from pocket for registering and some did not do it intentionally cause ticket controllers were not able to get on. Metal theft was also common. In 1st of June 1993, man did end up in hospital and female turned into ashes due to being electrocuted as they tried to steal active high voltage cable supplying Sompa mine.

17th Nov 1993 radioactive materials were stolen from company Viru Geoloogia Sompa office. As per police, the stolen amount did not mount for any serious harm to population or environment. 01.11-15.11.1999 Sompa boiler house stopped working due to lack of heating oil needed to keep it going, not enough funds were available to buy more. 12.12.1999 December local boiler house again stopped working as 16 employees did not receive their salaries for five months, total amount in total amount of 215 000 EEK, leaving whole Sompa to freeze in cold. Heating crisis let to county level was a crisis meeting where was considered what to do with children and elderly in Sompa in case pipes burst. To push for payment of their salaries, employees simultaneously rendered their resignations. The boiler house management blamed the local residents as not everyone has paid their heating bills. In the next few weeks the missing salaries were paid and boiler house resumed its duties as all employees were rehired. In the end Kohtla-Järve town bought the boiler house from company operating it in December 1999. Due to the economic and social issues, Sompa did get different derogatory nicknames, in Estonian it was called "Eesti Detroit" (in English; Estonian Detroit) and in Russian it was called "Samõi Opasnõi Mesta Posle Amerike" ("Most dangerous place after America", coming from alphabets of the name Sompa, in cyrilic СОМПА). In 1990s for first time visitor, Sompa looked like a war zone.

Future of the mine became under doubt despite that the oil shale reserves in the area were estimated to last another thirty years in 1993. During the 1990s Sompa mine did suffer from lack of oil shale orders due to the import of cheaper oil shale from Russia and regularly sacked employees because of stealing company assets, mostly metal. There was also problem with recruitment as many younger locals did not wish to work in mining despite high unemployment in the region and stable jobs with high salary was available, reducing available workforce. The mine was closed finally in 1999 and remaining assets of Sompa mine were assigned under Estonia mine by state-owned company AS Eesti Põlevkivi. Initially there was hopes for larger foreign investment to develop alternative industry in Sompa but this was not realized. In 1992 population was estimated to be about 2500, in 2003 was 1600, 2015 was 928 and 2024 was 751 with population level stabilizing slowly since the beginning of 21st century.

By 2020, Sompa has become small and peaceful settlement with not much more criminal activities as other settlements in the region. Early 2024 Sompa saun was under risk of closure as the expenses were too high. Local community rallied in support and local council was able to reach in agreement with company operating the sauna. In 2026 budget is planned development of sporting and relaxation area in Sompa, budget of construction is 50 000 EUR. The local housing stock quality is very bad as not much has been built after 1963 and hence, empty buildings demolition program with government support is ongoing to improve environment. Empty former municipal flats in houses with acceptable condition are sold at the auctions with starting price 50-500 EUR to boost the local population numbers and revive the community. Around 2001 Sompa school was closed and building stayed empty until it was demolished in 2017. Now in the territory of the former school is a park with trees and exact location of building has a small symbolic monument, book with a quill.
