= Tammiku, Jõhvi Parish =

Borough in northeastern Estonia

Tammiku
- Small borough
- Location in Estonia
- Coordinates: 59°20′09″N 27°22′52″E
- Country: Estonia
- County: Ida-Viru County
- Municipality: Jõhvi Parish
- First mentioned: 1241

Population (2011 Census)
  - Total: 291

Tammiku (Estonian: [ˈtɑmːikˑu]; German: Eichenhain) is a small borough in Jõhvi Parish, Ida-Viru County, in northeastern Estonia. It is located about 3 km (2 mi) southwest of the town of Jõhvi and about 2 km (1 mi) northwest of Kohtla-Järve's Ahtme district. As of the 2011 census, the settlement's population was 291.

== Name ==
Tammiku was first mentioned as Damicas in 1241 in the Danish Census Book, and later as Tammykass in 1533 and Tammiku-Mõisaküla in 1945. The name (in the genitive case) comes from the common noun tammik 'oak forest', referring to the local vegetation.

== Notable people ==
Tammiku is the birthplace of Estonian amateur featherweight boxer Evald Seepere (1911–1990).
