= Salumets =

Family name

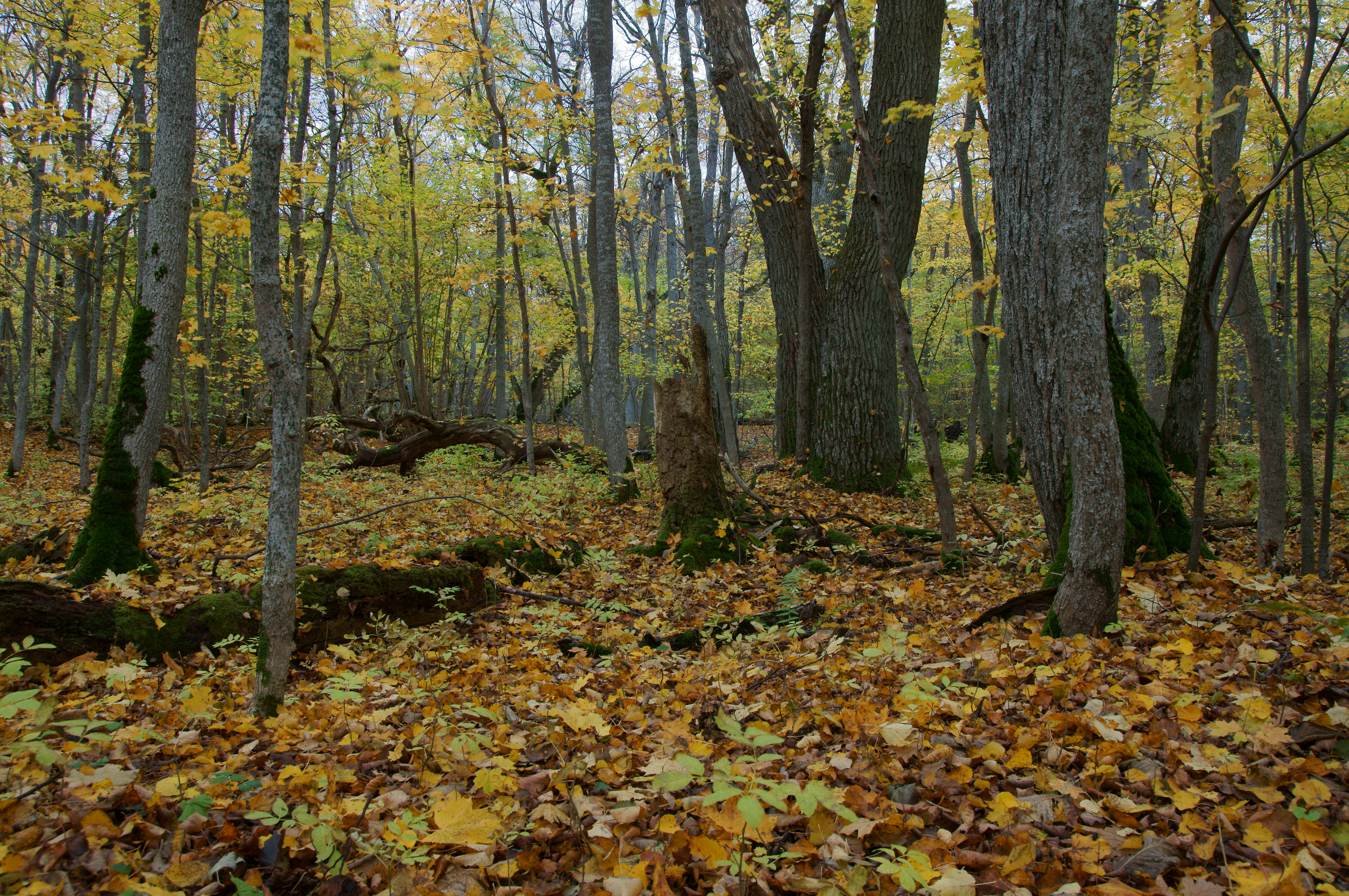
- A salumets forest type in Puhtu, Estonia

Origin
- Language: Estonian
- Meaning: "grove forest"
- Region of origin: Estonia

Salumets is an Estonian surname meaning "grove forest"; a compound of salu (grove/coppice) and mets (forest). As of 1 January 2021, 161 men and 197 women have the surname Salumets in Estonia. Salumets ranks 421st for men and 355th for women in the distribution of surnames within the country. The surname is most commonly found in Lääne County, where 6.81 per 10,000 inhabitants of the county bear the name.

Notable people bearing the surname Salumets include:

- Andres Salumets (born 1971), biologist and biochemist
- Jaak Salumets (born 1949), basketball player
- Vello Salumets (born 1950), musician, music historian, critic, and translator
