= Jõhvi Parish =

Municipality of Estonia (2005-)

Jõhvi Parish Jõhvi vald
- Municipality of Estonia
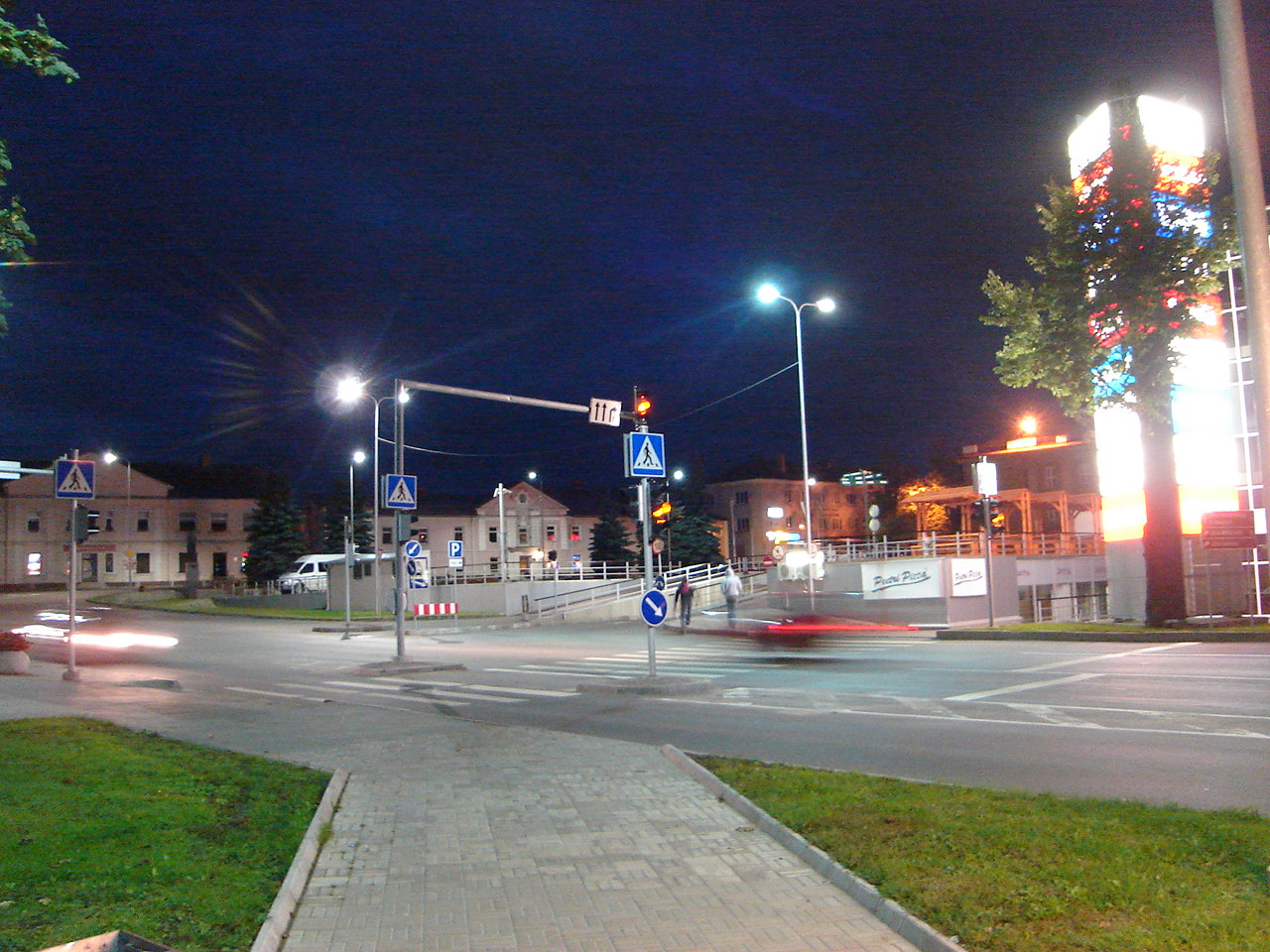
- The town of Jõhvi at night

- Flag Coat of arms
- Interactive map of Jõhvi Parish
- Coordinates: 59°22′N 27°25′E
- Country: Estonia
- County: Ida-Viru County
- Administrative centre: Jõhvi

Area
  - Total: 390 km^{2} (150 sq mi)

Population
  - Total: 15,590
  - Density: 40/km^{2} (100/sq mi)
- ISO 3166 code: EE-251
- Website: www.johvi.ee

Jõhvi Parish (Estonian: Jõhvi vald) is an Estonian municipality located in Ida-Viru County, consisting of the county capital Jõhvi and its environs. It has a population of 15,590 (2025) and an area of 390 km^{2} (150 sq mi).

It was formed following the merger of two former Ida-Viru County municipalities in 2025: Toila Parish and then Jõhvi Parish.

== Settlements ==
=== Towns ===
Jõhvi

=== Boroughs ===
Kohtla-Nõmme

=== Small boroughs ===
Tammiku, Toila, Voka

=== Villages ===
Altküla, Amula, Edise, Jõhvi, Järve, Kaasikaia, Kaasikvälja, Kabelimetsa, Kahula, Kohtla, Kohtla-Uueküla, Konju, Kose, Kotinuka, Kukruse, Linna, Martsa, Metsamägara, Mõisamaa, Ontika, Paate, Pajualuse, Pargitaguse, Pauliku, Peeri, Puru, Päite, Pühajõe, Roodu, Saka, Servaääre, Sompa, Täkumetsa, Uikala, Vaivina, Valaste, Vitsiku, Voka

== Religion ==
Religion in Jõhvi Parish (2021)
1. Unaffiliated (54.6%)
2. Orthodox (37.3%)
3. Lutheran (4.10%)
4. Others Christians (3.00%)
5. Others Religions (1.00%)
6. 0.00%

== Twin administrative entities ==
Jõhvi is twinned with:

- Loimaa, Finland, since 1997
- Uddevalla, Sweden, since 1997
- Kingisepp, Russia, since 1999
- Thisted, Denmark, since 2000
- Olecko, Poland, since 2006

== Notable people ==
- Peeter Põld (1878 in Puru – 1930), pedagogy specialist, school director, politician and the first Minister of Education
- Ülo Uluots (1930 in Jõhvi – 1997), politician, mining engineer, military historian and Minister of Defence in 1992
- Harri Tiido (born 1953 in Jõhvi), a senior diplomat.
- Toomas Asser (born 1954 in Jõhvi), medical scientist and Rector of the University of Tartu since 2018.
- Valentina Cherkasova (born 1958 in Jõhvi), a Soviet sport shooter; bronze medallist at the 1988 Summer Olympics
- Elmo Nüganen (born 1962 in Jõhvi), theatre and firm director, actor and artistic Director of Tallinn City Theatre since 1992.
- Üllar Saaremäe (born 1969 in Kohtla-Nõmme), actor, director, politician, and punk band singer.
- Eston Kohver (born 1971 in Jõhvi), Internal Security Service officer, detained by the Russian FSB in 2014 for a year.
- Andres Salumets (born 1971 in Jõhvi), biologist, biochemist, infertility expert and Professor at the Karolinska Institute
