= Daniel Veinbergs =

Estonians standup comedian (b. 1996)

- Born: Daniel Veinbergs; May 6, 1996 (age 30); Jõhvi, Estonia
- Education: University of Tartu (Journalism)
- Notable work: Päikesejänkud (podcast); Solo shows: Kohatu, Häbitu, Armutu

Comedy career
- Years active: 2012–present
- Medium: Stand-up comedy, podcasting
- Genres: Observational comedy, black comedy, satire
- Subjects: Estonian culture, politics, personal life, taboo topics
- Website: www.danielveinbergs.ee

Daniel Veinbergs (born 6 May 1996) is an Estonian stand-up comedian, podcaster, and entrepreneur. He began his career with the comedy collective Comedy Estonia before co-founding Huumoriklubi (The Humour Club). He is also the co-host of the popular Estonian podcast Päikesejänkud.

== Early life and education ==
Daniel Veinbergs was born on 6 May 1996. He grew up in Jõhvi before his family moved to Tallinn, where he attended a private school. He later studied journalism at the University of Tartu.

== Career ==
Veinbergs began performing stand-up in 2012 with Comedy Estonia, an organization founded in 2010 that was instrumental in establishing a stand-up comedy scene in the country. He was a regular performer on the group's tours, including the first major Estonian-language tours, "Esimene eesti keeles" (The First in Estonian) in 2015 and 2016. He also performed as a warm-up act for other comedians, such as Ott Sepp. In 2018, he debuted his first full-length solo show, Kohatu (Inappropriate).

Veinbergs is a co-founder of Huumoriklubi (The Humour Club), a comedy collective that organizes events and tours for Estonian comedians. Through Huumoriklubi, he has released several subsequent solo shows: Häbitu (Shameless, 2023), Armutu (Ruthless, 2024), and Rahutu (Restless, 2025).

Veinbergs has performed internationally in countries such as Australia, Germany, the United Kingdom, and Iraq. He also hosts the Estonian-language open mic night "Fopaa!" in Tallinn.

== Comedic style ==
Veinbergs's comedic style often involves personal anecdotes, social commentary, and controversial or taboo subjects. His material has covered his upbringing, mental health, relationships, and politics. Media outlets have sometimes referred to him as the "king of scandals" (skandaalide kuningas) for his provocative jokes.

== Other ventures ==
Since 2019, Veinbergs has co-hosted the weekly comedy podcast Päikesejänkud (Sunshine Bunnies) with fellow comedian Roger Andre. The podcast has produced over 230 episodes.

Veinbergs is the owner of the private limited company HÄBITU OÜ, which was registered in October 2022 and shares its name with his solo show. He also holds a minority share in Jõhvi Tehnopark OÜ, a technology park in his hometown.
