= Edise, Estonia =

Village in Estonia

Coordinates: 59°22′N 27°22′E

Edise
- Village
- Interactive map of Edise
- Country: Estonia
- County: Ida-Viru County
- Parish: Jõhvi Parish
- Time zone: UTC+2 (EET)
  - Summer (DST): UTC+3 (EEST)

Edise (German: Etz) is a village in Jõhvi Parish, Ida-Viru County in northeastern Estonia. It is located just northwest of the town of Jõhvi. It is mentioned in the Danish Census Book from the 13th Century CE.
