= Kose, Ida-Viru County =

Village in Estonia

Coordinates: 59°20′09″N 27°28′25″E

Kose
- Village
- Interactive map of Kose
- Country: Estonia
- County: Ida-Viru County
- Parish: Jõhvi Parish

Population (2011)
  - Total: 138
- Time zone: UTC+2 (EET)
  - Summer (DST): UTC+3 (EEST)

Kose is a village in Jõhvi Parish, Ida-Viru County in northeastern Estonia. As of 2011, there were 138 inhabitants of the village.

The Ida-Virumaa forestry centre of the Estonian State Forest Management Centre is located in Kose. The Kurtna Landscape Protection Area extends to the village.
