= Kukruse, Kohtla-Järve =

District of Kohtla-Järve

Coordinates: 59°23′54″N 27°20′50″E

Kukruse
- District of Kohtla-Järve
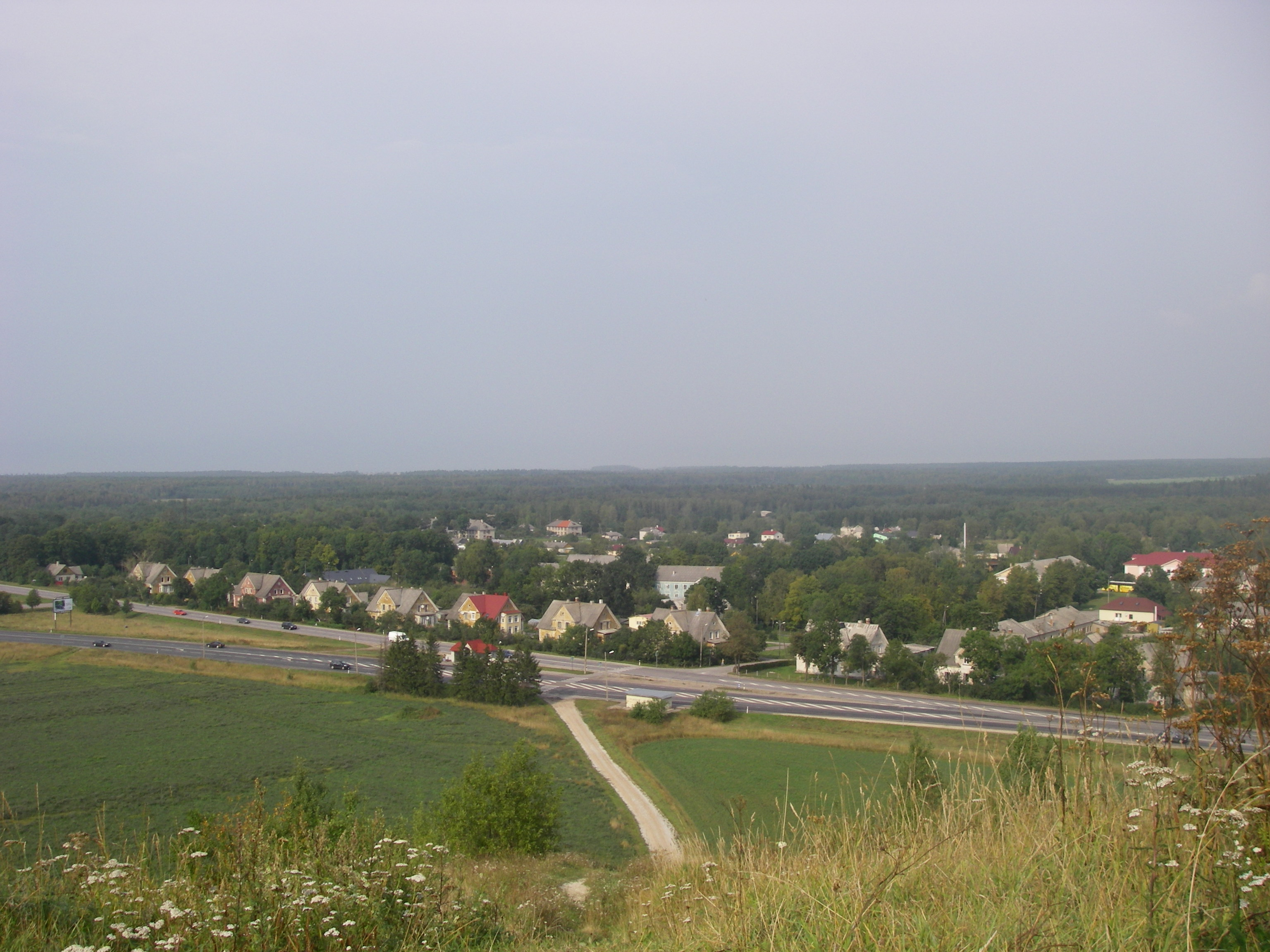
- View from the Kukruse slag heap

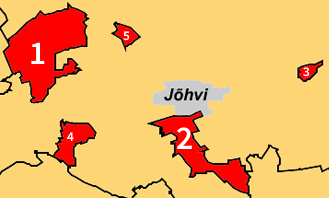
- Kukruse (marked 5) and other districts of Kohtla-Järve
- Country: Estonia
- County: Ida-Viru County
- City: Kohtla-Järve

Population (31 Dec 2011)
  - Total: 572

Kukruse is an exclave district of the town of Kohtla-Järve, Estonia.

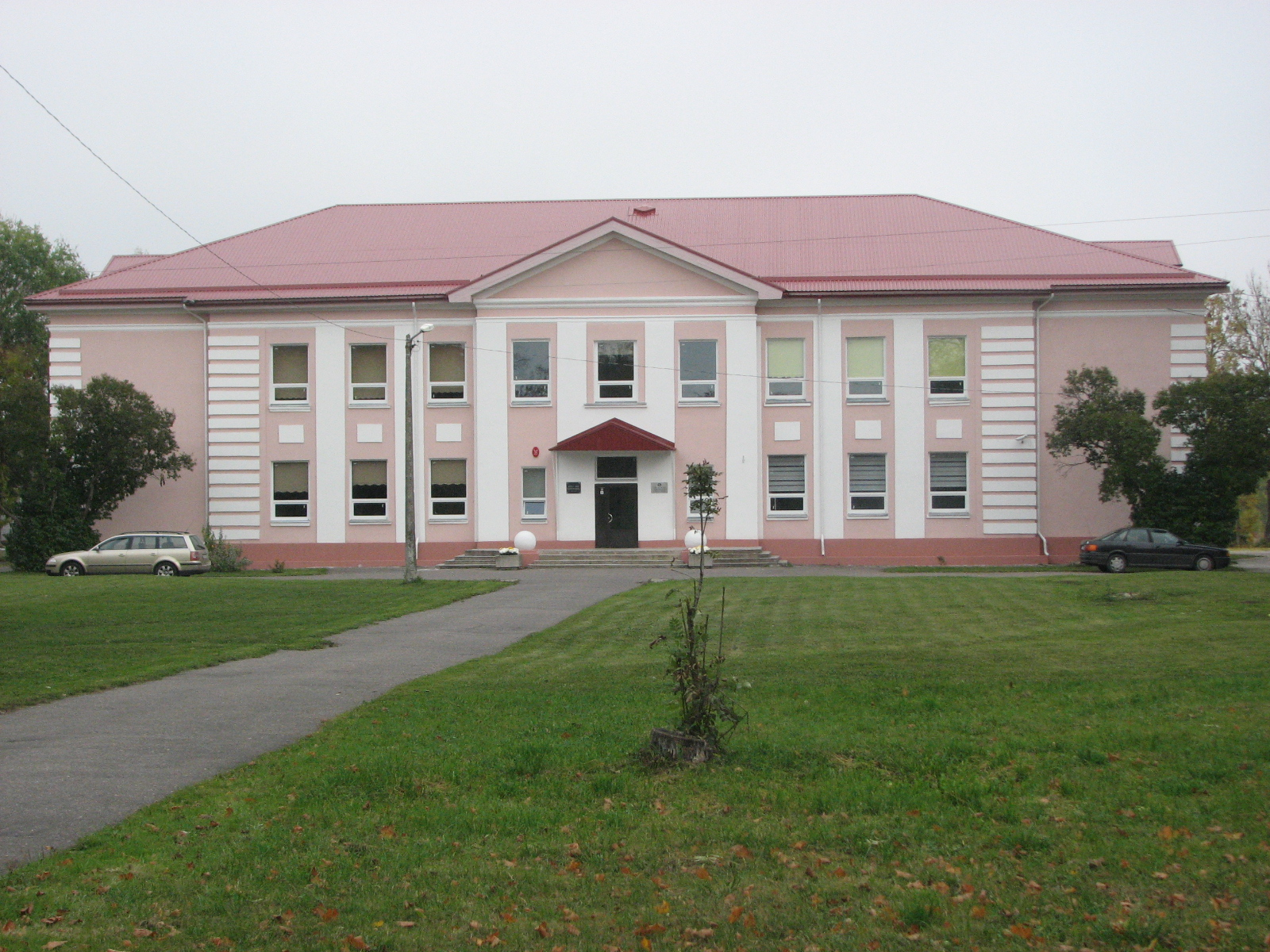
Tallinn Health Care College's Kohtla-Järve department
