= Oru, Kohtla-Järve =

District of Kohtla-Järve, Estonia

Oru
- District of Kohtla-Järve
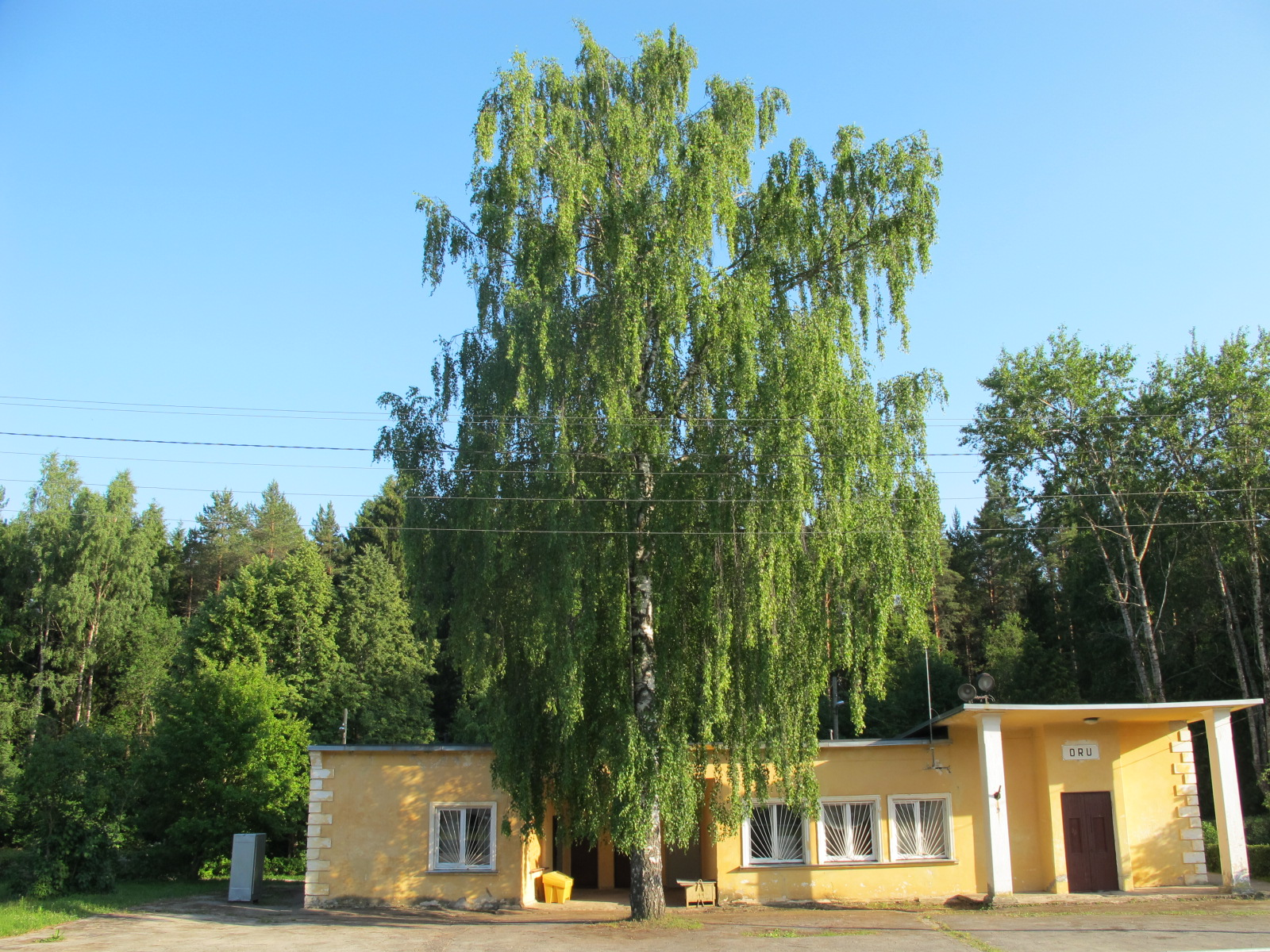
- Oru railway station

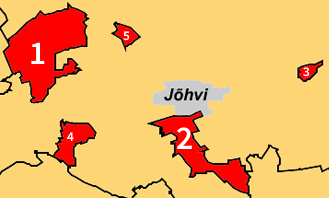
- Oru (marked 4) and other districts of Kohtla-Järve
- Coordinates: 59°22′12″N 27°34′11″E
- Country: Estonia
- County: Ida-Viru County
- City: Kohtla-Järve

Population (1 Jan 2012)
  - Total: 1,266

Oru is a settlement in Ida-Viru county, Estonia, surrounded by the Toila Parish but administered as an exclave district of the town of Kohtla-Järve which is located about 20 km (12 mi) to the west of Oru. The settlement was founded in connection with the construction of a plant producing peat briquettes in 1958. The population was 1266 according to the 2011 census.

Oru has a station on Edelaraudtee's eastern route.

Oru should not be confused with the Toila-Oru Park located in nearby Toila, which was also the location of Oru Palace.
