= Kahula, Estonia =

Village in Estonia

Coordinates: 59°20′N 27°20′E

Kahula
- Village
- Interactive map of Kahula
- Country: Estonia
- County: Ida-Viru County
- Parish: Jõhvi Parish
- Time zone: UTC+2 (EET)
  - Summer (DST): UTC+3 (EEST)

Kahula is a village in Jõhvi Parish, Ida-Viru County in northeastern Estonia.
