= Andres Salumets =

Estonian biologist and biochemist (born 1971)

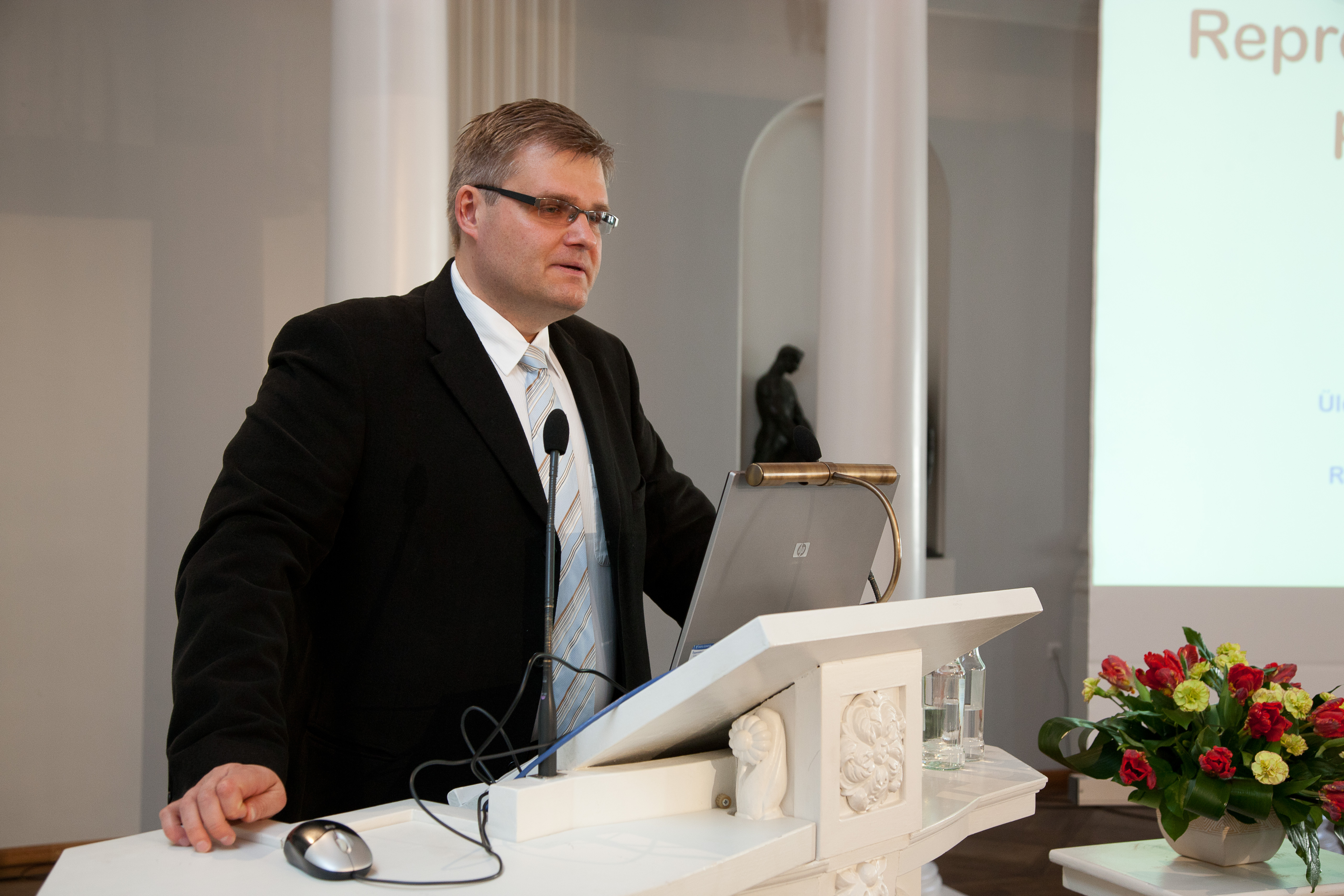
Andres Salumets in 2011

Andres Salumets (born 19 May 1971 in Jõhvi) is an Estonian biologist, biochemist, and international infertility expert. He currently is Professor of Reproductive Medicine at the Karolinska Institute.

== Education ==
He completed his undergraduate and graduate studies at the University of Tartu in 1993 and 1995, respectively. In 1995, he also became an embryologist at the Nova Vita Clinic, a private IVF provider in Estonia. In October 2003, he received his PhD at the University of Helsinki with the academic dissertation "Effects of embryological parameters on the success of fresh and frozen embryo transfers".

== Career ==
Following the completion of his PhD, he conducted research at the Estonian Biocentre (2004 - 2007). He became a faculty member at the University of Tartu in 2008. He became Professor of Reproductive Medicine at Karolinska Institute in September 2020. Salumets is currently a Member of the executive committee (2013–2015) of the European Society of Human Reproduction and Embryology and has published extensively in major scientific journals. He is also a Board Member at the Competence Center for Reproductive Medicine and Biology, as well as the Project Manager for the scientific synergy "Novel approaches for human infertility diagnostics" for the sub-project: "Endometrial receptivity: systems biology approach".
