= Sompa (village) =

Village in Estonia

Coordinates: 59°21′13″N 27°20′49″E

- Village
- Interactive map of Sompa
- Country: Estonia
- County: Ida-Viru County
- Parish: Jõhvi Parish

Population (2011)
  - Total: 87
- Time zone: UTC+2 (EET)
  - Summer (DST): UTC+3 (EEST)

Sompa (German: Sompäh) is a village in Jõhvi Parish, Ida-Viru County in northeastern Estonia.

== Name ==
Sompa was attested in historical sources as Soenpe in 1420 (referring to the village), Sompäh in 1496 (referring to the manor), and Sompæ in 1796 (referring to both the village and the manor). Andrus Saareste and Lauri Kettunen interpreted the e in the historical spelling Soenpe as an extension of the root and reconstructed the original form *Soonpää '(place at the) head/end of the swamp' (< Proto-Finnic soo 'swamp' + *pää 'head'). The n in the reconstructed name is the former ending of the Estonian genitive case (cf. Ingrian soo 'swamp', genitive soon), and it has changed to m through assimilation to the following p.
