= Tammiku, Harju County =

Village in Estonia

Coordinates: 59°12′14″N 24°55′35″E

Tammiku (Kose)
- Village
- Interactive map of Tammiku (Kose)
- Country: Estonia
- County: Harju County
- Parish: Kose Parish
- Time zone: UTC+2 (EET)
  - Summer (DST): UTC+3 (EEST)

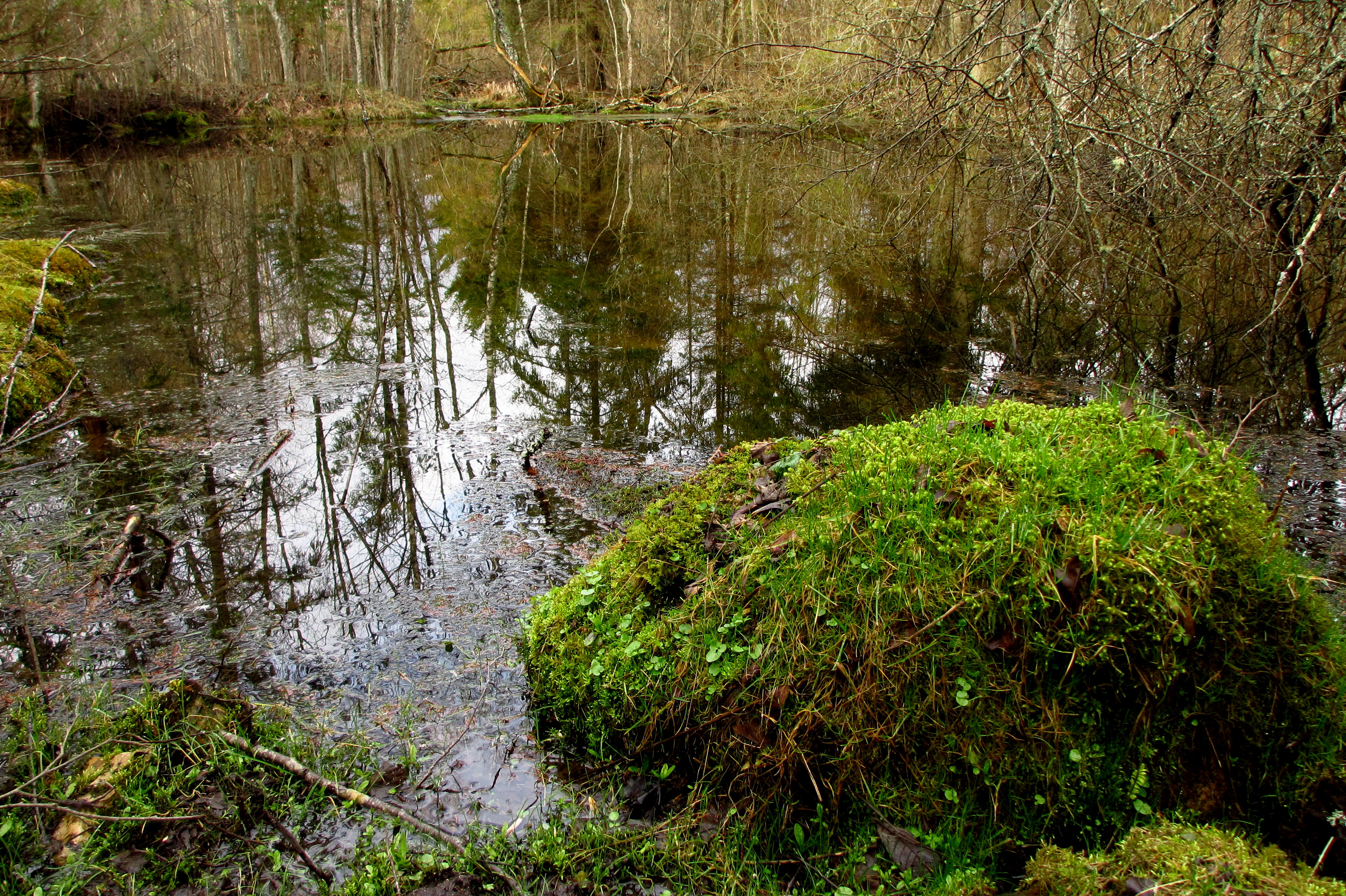
Tammiku Nature Reserve

Tammiku (German: Tammik) is a village in Kose Parish, Harju County in northern Estonia. Tammiku was the site of a 1994 unintentional disturbance of radiocaesium which resulted in one human fatality.

== Name ==
Tammiku was mentioned in written records as Tammick in 1637 and Tammiko mois in 1782, both referring to the manor there. The name (in the genitive case) comes from the common noun tammik 'oak forest', referring to the local vegetation.
