= Edişə, Jalilabad =

Edişə
- Municipality
- Location within Azerbaijan
- Coordinates: 39°10′43″N 48°15′04″E
- Country: Azerbaijan
- Rayon: Jalilabad

Population
  - Total: 710
- Time zone: UTC+4 (AZT)
  - Summer (DST): UTC+5 (AZT)

Edişə (also, Edisha and Yedysha) is a village and municipality in the Jalilabad Rayon of Azerbaijan. It has a population of 710.
