= Kohtla-Järve =

City in northeastern Estonia

- City
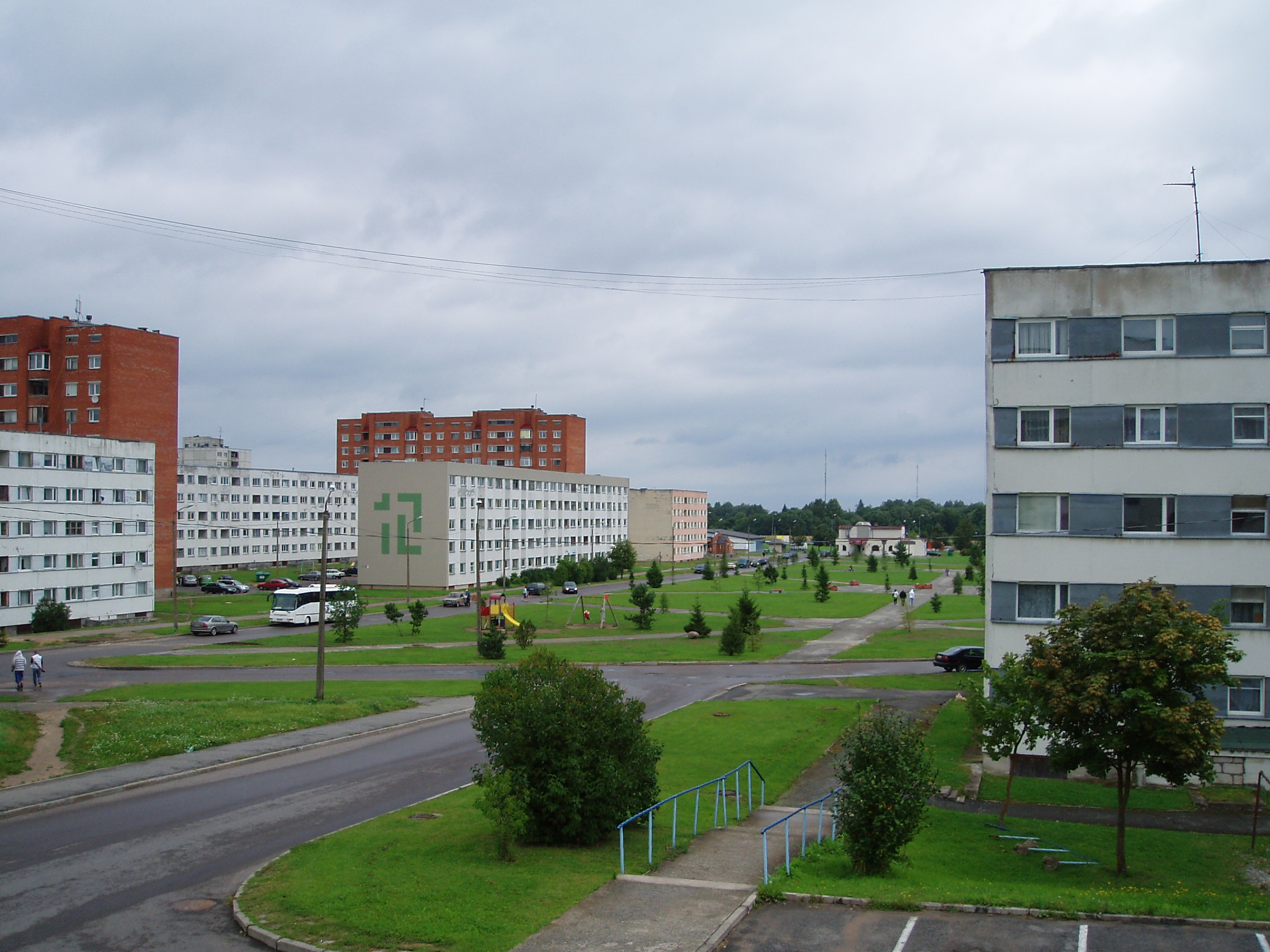
- Ahtme district of Kohtla-Järve in August 2009

- Flag Coat of arms

- Location in Estonia.
- Country: Estonia
- County: Ida-Viru County
- Founded: 1241
- City status: 1946

Government
  - Mayor: Max Kaur

Area
  - Total: 68.77 km^{2} (26.55 sq mi)

Population (2024)
  - Total: 33,434
  - Rank: 5th
  - Density: 486.2/km^{2} (1,259/sq mi)
- Time zone: UTC+2 (EET)
  - Summer (DST): UTC+3 (EEST)
- Postal code: 30199 to 41542
- Area code: (+372) 33
- ISO 3166 code: EE-321
- Website: www.kohtla-jarve.ee

Kohtla-Järve (Estonian: [ˈkohtlɑ ˈjærʋe]) is a city and municipality in Ida-Viru County, northeastern Estonia, founded in 1924 and incorporated as a town in 1946. The city is unusual among Estonian municipalities due to its discontiguous territorial span, being made of several separated parts, with the two largest of Kohtla-Järve proper (referred to as Järve) and Ahtme, both of which have populations of around 20,000 residents, being located about 10 kilometres (6.2 mi) apart, with the now separated town of Jõhvi located between them. Several other settlements in north-eastern Ida-Viru county are administratively districts of Kohtla-Järve. Kohtla-Järve is presently the fifth-largest city in Estonia in terms of population.

Industrial oil shale extraction, which began in the 20th century, and processing into petrochemical products have strongly shaped the city's development. During the 1944–1991 Soviet occupation, large numbers of immigrant workers were brought from Russia and other parts of the former USSR and populated the city turning the area which had been, as of 1934 census, over 90% ethnic Estonian, overwhelmingly non-Estonian in the second half of the 20th century. As of 2006, 21% of the city's population are ethnic Estonians; most of the rest are Russians.

== History ==
The history of Kohtla-Järve is closely tied to the history of extraction of oil shale – the main mineral of Estonia.

There is evidence that a number of settlements existed on the territory of modern Kohtla-Järve since the High Middle Ages. In the Danish Land Book, Järve and Kukruse villages were first mentioned in 1241 by the names Jeruius and Kukarus respectively, and Sompa village in 1420 by the name Soenpe. Its German name was Kochtel-Türpsal.

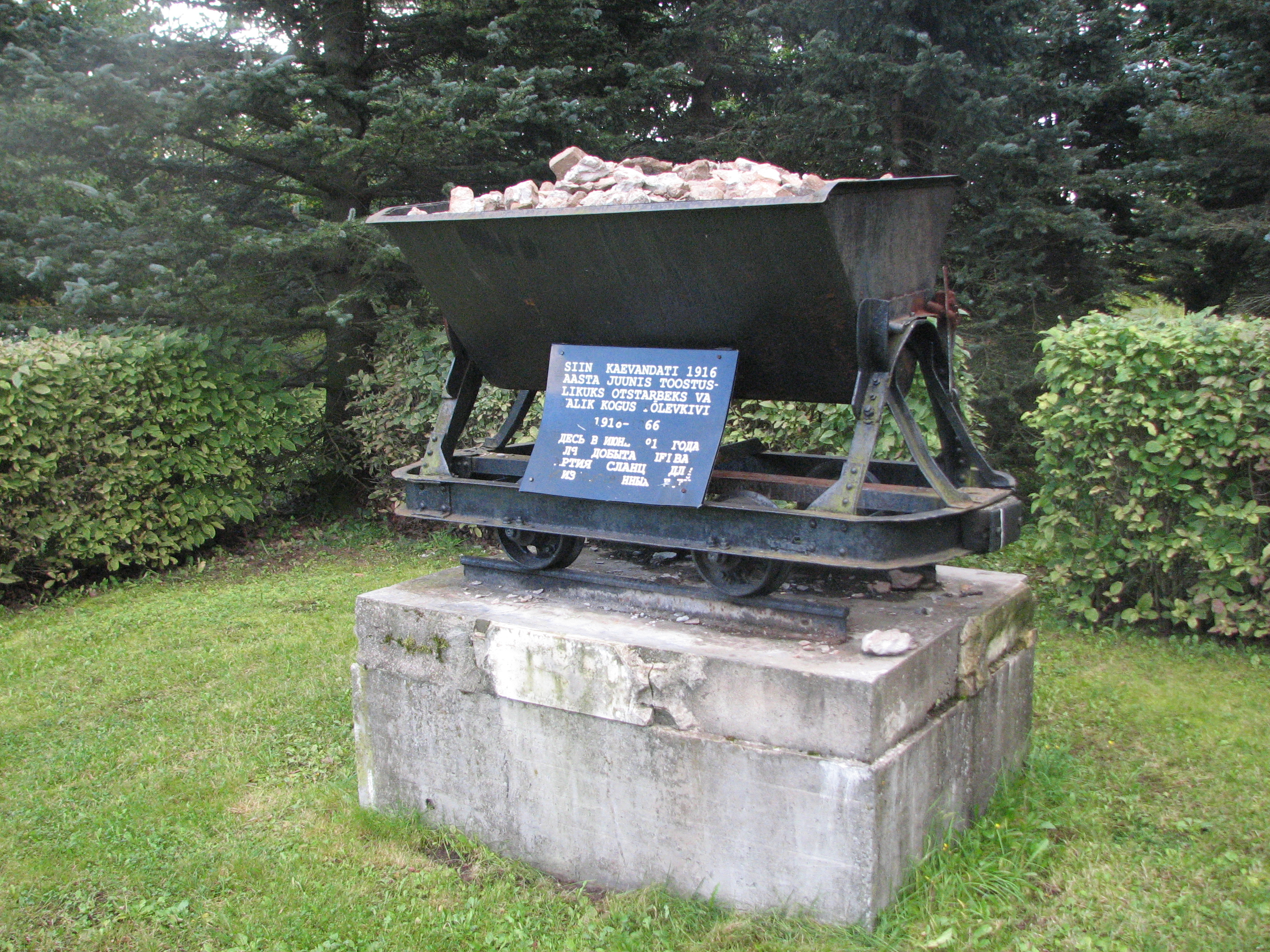
Monument to the beginning of industrial oil shale mining

Local residents were aware of oil shale's flammable capability in ancient times, but its industrial extraction in Estonia began only in the 20th century. In 1916, researches showed that oil shale could be used both as fuel and as a raw material for chemical industry, and mining started near Järve village. In 1919, the Estonian State Oil Shale Industrial Corporation was formed and extraction by shaft and open-pit mining was extended. Settlements for workers began to appear adjacent to the mines. In 1924 the oil shale processing factory was built near Kohtla railway station, and the nearby settlement, named Kohtla-Järve, started to grow.

During World War II the value of the Estonian oil shale deposit grew. The Germans, who occupied Estonia in 1941–1944, considered it as an important source of fuel. However, they failed to begin full-scale extraction.

After the war, the next occupier of Estonia, the Soviet Union, required constantly increasing quantities of oil shale for its industries and extraction greatly expanded.

Kohtla-Järve, as the main settlement in the mining area, received city status on 15 June 1946. Since that time, during the next twenty years, there was a process of administrative amalgamation of neighboring settlements within the limits of Kohtla-Järve. Kohtla and Kukruse were added to the city in 1949; Jõhvi, Ahtme and Sompa in 1960. The town of Kiviõli and the boroughs of Oru, Püssi and Viivikonna were subordinated to the city in 1964. Thus, Kohtla-Järve greatly expanded, becoming a city with a unique layout, as its parts remained scattered among woods, agricultural areas and oil shale mines.

After the end of the Soviet Union occupation, Estonia regained independence in August 1991, and thereafter the number of city districts decreased, as Jõhvi, Kiviõli and Püssi became officially separate towns. After the Estonian administrative reform of 2017, Viivikonna and Sirgala (combined population of 99) are also no longer part of the municipality.

== Geography ==
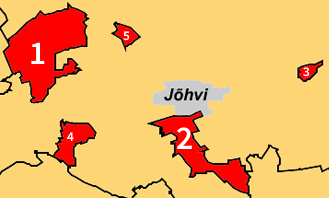
Administrative districts of Kohtla-Järve: 1-Järve, 2-Ahtme, 3-Oru, 4-Sompa, 5-Kukruse

Kohtla-Järve has a unique layout. The districts of the city are scattered across the northern part of Ida-Viru County in a considerably large area. The distance between Järve and Oru districts is about 20 km.

=== Districts ===
The city is subdivided into five administrative districts (Estonian: linnaosad):

Population per districts	2011	2016	2017	2021
Järve	17 054	15 869	15 952	15656
Ahtme	17 252	16 222	16 140	15602
Oru	1266	1133	1117	996
Sompa	958	873	870	754
Kukruse	572	550	529	467

== Demographics ==
Religion in Kohtla-Järve (2021)
1. Unaffiliated (49.1%)
2. Orthodox & Old Believers (44.6%)
3. Lutheran (2.10%)
4. Others Christians (2.00%)
5. Others Religions (2.20%)
6. 0.00%

Total population of the city increased mainly by workers sent from different parts of Soviet Union, reaching (with subordinated settlements) 90,000 in 1980.

The volume of oil shale extraction and processing decreased dramatically during the 1990s, and many Kohtla-Järve citizens moved to Tallinn or Russia, due to high unemployment in Ida-Viru County. The populations of many of the smaller exclaves have rapidly declined since the 1990s.

Ethnic composition 1959-2021
Ethnicity	1959		1970		1979		1989		2000		2011		2021	
Ethnicity	amount	%	amount	%	amount	%	amount	%	amount	%	amount	%	amount	%
Estonians	11926	40.9	20883	30.6	19197	26.4	16140	20.9	8479	17.8	5992	16.1	5298	15.8
Russians	-	-	37037	54.2	43077	59.3	50044	64.7	32843	68.9	27508	73.9	24646	73.6
Ukrainians	-	-	2009	2.94	2453	3.37	3062	3.96	1521	3.19	1007	2.71	1079	3.22
Belarusians	-	-	4022	5.89	3957	5.44	4061	5.25	2152	4.51	1341	3.60	1068	3.19
Finns	-	-	2020	2.96	1910	2.63	1705	2.21	887	1.86	417	1.12	316	0.94
Jews	-	-	205	0.30	178	0.24	158	0.20	57	0.12	45	0.12	37	0.11
Latvians	-	-	224	0.33	185	0.25	162	0.21	104	0.22	54	0.15	111	0.33
Germans	-	-	-	-	351	0.48	309	0.40	99	0.21	65	0.17	63	0.19
Tatars	-	-	-	-	148	0.20	204	0.26	118	0.25	77	0.21	70	0.21
Poles	-	-	-	-	453	0.62	435	0.56	280	0.59	174	0.47	171	0.51
Lithuanians	-	-	179	0.26	173	0.24	162	0.21	81	0.17	62	0.17	60	0.18
unknown	0	0.00	0	0.00	0	0.00	0	0.00	546	1.15	49	0.13	63	0.19
other	17262	59.1	1739	2.55	617	0.85	874	1.13	512	1.07	410	1.10	517	1.54
Total	29188	100	68318	100	72699	100	77316	100	47679	100	37201	100	33499	100

Ahtme, which has been a part of Kohtla-Järve since 1960, had a population of 11 215 in 1959, including 1847 (16.5%) Estonians.

== Economy ==
Kohtla-Järve is known for its chemical industry. It is the headquarters of Viru Keemia Grupp, an Estonian holding group of oil shale industry, power generation, and public utility companies. Eastman Chemical Company also has a manufacturing site located in Kohtla-Järve.

Since 2006, the Ukrainian DF Group has owned a fertilizer plant in Kohtla-Järve – it has (through its Austria and Cyprus based intermediaries) 100% ownership of AS Nitrofert. Established in 1993, AS Nitrofert was (as of 2006) the only plant to produce fertilizers in Estonia and during the peak of its production used 25% of the total volume of natural gas in Estonia.

== Gallery ==
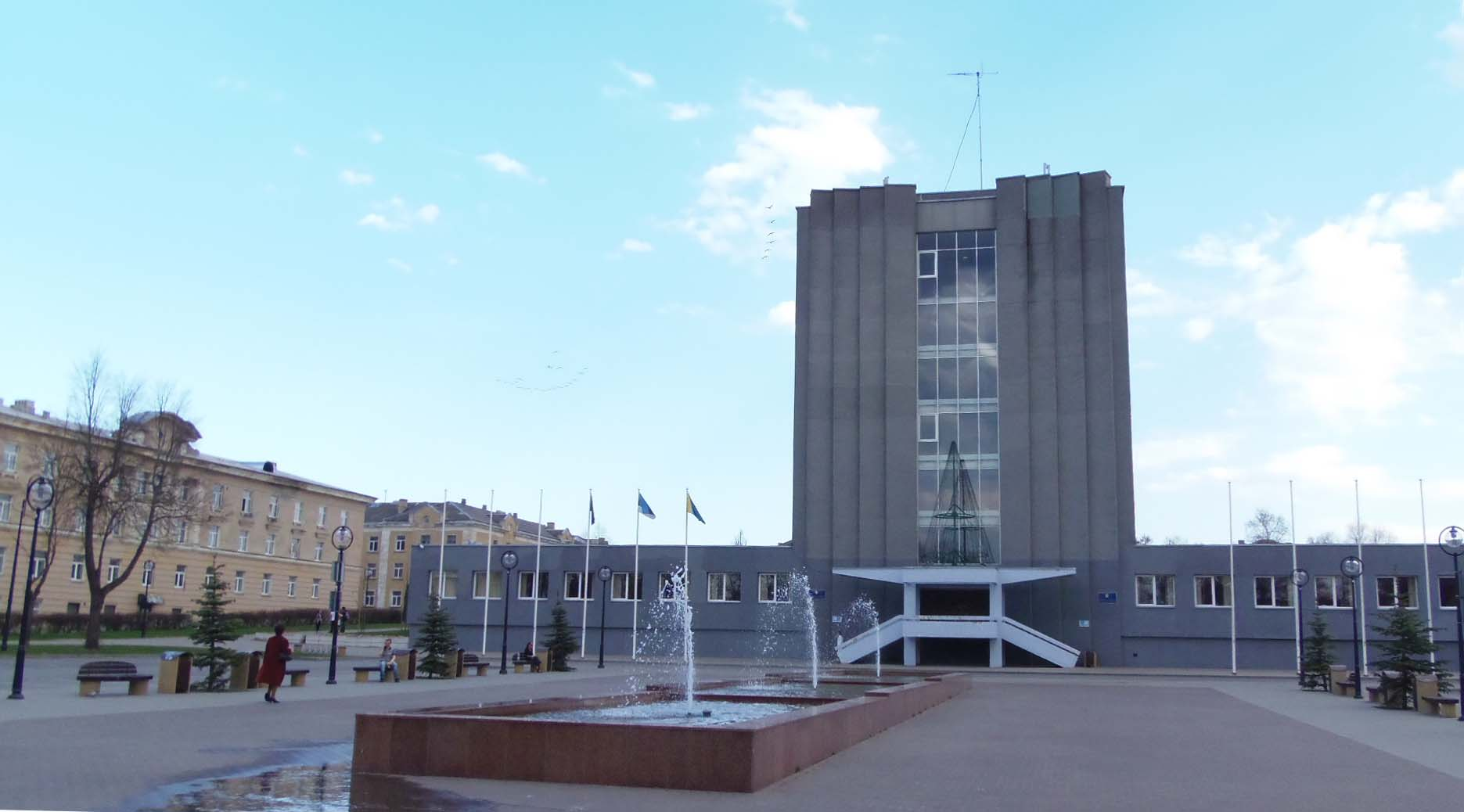
Kohtla-Järve city administration building

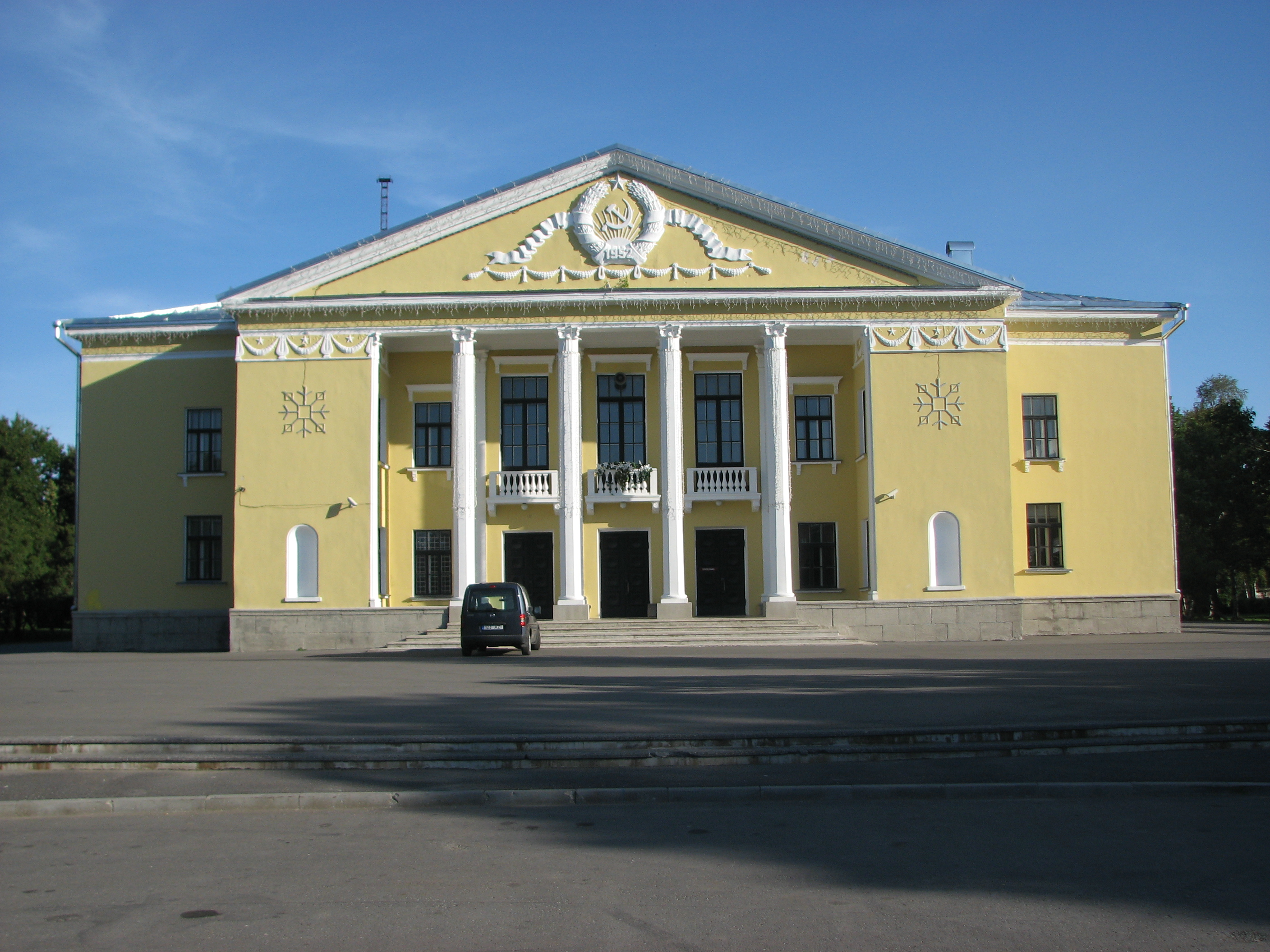
Community centre in Kohtla-Järve

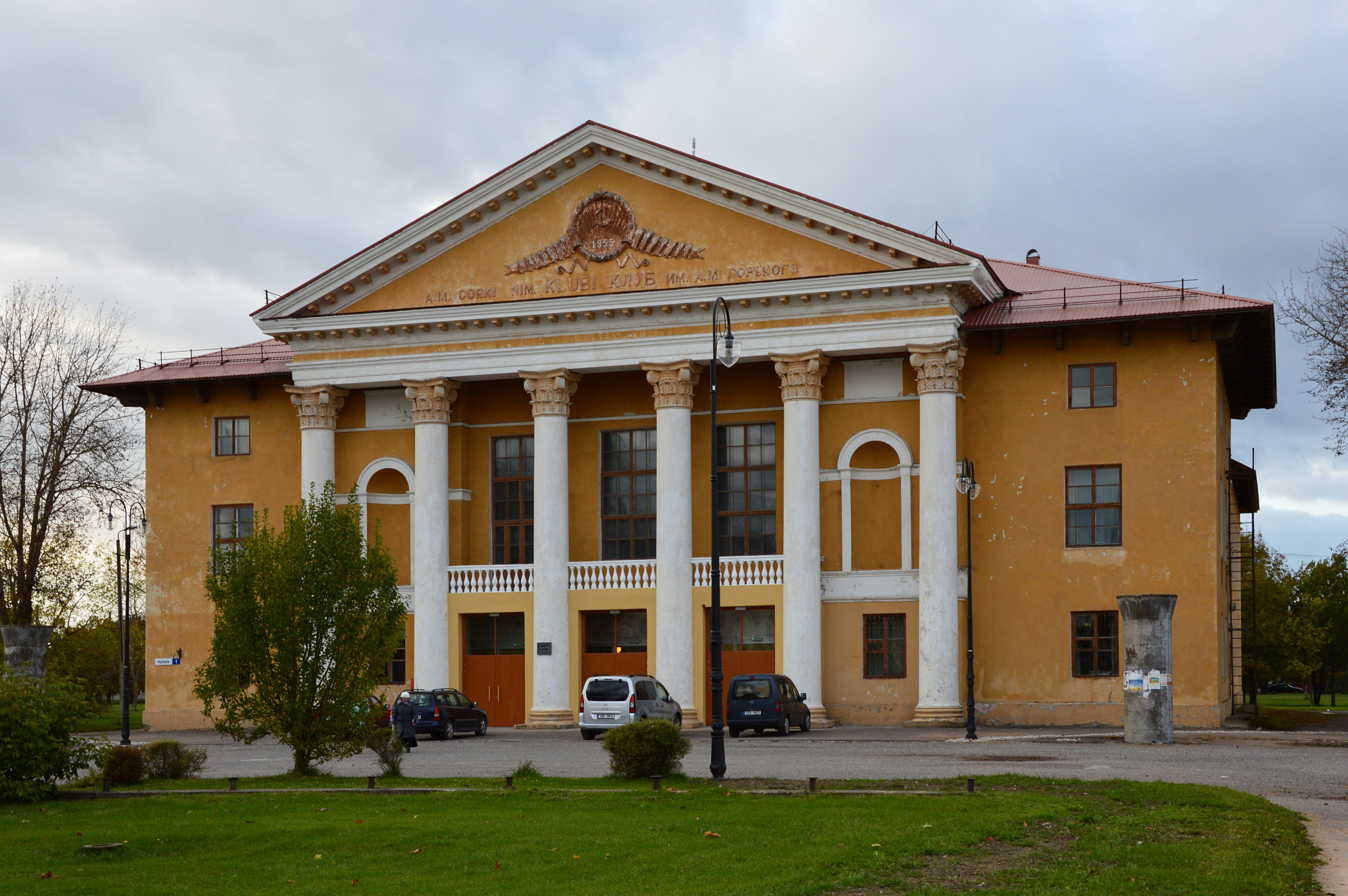
Sompa district, community centre in the middle.

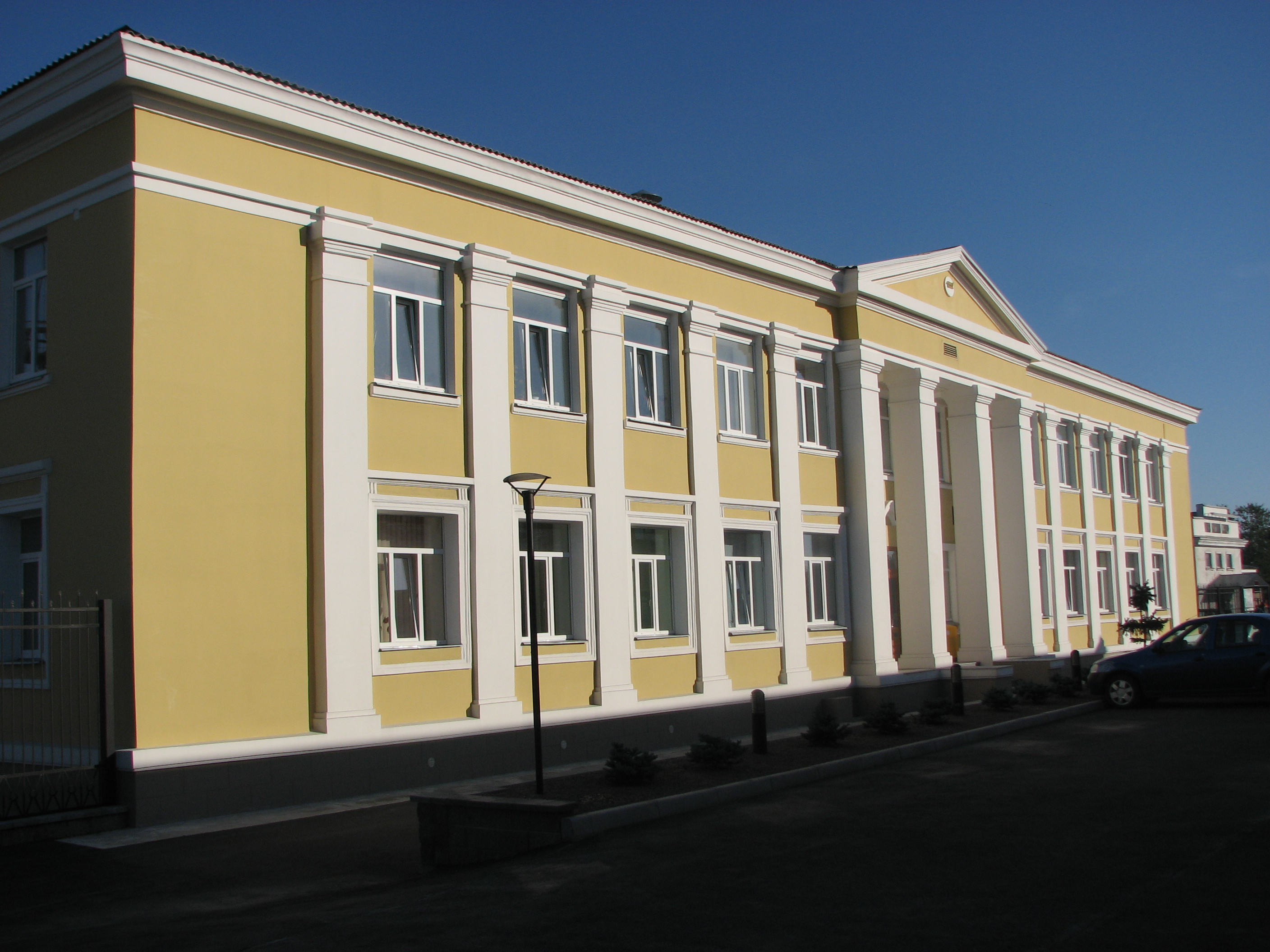
Administrative building of Viru Keemia Grupp

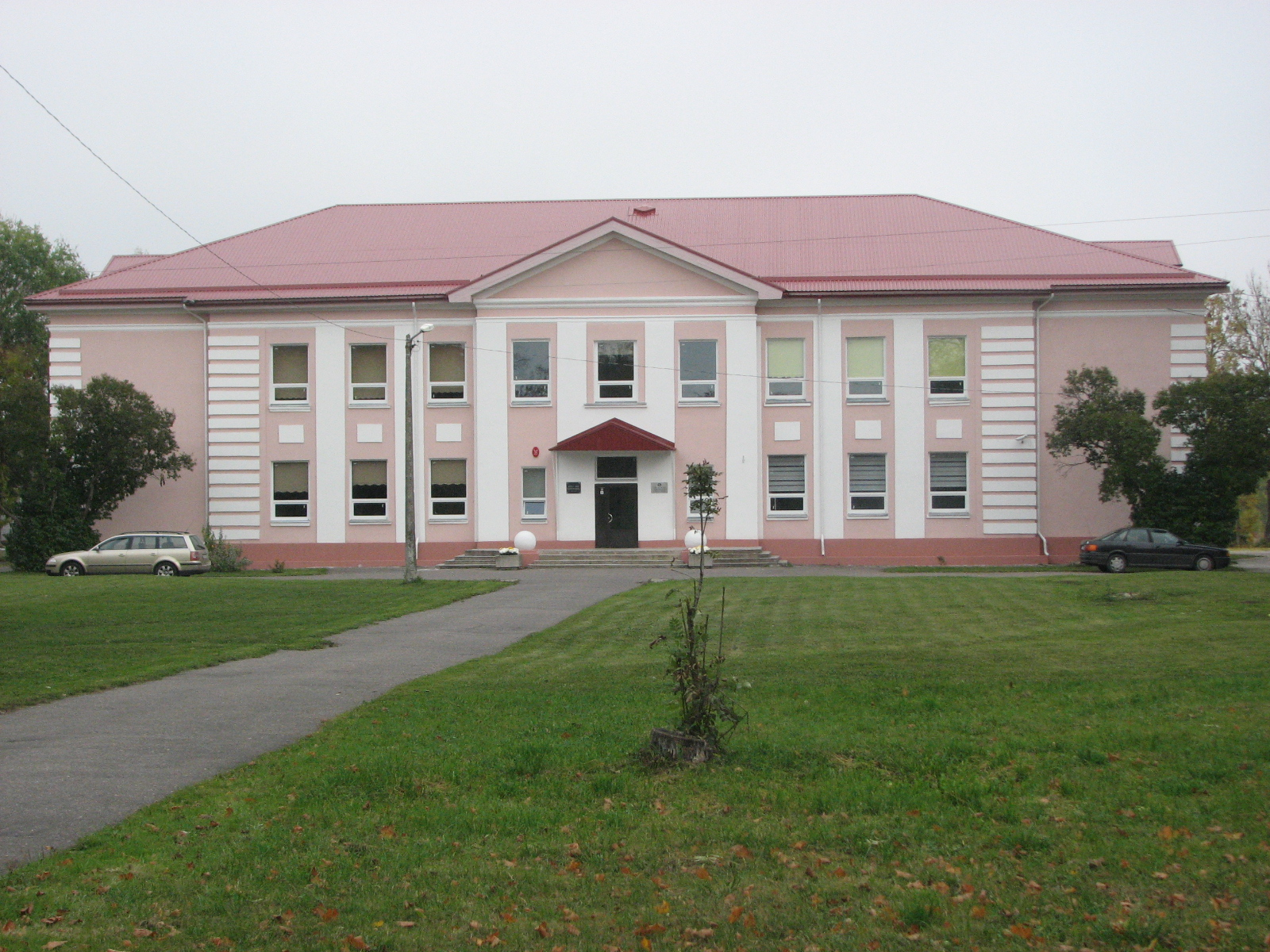
Kohtla-Järve branch of the Tallinn Health Care College

== Twin towns – sister cities ==
Kohtla-Järve is twinned with:

- Kėdainiai, Lithuania
- Kingiseppsky District, Russia
- Korostyshiv, Ukraine
- Norderstedt, Germany
- Outokumpu, Finland
- Salihorsk, Belarus
- Slantsevsky District, Russia
- Staffanstorp, Sweden
- Veliky Novgorod, Russia
- Wyszków, Poland

== See also ==
- Ahtme Power Plant
- Kohtla-Järve Power Plant
- Viru Keemia Grupp
