= Jõhvi =

Town in Estonia

- Town
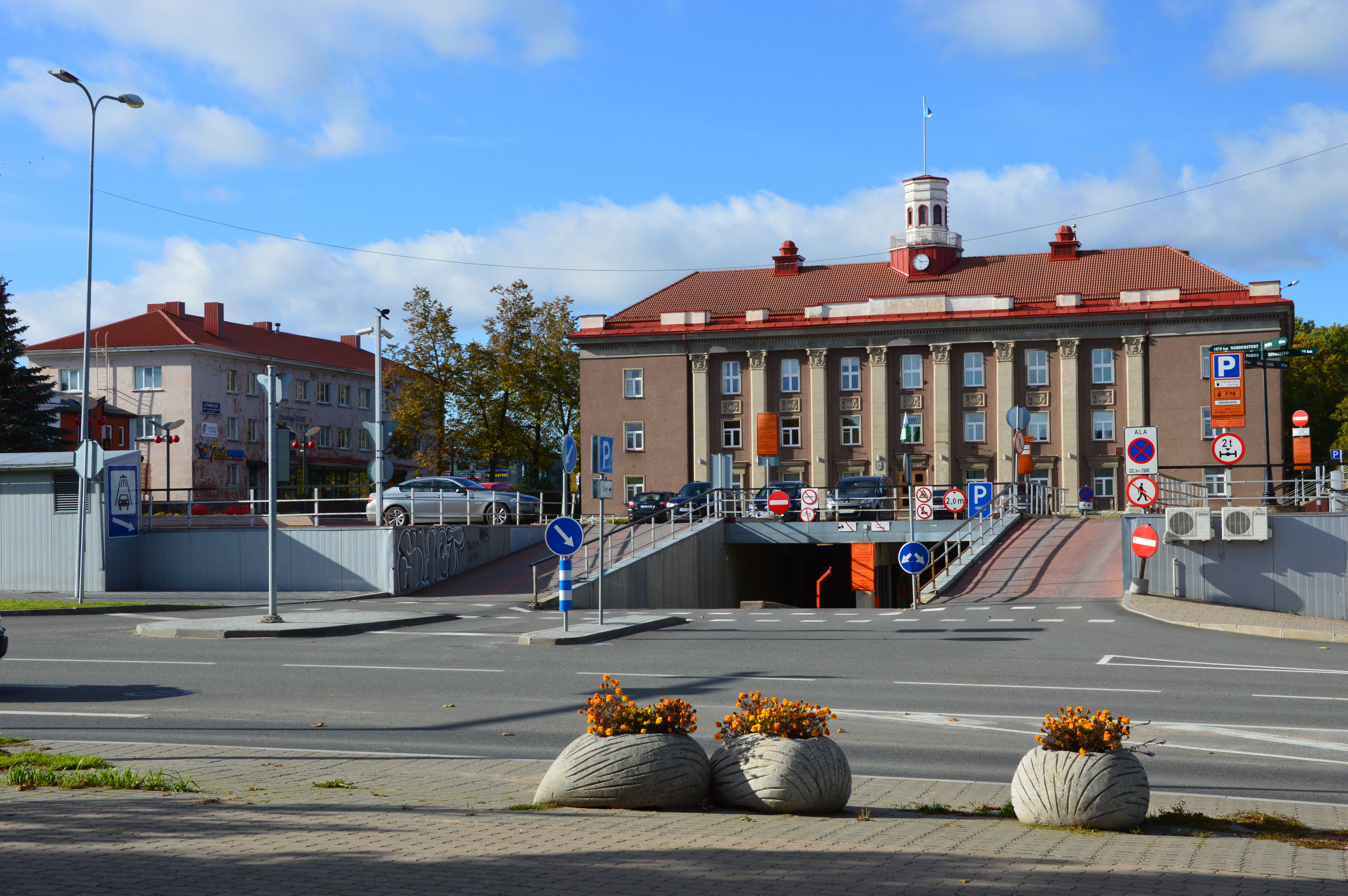
- Jõhvi central square

- Location in Estonia
- Coordinates: 59°21′27″N 27°25′37″E
- Country: Estonia
- County: Ida-Viru County
- Municipality: Jõhvi Parish
- First historical record: 1241
- Town rights: 1 May 1938

Area
  - Total: 7.62 km^{2} (2.94 sq mi)

Population (01.01.2024)
  - Total: 10,880
  - Rank: 13th
  - Density: 1,430/km^{2} (3,700/sq mi)

Ethnicity (2021)
  - Estonians: 34.7%
  - Russians: 55.3%
  - other: 10%
- Time zone: UTC+2 (EET)
  - Summer (DST): UTC+3 (EEST)
- Postal code: 41501-41599

Jõhvi (/ˈjoʊvi/ YOH-vee; Estonian: [ˈjɤhʋi]; German: Jewe) is a town in northeastern Estonia, and the administrative seat of Ida-Viru County and Jõhvi Parish. The town is located about 50 km west of the Estonia–Russia international border.

== History ==
Jõhvi was first mentioned as a village in 1241 in Liber Census Daniae when it was ruled by Denmark. Historical names of Jõhvi were Gewi and Jewe. In the 13th century a church was built there, and Jõhvi became the centre of the local church parish.

On 1 May 1938, the government of Estonia upgraded the official status of Jõhvi from a borough to that of an independent town. From 1960 to 1991, Jõhvi was administratively not a town, but a district of the city of Kohtla-Järve. In 2005, the town of Jõhvi was united with the parish of Jõhvi.

== Demographics ==
During the period when Estonia was occupied by the Soviet Union, a significant influx of workers from other parts of the Soviet Union was initiated to support the expanding city of Kohtla-Järve, including the then district of Jõhvi. This influx resulted in Estonians becoming a minority in the area.

Ethnic composition 1922-1959, 2000-2021
| Ethnicity | 1922 | | 1934 | | 1941 | | 1959 | | 2000 | | 2011 | | 2021 | |
| Ethnicity | amount | % | amount | % | amount | % | amount | % | amount | % | amount | % | amount | % |
|---|---|---|---|---|---|---|---|---|---|---|---|---|---|---|
| Estonians | 1472 | 90.9 | 1874 | 91.7 | 1822 | 89.8 | 3838 | 36.5 | 4022 | 33.2 | 3718 | 34.5 | 3635 | 34.7 |
| Russians | 106 | 6.54 | 124 | 6.07 | 85 | 4.19 | - | - | 6482 | 53.5 | 6004 | 55.7 | 5797 | 55.3 |
| Ukrainians | - | - | 1 | 0.05 | - | - | - | - | 395 | 3.26 | 289 | 2.68 | 285 | 2.72 |
| Belarusians | - | - | - | - | - | - | - | - | 543 | 4.48 | 344 | 3.19 | 279 | 2.66 |
| Finns | - | - | 2 | 0.10 | 104 | 5.13 | - | - | 240 | 1.98 | 135 | 1.25 | 118 | 1.13 |
| Jews | 4 | 0.25 | 8 | 0.39 | 0 | 0.00 | - | - | 23 | 0.19 | 17 | 0.16 | 13 | 0.12 |
| Latvians | - | - | 4 | 0.20 | 4 | 0.20 | - | - | 39 | 0.32 | 21 | 0.19 | 32 | 0.31 |
| Germans | 15 | 0.93 | 14 | 0.69 | - | - | - | - | 34 | 0.28 | 16 | 0.15 | 24 | 0.23 |
| Tatars | - | - | 8 | 0.39 | - | - | - | - | 29 | 0.24 | 30 | 0.28 | 34 | 0.32 |
| Poles | - | - | 2 | 0.10 | 0 | 0.00 | - | - | 51 | 0.42 | 33 | 0.31 | 32 | 0.31 |
| Lithuanians | - | - | 0 | 0.00 | 1 | 0.05 | - | - | 39 | 0.32 | 27 | 0.25 | 28 | 0.27 |
| unknown | 1 | 0.06 | 2 | 0.10 | 3 | 0.15 | 0 | 0.00 | 122 | 1.01 | 17 | 0.16 | 39 | 0.37 |
| other | 22 | 1.36 | 4 | 0.20 | 9 | 0.44 | 6664 | 63.5 | 93 | 0.77 | 124 | 1.15 | 166 | 1.58 |
| Total | 1620 | 100 | 2043 | 100 | 2028 | 100 | 10502 | 100 | 12112 | 100 | 10775 | 100 | 10482 | 100 |

== Climate ==
Climate data for Jõhvi (normals 1991–2020, extremes 1926–present)
| Month | Jan | Feb | Mar | Apr | May | Jun | Jul | Aug | Sep | Oct | Nov | Dec | Year |
|---|---|---|---|---|---|---|---|---|---|---|---|---|---|
| Record high °C (°F) | 8.9 (48.0) | 10.6 (51.1) | 17.2 (63.0) | 26.6 (79.9) | 32.1 (89.8) | 33.1 (91.6) | 33.7 (92.7) | 34.6 (94.3) | 28.1 (82.6) | 19.7 (67.5) | 13.6 (56.5) | 10.9 (51.6) | 34.6 (94.3) |
| Mean daily maximum °C (°F) | −2.3 (27.9) | −2.4 (27.7) | 1.9 (35.4) | 9.5 (49.1) | 15.8 (60.4) | 19.6 (67.3) | 22.4 (72.3) | 21.0 (69.8) | 15.7 (60.3) | 8.5 (47.3) | 2.7 (36.9) | −0.5 (31.1) | 9.3 (48.7) |
| Daily mean °C (°F) | −4.6 (23.7) | −5.2 (22.6) | −1.7 (28.9) | 4.5 (40.1) | 10.3 (50.5) | 14.6 (58.3) | 17.4 (63.3) | 15.9 (60.6) | 11.2 (52.2) | 5.5 (41.9) | 0.6 (33.1) | −2.5 (27.5) | 5.5 (41.9) |
| Mean daily minimum °C (°F) | −7.5 (18.5) | −8.5 (16.7) | −5.5 (22.1) | −0.1 (31.8) | 4.3 (39.7) | 9.1 (48.4) | 11.9 (53.4) | 10.9 (51.6) | 7.0 (44.6) | 2.4 (36.3) | −1.7 (28.9) | −5 (23) | 1.4 (34.5) |
| Record low °C (°F) | −34.5 (−30.1) | −36 (−33) | −28.4 (−19.1) | −18 (0) | −6.5 (20.3) | −2.5 (27.5) | 1.7 (35.1) | −0.6 (30.9) | −4.2 (24.4) | −15.7 (3.7) | −25.9 (−14.6) | −41 (−42) | −41 (−42) |
| Average precipitation mm (inches) | 45 (1.8) | 34 (1.3) | 36 (1.4) | 34 (1.3) | 50 (2.0) | 84 (3.3) | 77 (3.0) | 93 (3.7) | 67 (2.6) | 84 (3.3) | 64 (2.5) | 49 (1.9) | 717 (28.2) |
| Average precipitation days (≥ 1.0 mm) | 12.8 | 9.3 | 9.0 | 8.2 | 7.8 | 11.2 | 9.8 | 11.5 | 10.6 | 14.3 | 13.2 | 13.2 | 130.9 |
| Average relative humidity (%) | 90 | 88 | 80 | 72 | 68 | 73 | 76 | 80 | 84 | 87 | 90 | 91 | 82 |
Source 1: Estonian Weather Service
Source 2: NOAA/NCEI (precipitation day, 1991-2020)

== In cinematography ==
In 2024, a teaser for the Estonian-American film Juvenile Inspektor: The Shadow Over Jõhvi was filmed in the city, which included the actors Oleksiy Gorbunov, Alexander Ivashkevich, Ella Bardot, and Maksim Pokrovsky. The producer and director of the film was Pavel Gavrilin.

== Gallery ==
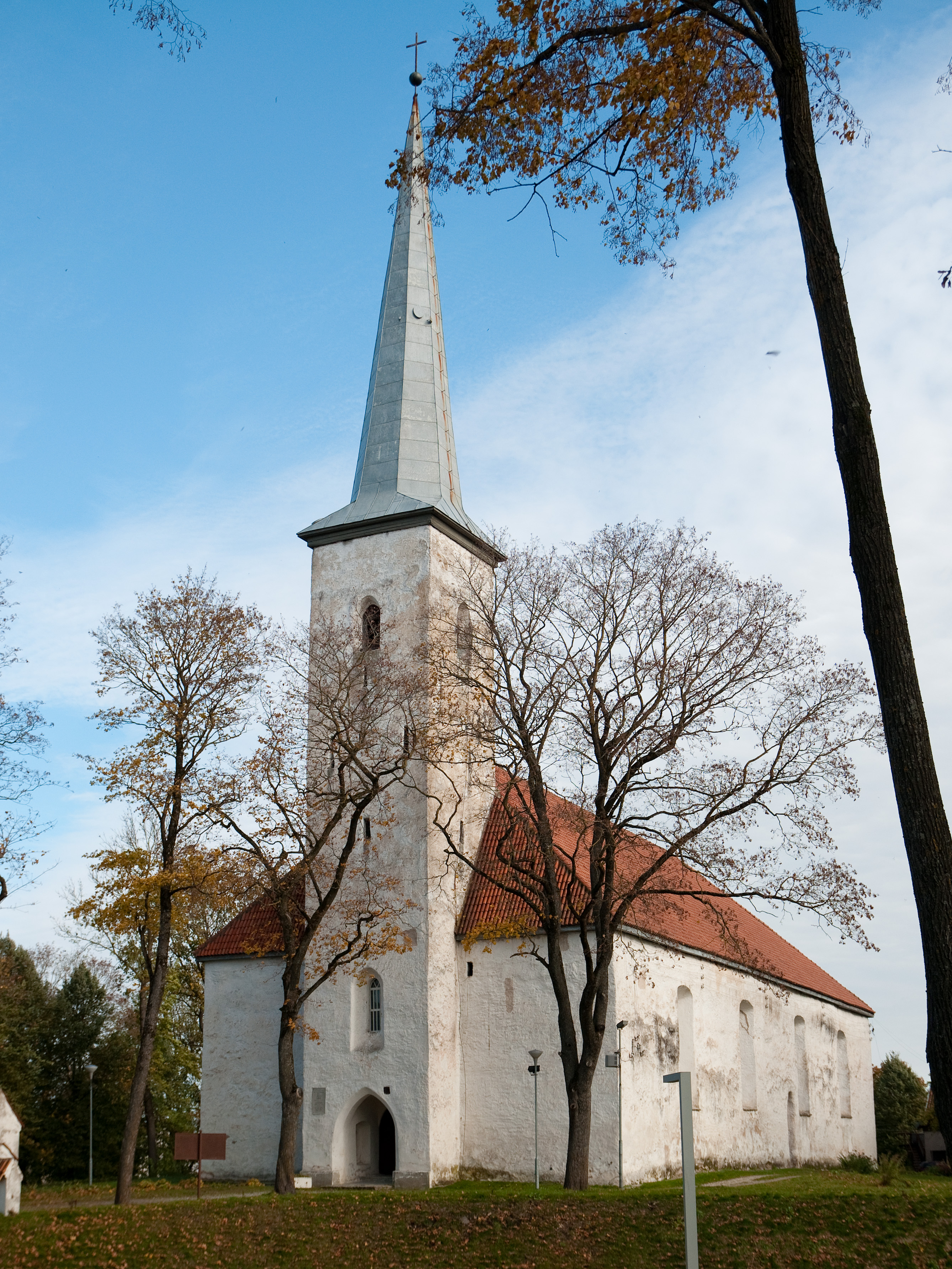
Jõhvi church

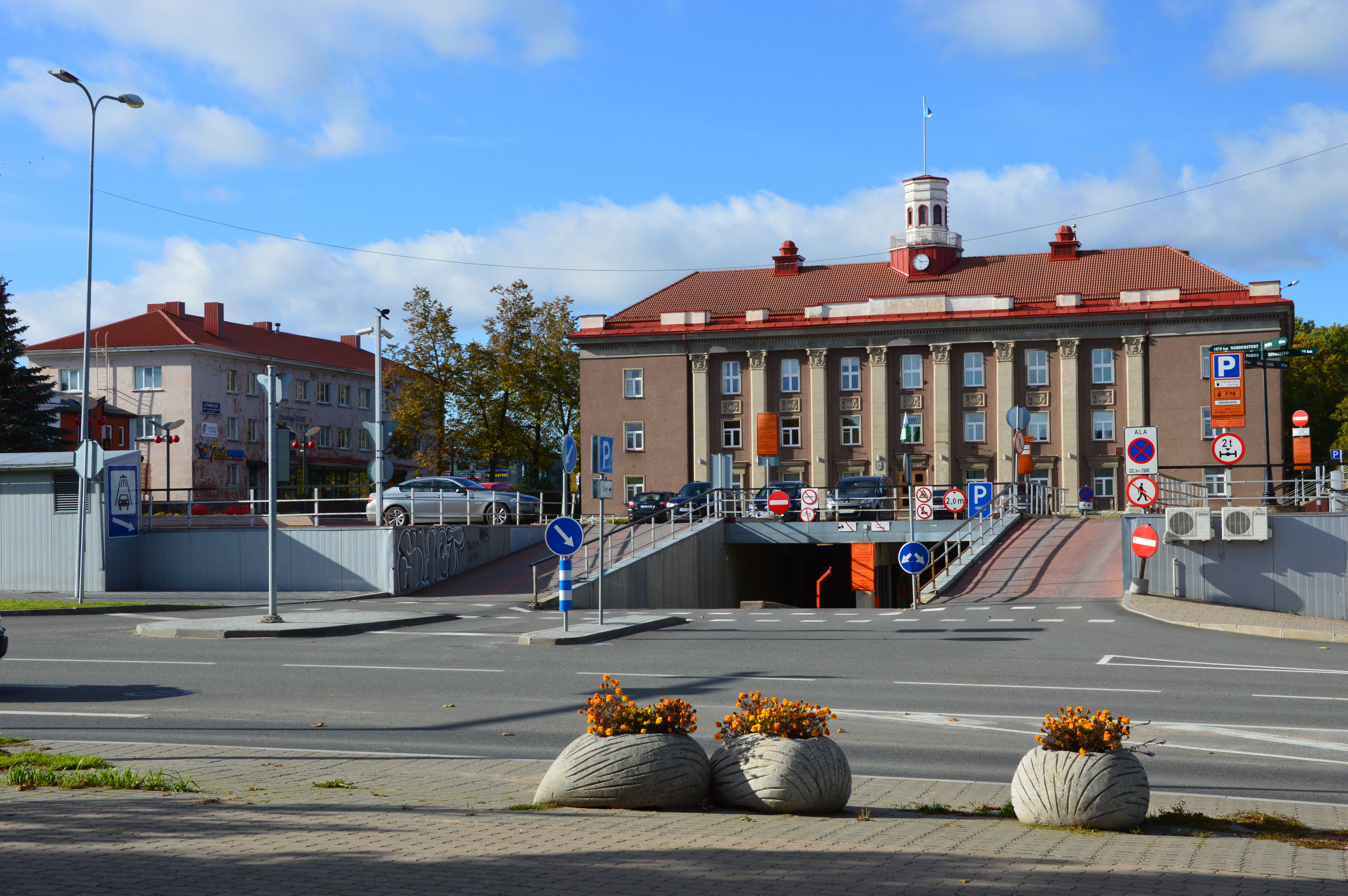
Central square

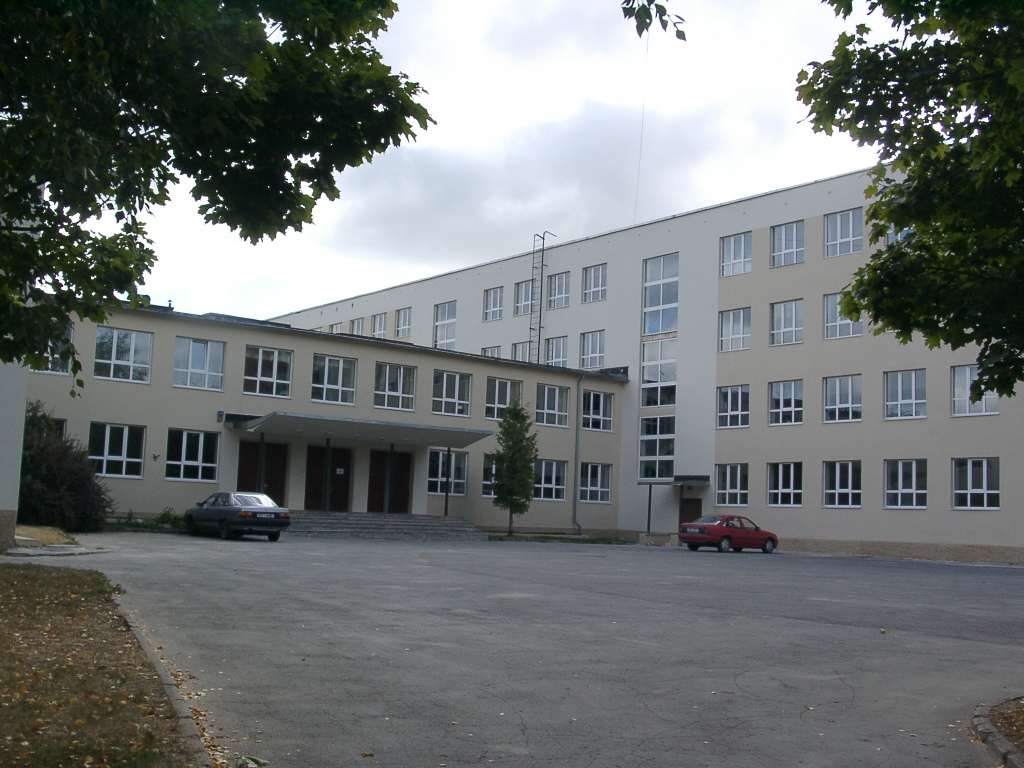
Jõhvi Gymnasium

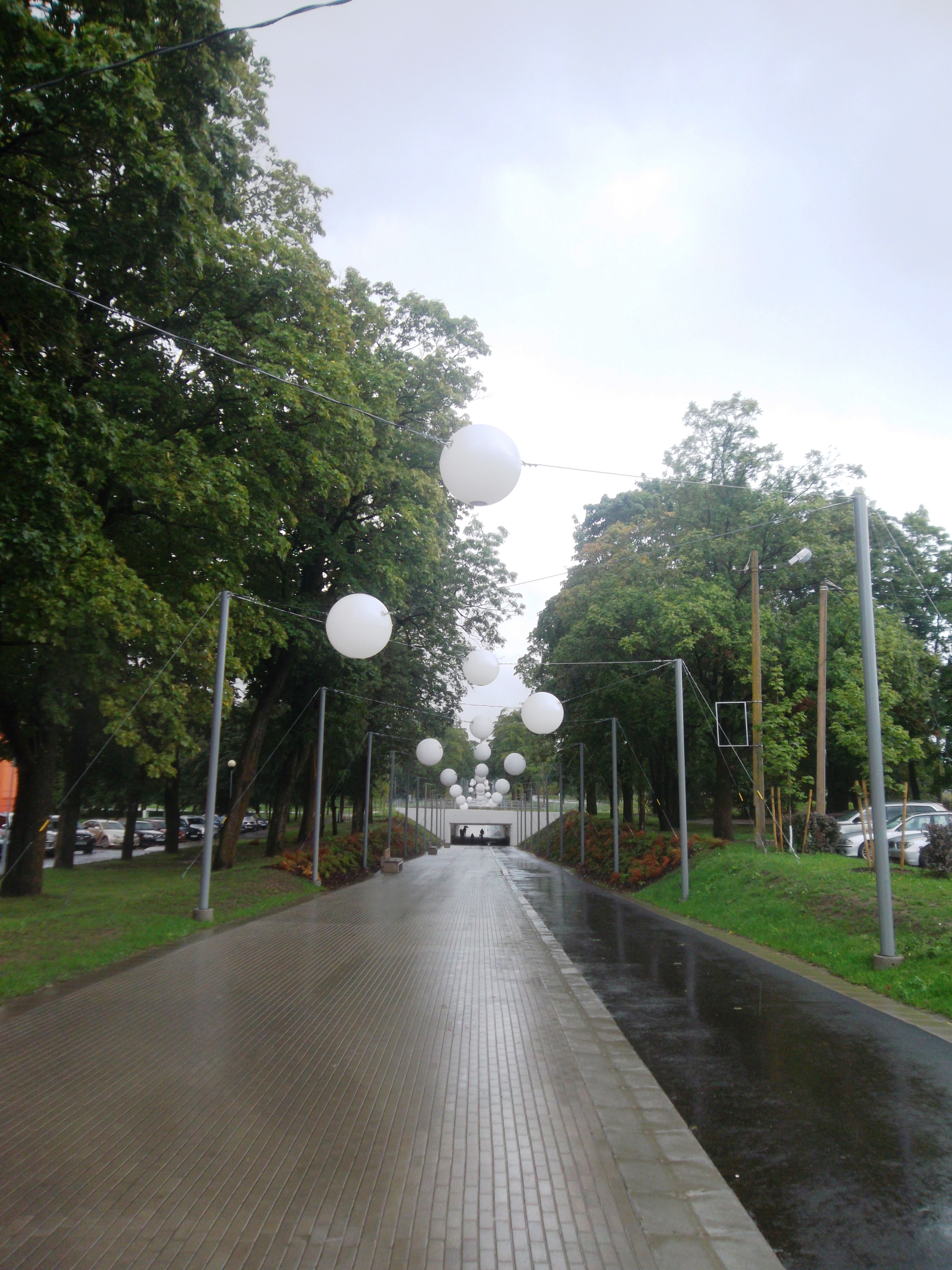
Jõhvi promenade

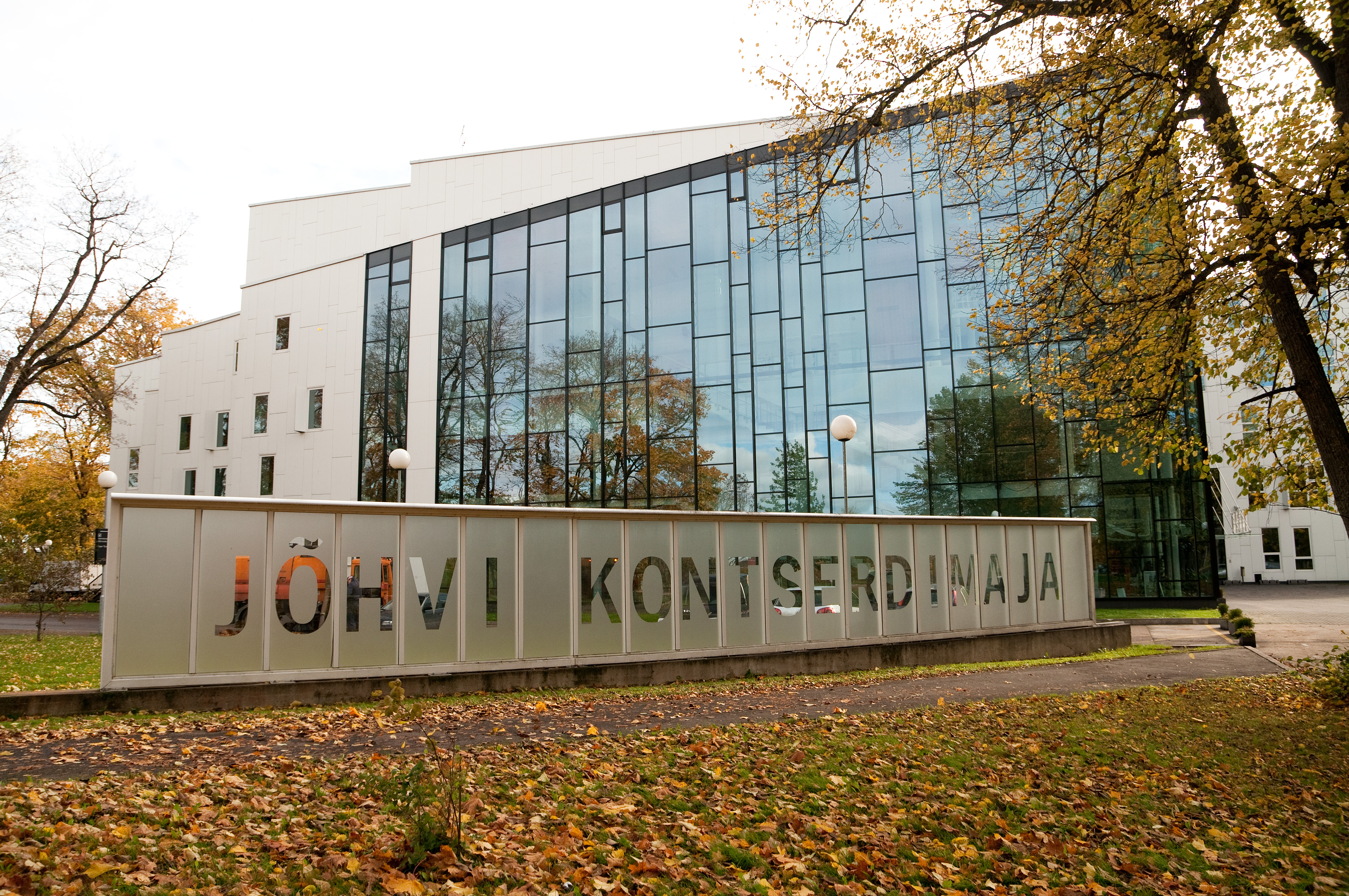
Jõhvi Concert Hall

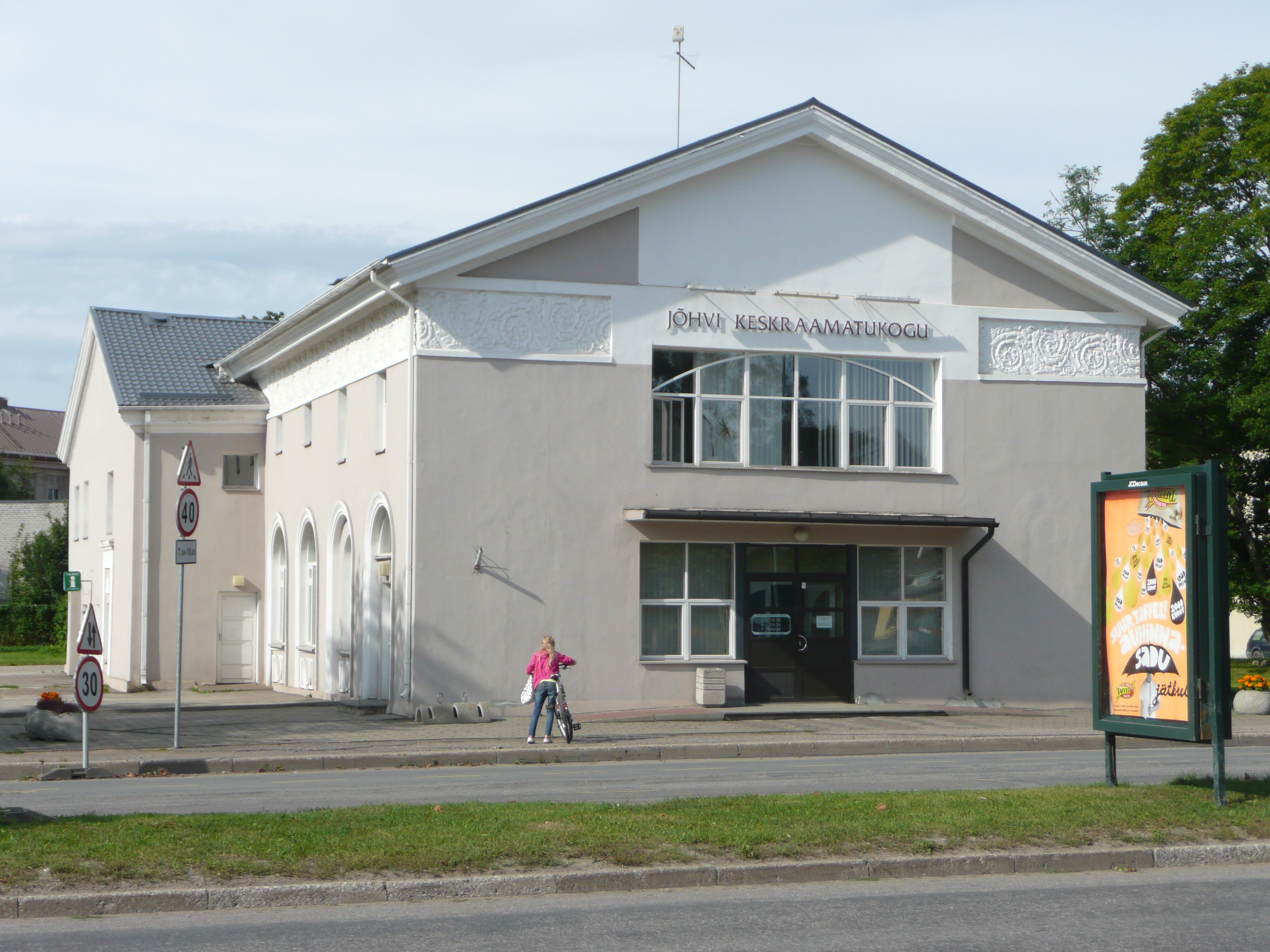
Jõhvi Central Library

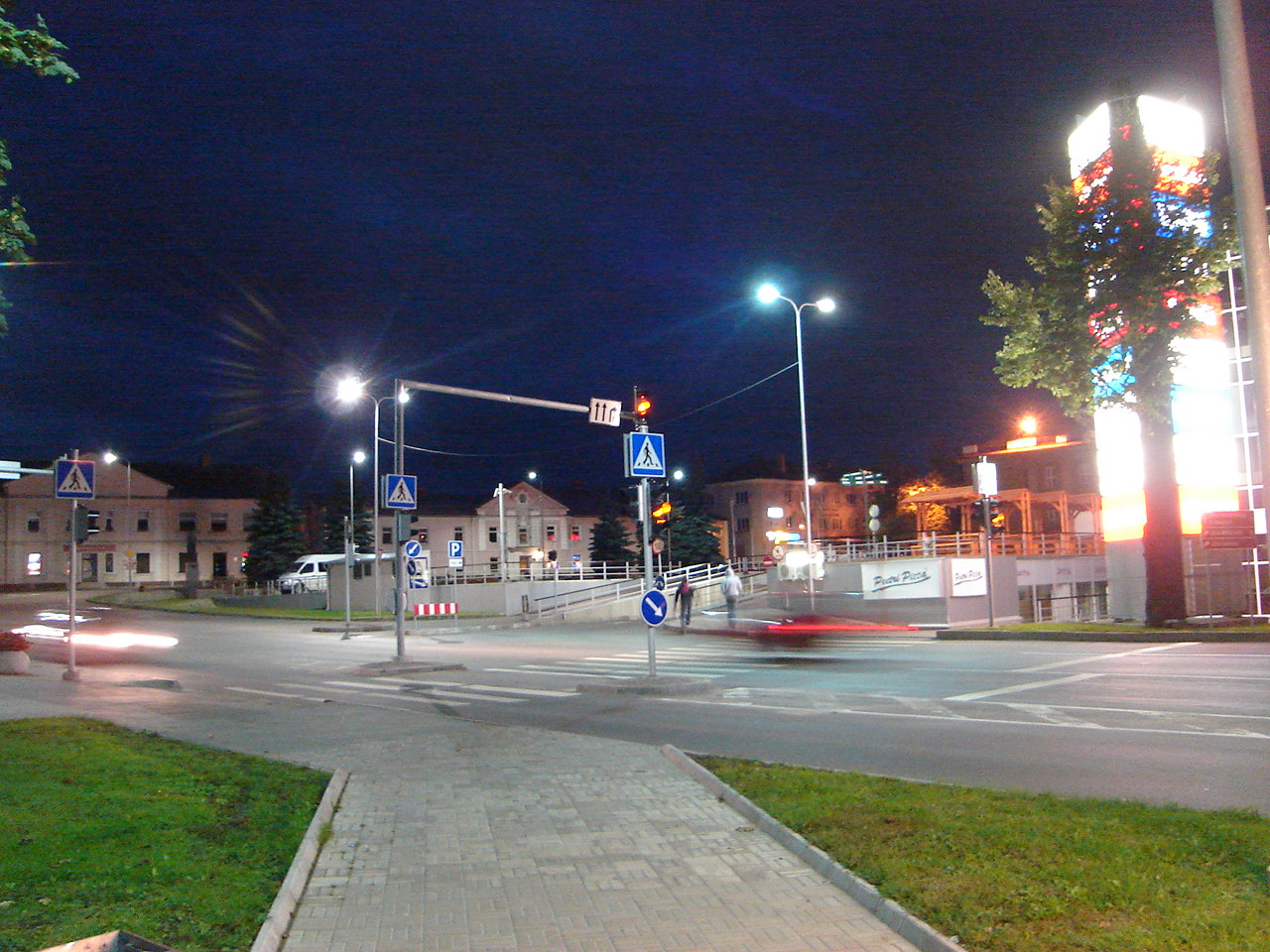
Jõhvi at night

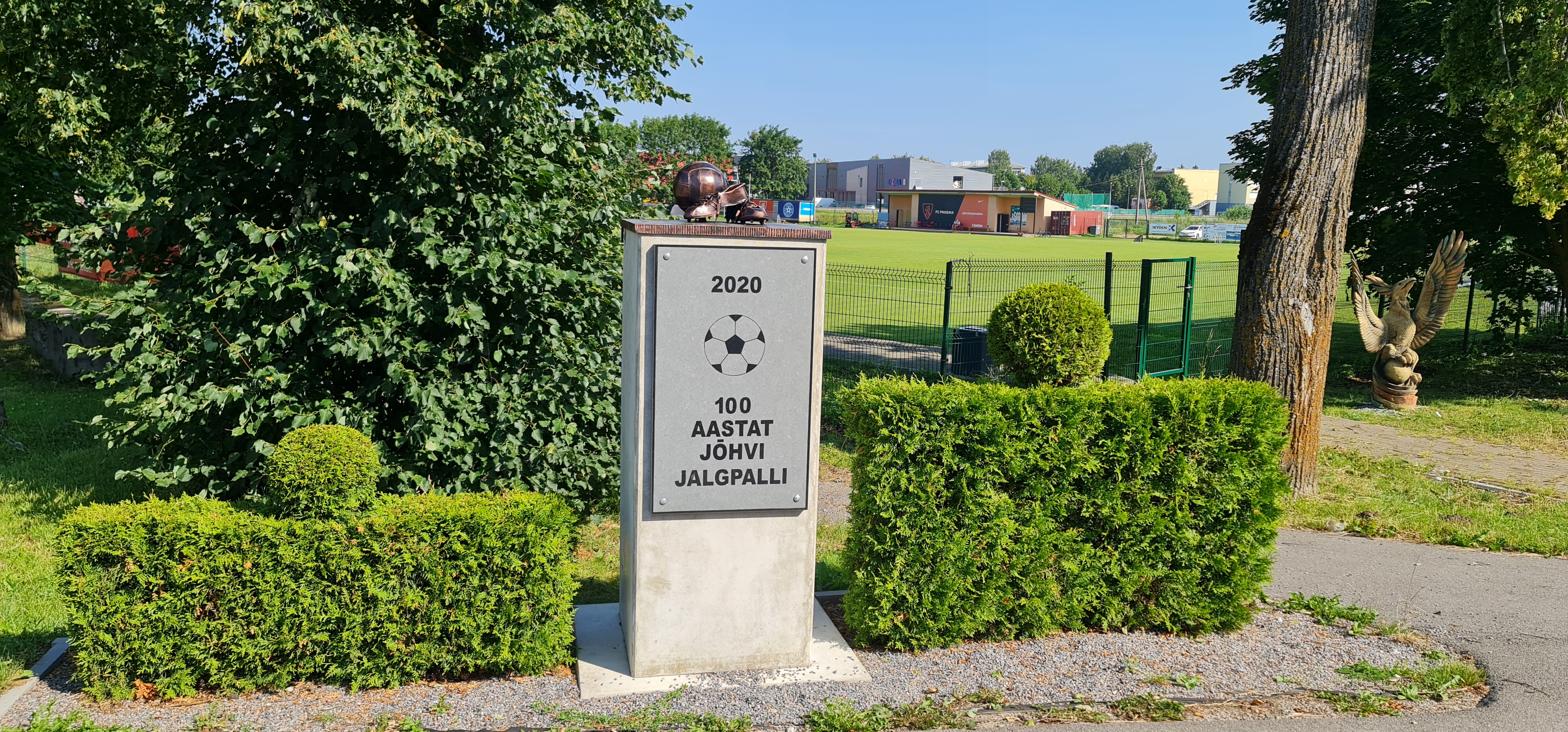
Monument to 100 years of football in Jõhvi

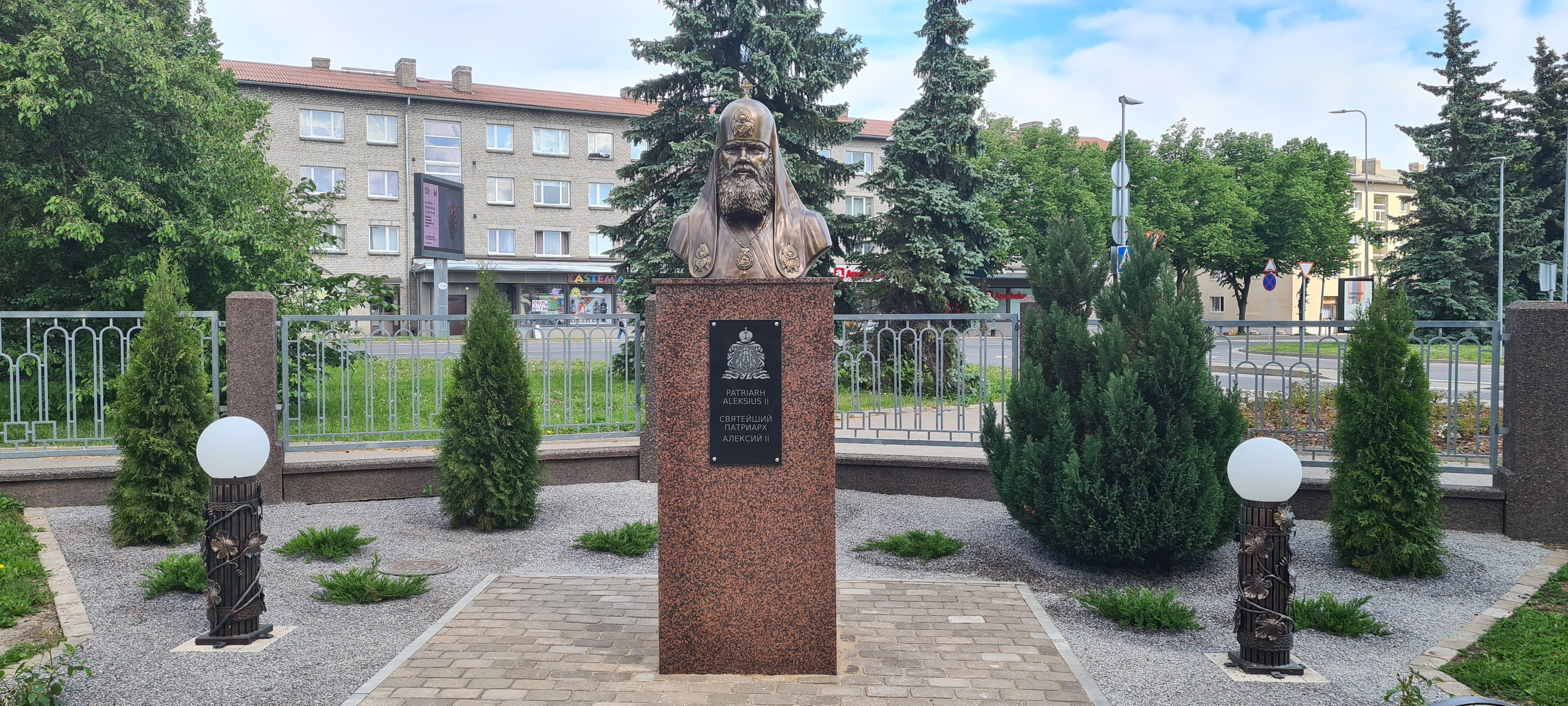
Monument to Aleksius II

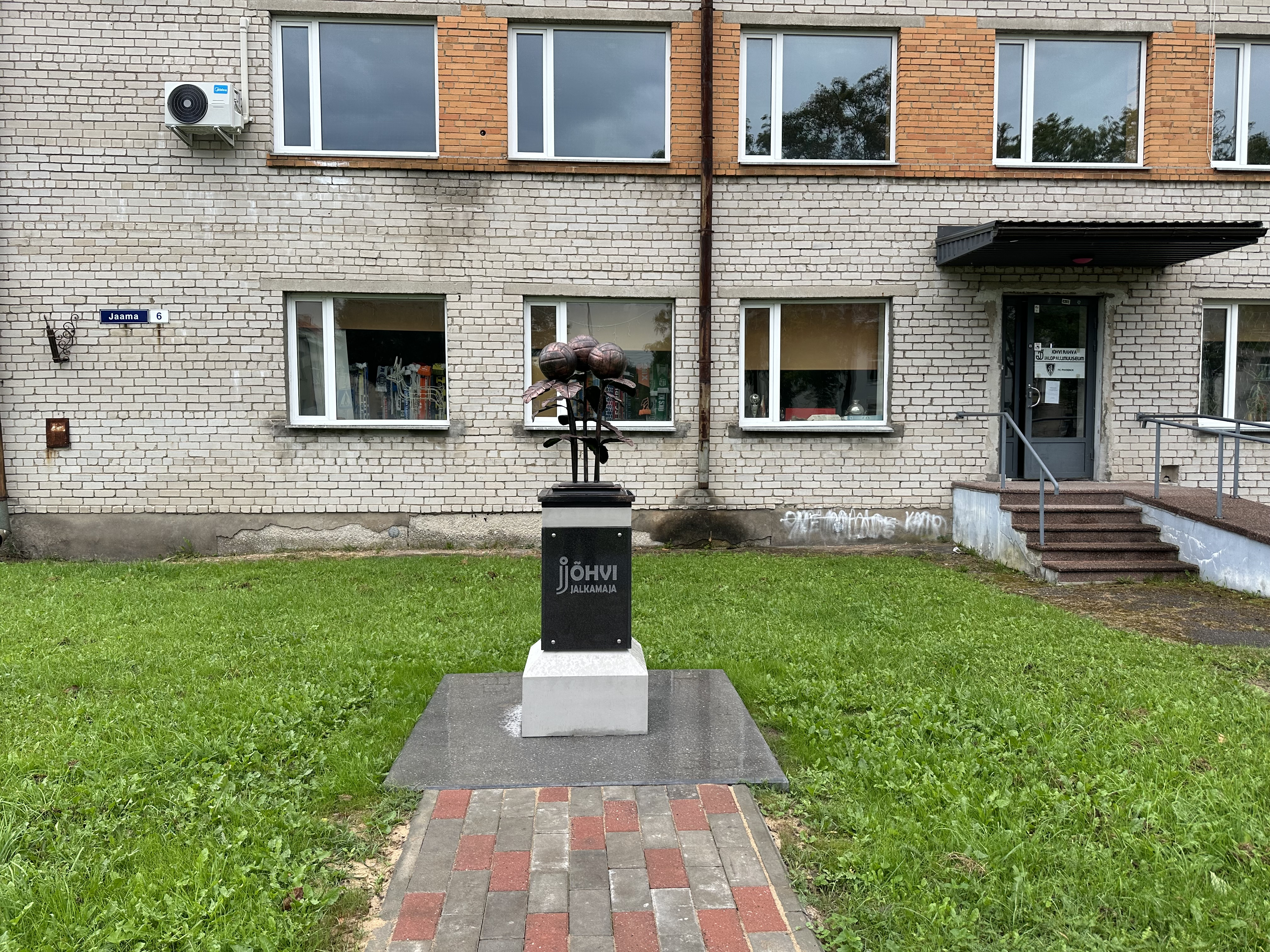
Jõhvi football museum
