= Autun oil shale deposit =

Sedimentary basin in Autun, France

Location of the deposit on the map of France.

The Autun oil shale deposit is a sedimentary basin containing oil shale of the Autunian age (between 299 and 282 million years old) in the vicinity of Autun in Saône-et-Loire, in the center-east of France.

The extraction of the shale commenced in 1824 at Igornay. Oil shale production began as early as 1837 for public lighting purposes, with facilities undergoing continuous improvement to diversify production. The largest of these facilities was the Télots mine, which was equipped with a refinery in 1936 and employed several hundred workers to produce automobile fuel. This mine was the last to close in 1957. The total production of the deposit is estimated at 13 million tons.

The vestiges of this industrial activity, in the form of ruins and slag heaps, persist in the early 21st century, particularly in the villages of Dracy-Saint-Loup, Saint-Forgeot, and Tavernay.

== Location ==
Map of Saône-et-Loire communes, showing the extent of the deposit in black and the Télots mine in red.

The deposit is situated in a valley in the Morvan, spanning the territories of the communes of Autun, Dracy-Saint-Loup, Igornay, Saint-Forgeot, Tavernay, and other neighboring communes in the north of the Saône-et-Loire department, in the Bourgogne-Franche-Comté region in the Grand Est of France.

The sedimentary basin is an underground depression with an east-west orientation, measuring approximately 30 km in length and reaching a maximum width of 12 km.

The Autun basin is in direct proximity to the Épinac coal basin. The two deposits have a significant degree of overlap and are even jointly exploited in the communes of Sully and Saint-Léger-du-Bois.

== Geology ==
The Autun oil shale deposit has lent its name to the geological period during which it was formed, the Autunian, which spans between −299 and −282 million years ago. The deposit measures 1.3 km in thickness and has never been fully traversed. The deepest shaft, La Brasserie, reaches a depth of 463 meters. The oil shale layers are interspersed with fine detrital sediments, including limestone. The layers form lenses whose thickness and quality vary greatly. The deposit is based on the Stephanian coal foundation of Épinac.

The basin is divided into two stratigraphic units, which are subdivided into two beds:

- Lower Autunian:
  - The Igornay bed is situated directly on the Moloy (Saint-Léger-du-Bois) coal terrain. It has a thickness ranging from 150 to 230 meters, comprising alternating layers of bituminous and non-bituminous coal, overlain by a substantial sandstone layer.
  - The Muse bed is 400 meters in thickness and includes bituminous layers, namely the Laly and Muse layers.
- Upper Autunian:
  - The Surmoulin bed (Dracy-Saint-Loup) has a thickness of 250 meters and comprises, in its lower portion, the extensive Surmoulin oil shale layer.
  - The Millery bed (Saint-Forgeot) is 250 meters in length and consists of shale intermingled with detrital rock. It contains ten layers of bitumen, which have been significantly mined at the Télots mine. The upper layer is composed of boghead, a type of bituminous coal.

== History ==
The deposit was initially identified in 1813 at Igornay, and extraction commenced in 1824 within this commune. The industrial production of oil shale began in 1837 for public lighting in several major cities, including Paris, Lyon, Dijon, and Strasbourg. (Note: "Les Houillères de Blanzy en Bourgogne : Mine de schiste bitumineux des Télots – Autun / Saint-Forgeot". patrimoine-minier.fr (in French). Archived from the original on 3 January 2022.) To extract the oil, the shale is crushed and then heated to a temperature between 450 and 500 °C in a confined, airless space. The escaping vapor is then condensed to obtain a liquid material similar to petroleum. (Note: "Les Houillères de Blanzy : Mine des Télots". exxplore.fr (in French). Archived from the original on 26 November 2015.) Despite facing competition from coal gas in 1847, the production of Autun lamp oil rebounded quickly. (Note: Miot, Gilles. "L'exploitation de schiste bitumineux dans l'Autunois : La mine et l'usine des Télots" (PDF). Recherches des étudiants (in French). Archived from the original on 19 June 2018.)

1864 and 1865 represented a period of peak profitability for shareholders, with a 30% return on investment. In 1865, approximately 6,700 tons of oil were extracted from oil shales, using approximately twenty extraction sites and sixteen processing plants.

Towards the conclusion of the nineteenth century, shale was extracted at depths reaching 300 meters below the surface. The advent of competition from American and Russian oil in 1870 led to the demise of several concessions. In 1881, the Société Lyonnaise des Schistes Bitumineux (SLSB) purchased several remaining concessions to restart production with new private capital and state aid. This resulted in the company obtaining a monopoly in 1891. Surface installations were progressively completed from 1840 to 1870, particularly for the production of oil, paraffin, sulfates, and ammonia. However, the latter products were abandoned after World War I.

In 1892, the state implemented a reduction in customs duties on imported oils, thereby enhancing their competitive position vis-à-vis Autun oil shale. To offset this, premiums were introduced, enabling the modernization of installations and a 30% increase in crude oil yield. After the 1914 French mobilization, the mines and factories of Ravelon (Dracy-Saint-Loup) and Margenne (Monthelon) were compelled to cease operations. The exploitation of the oil shale deposits was concentrated at the Télots and Surmoulin sites, in the Dracy-Saint-Loup region. In 1933, a legislative measure was enacted that granted tax exemption for fuels derived from oil shale, thereby opening up new avenues for exploration. The implementation of social reforms by the Popular Front in 1936 led to a reduction in the profitability of the SLSB. A new company, the Société Minière des Schistes Bitumineux (SMSB), was established with financial backing from Pechelbronn SAEM. The managers were committed to increasing production sixfold, to extract 3,000 tons of shale per day and distill 5,000 m^{3} of hydrocarbons per month. However, these goals were abandoned after Liberation was unattainable. During Reconstruction, mechanization was employed to maintain production at 300,000 tons of shale extracted per year, with yields superior to those of most coal mines.

The cessation of activity at Télots was prompted by two key factors: the emergence of liquid petroleum as a more lucrative alternative and the termination of state subsidies. These developments led to the dissolution of the SMSB on 11 December 1958.

== Concessions ==
Concessions for the Autun shale deposit. Mining areas Areas mined by the Télots mine Autun conurbation Concession limits Communal boundaries

List of 21 concessions
Name	Surface	Institution
Igornay	522	29 July 1841
Millery	522	11 July 1843
Surmoulin	1068	4 November 1843
Dracy-Saint-Loup	398	4 November 1843
Saint-Léger-du-Bois	515	14 February 1846
Comaille	331	31 August 1845
Petite-Chaume	280	25 July 1855
Poisot	638	17 December 1856
Chambois	1130	27 July 1859
Ruet	810	21 October 1861
Abots	305	8 May 1862
Chevigny	304	25 July 1864
Ravelon	610	1 August 1864
Lally	278	4 December 1864
Saint-Forgeot	364	18 February 1865
Télots	518	22 April 1865
Hauterive	518	20 August 1865
Margenne	243	6 February 1877
Curgy	327	?
Champsigny	113	?
Miens	486	?

=== Concessions of Abots and Dracy-Saint-Loup ===
The two concessions in question engage exclusively in the exploitation of oil shale within the commune of Dracy-Saint-Loup, using the techniques of room and pillar mining. The depth of the underground workings is approximately fifty meters.

At the beginning of the 21st century, the slag heap of the plant and the flooded access trench of the Duverne incline remain in situ.

The Duverne incline

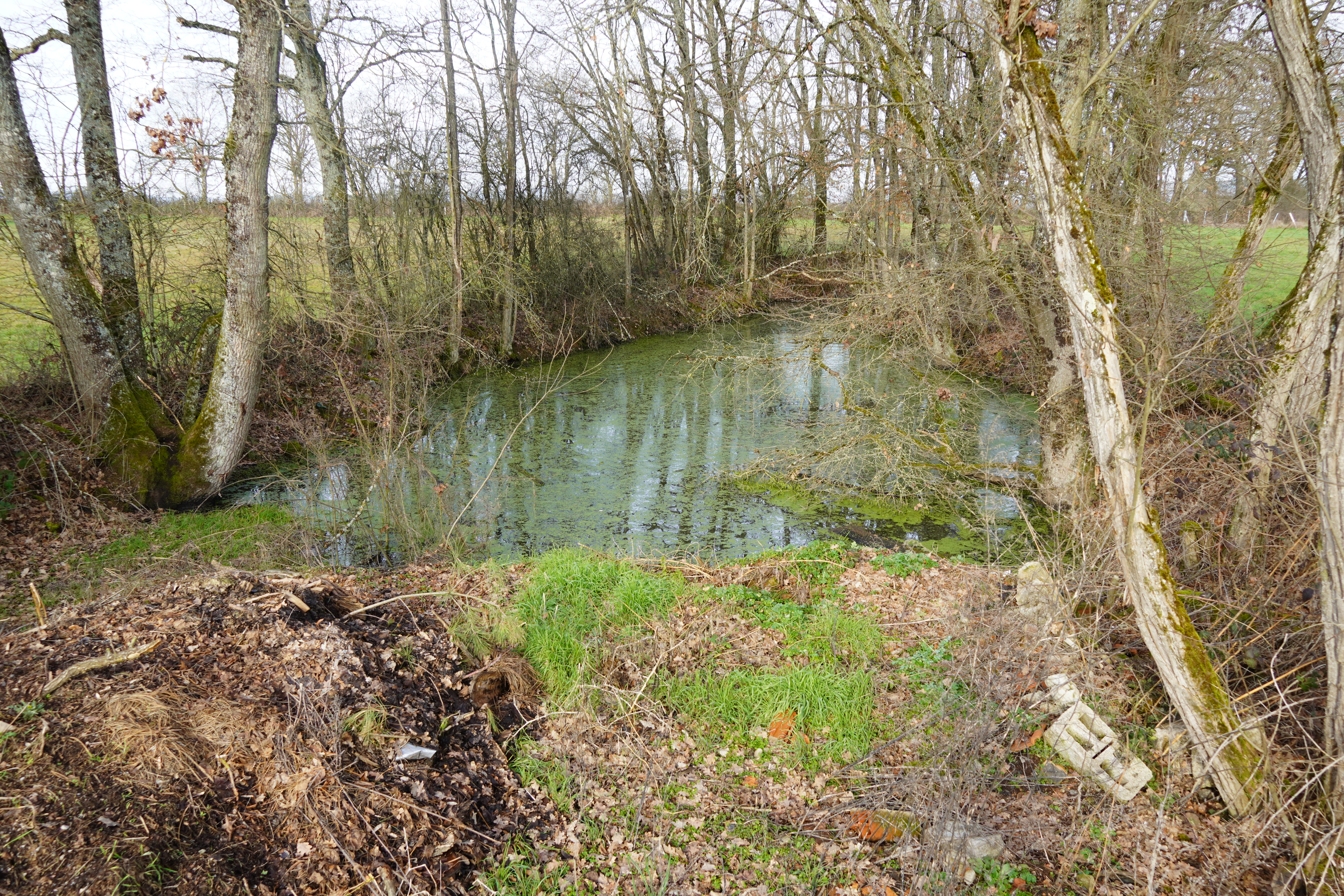
Flooded access trench.

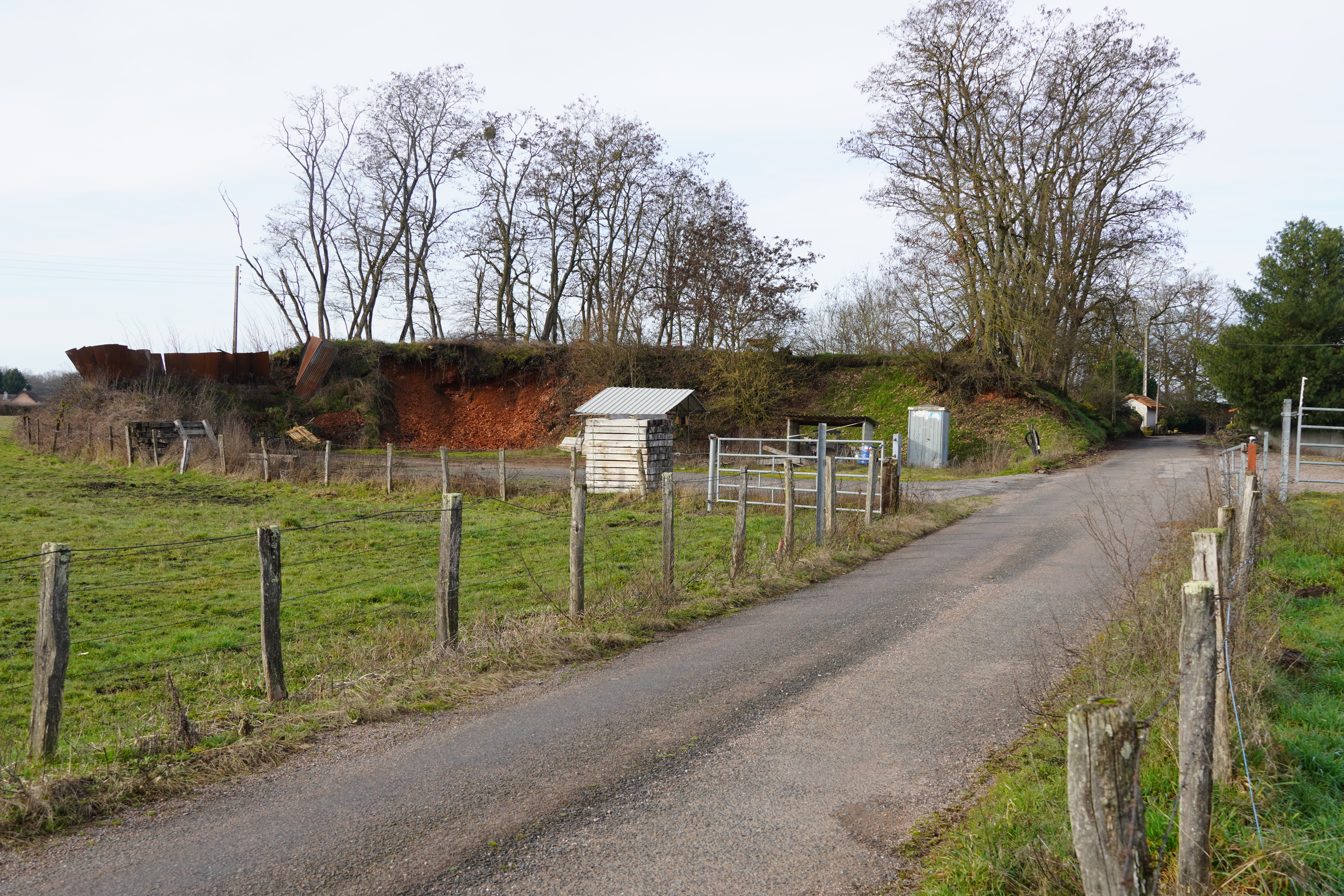
Slag heap.

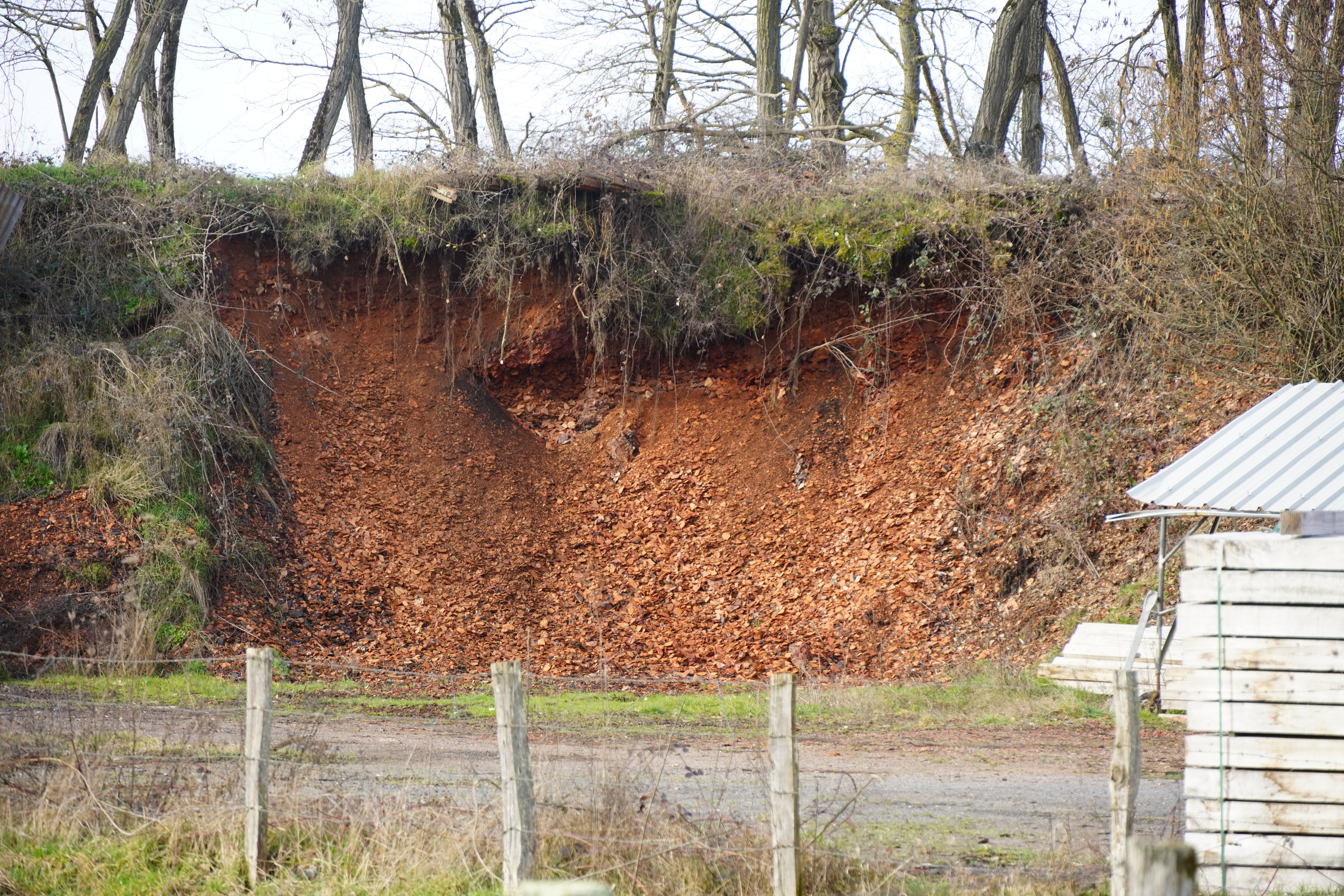
Detail.

=== Cerveau concession ===
This concession is for the exclusive extraction of oil shale in Curgy, using cross-cut galleries. The underground workings do not exceed a depth of 18 meters.

At the beginning of the 21st century, some subsidence was still taking place at mine access.

=== Chambois concession ===
This concession is distinct from the others in that it exclusively mines coal in the commune of Tavernay using room and pillar mining and partial backfilling techniques. The underground workings reach an 82-meter depth, with the coal pits located in Chambois, Saint-Romain (two pits), and Polroy. These pits were exploited in the 19th century.

At the beginning of the 21st century, the site was still characterized by the presence of slag heaps and a sunken pit.

Remains of the Chambois coal mines

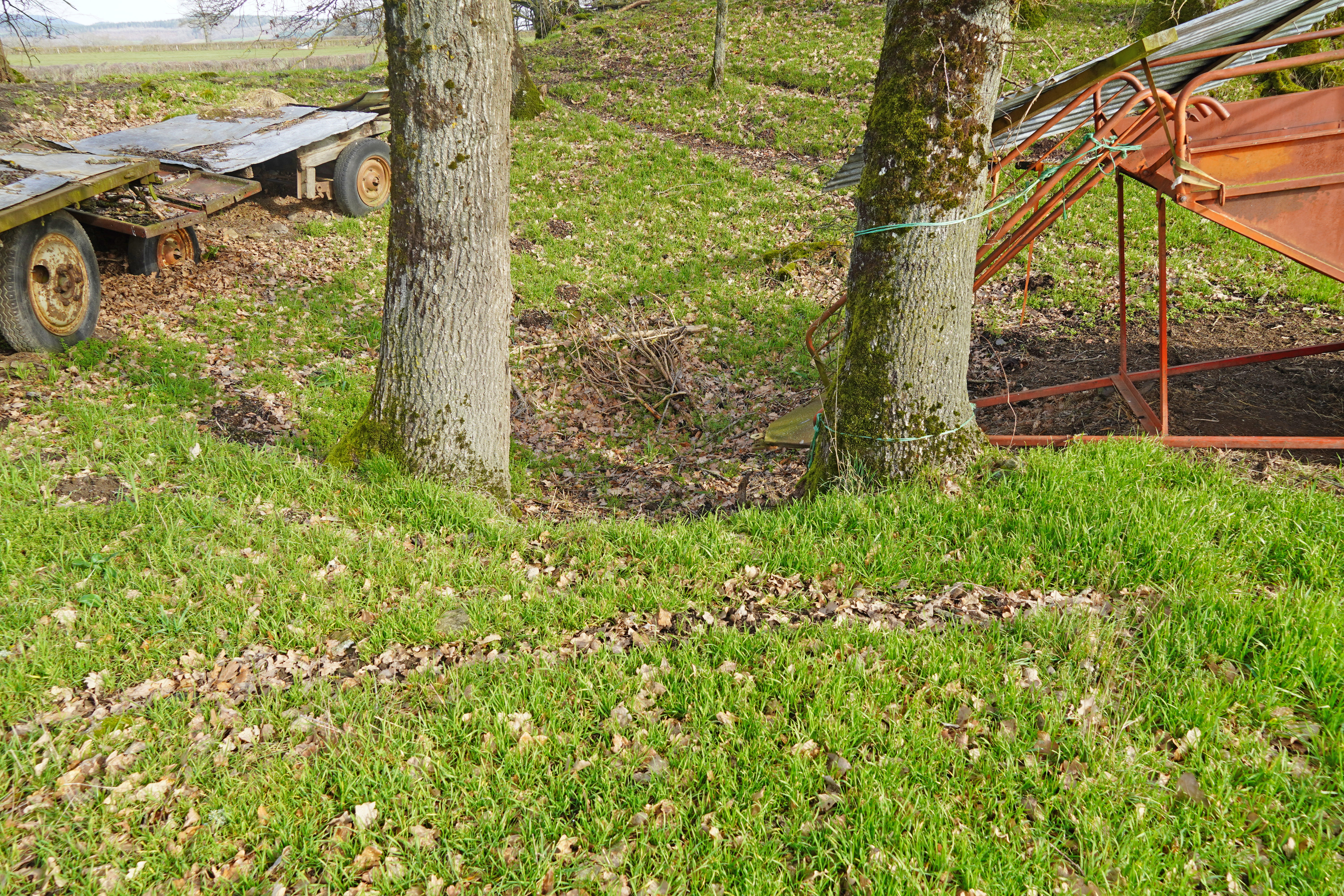
Shaft No. 5 between the two trunks.

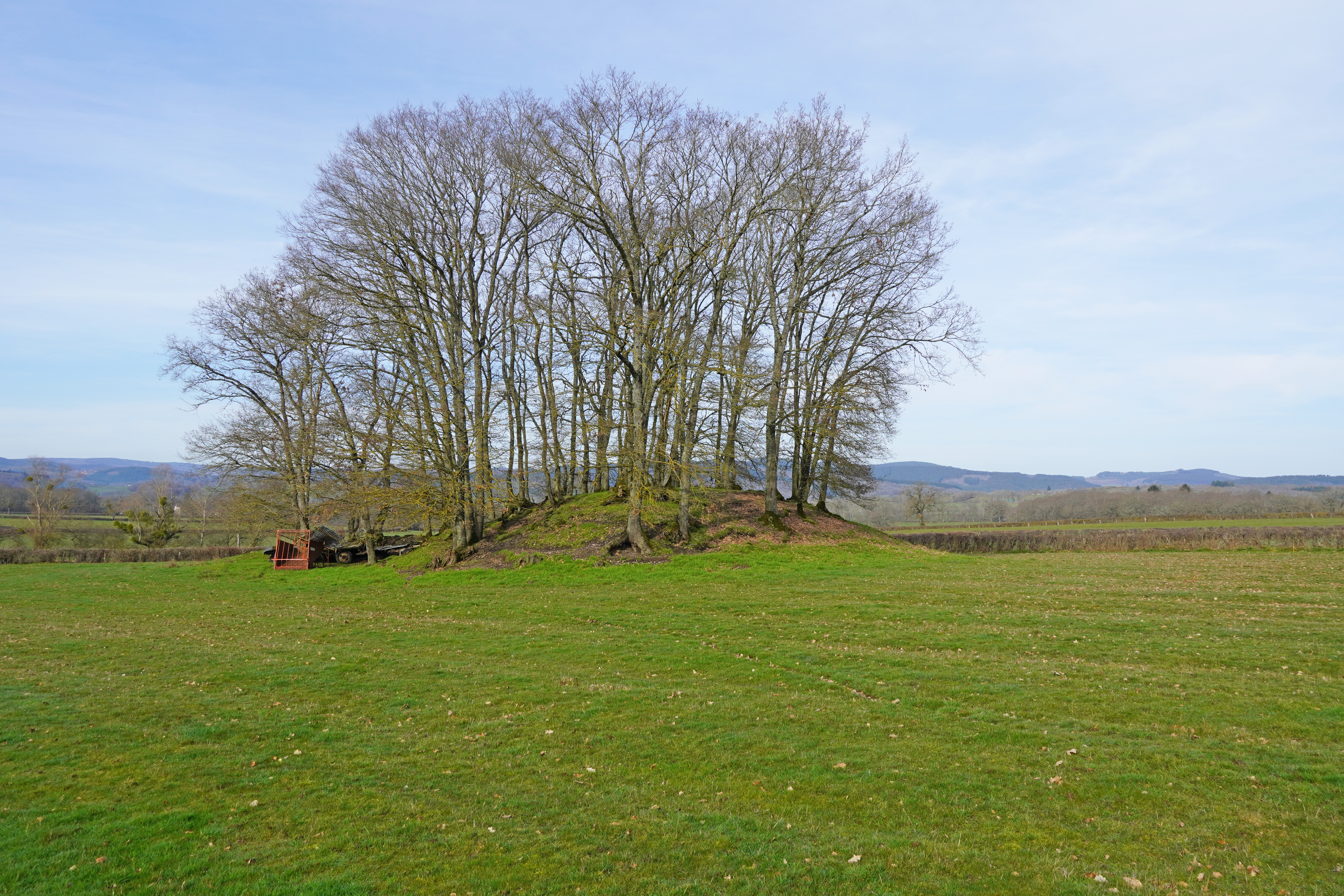
The slag heap at shaft No. 5.

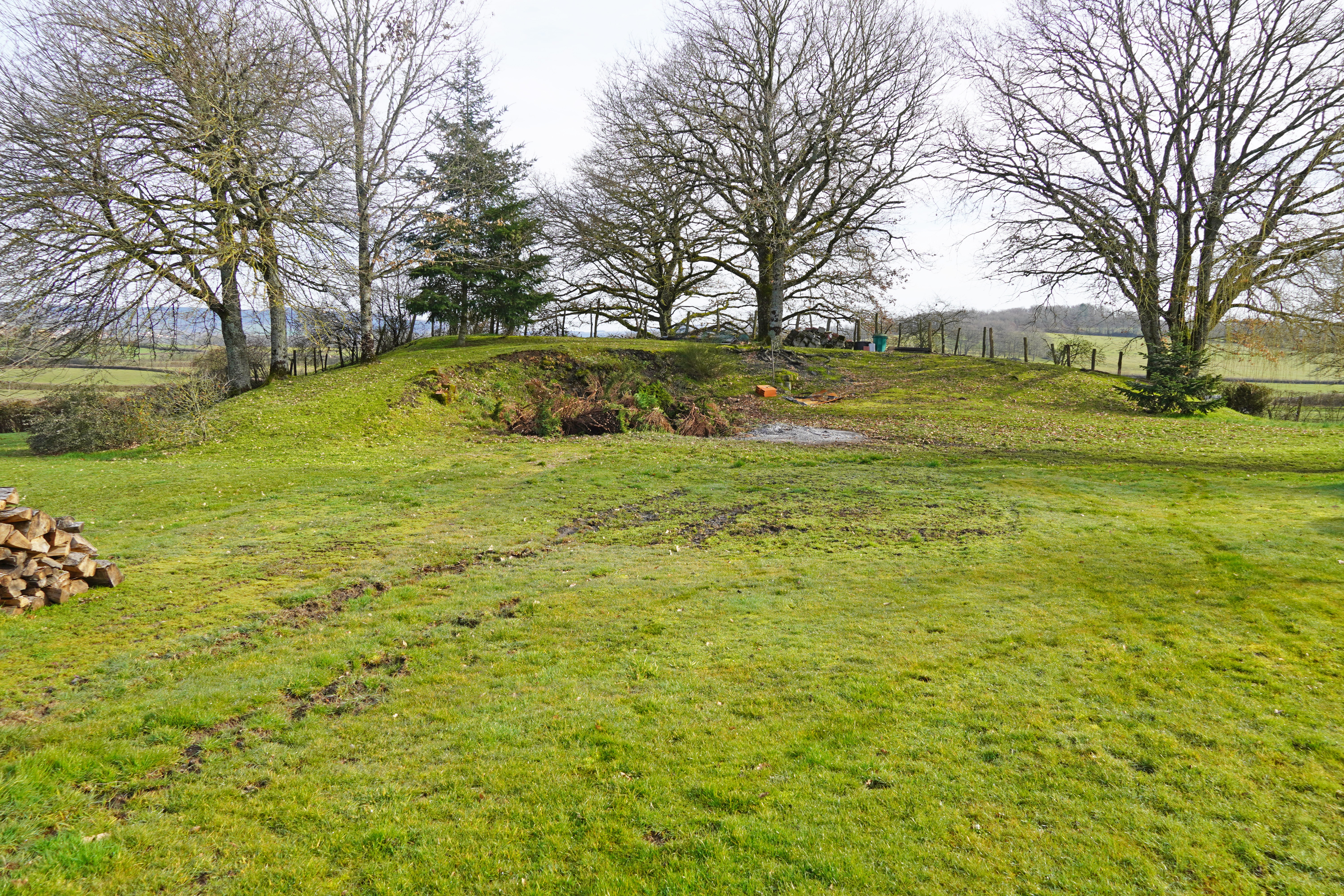
The Saint-Georges slag heap.

=== Millery, Saint-Forgeot, Surmoulin, and Télots concession ===
The concession for the extraction of oil shale was granted in 1865. The extraction is carried out exclusively in the commune of Saint-Forgeot using various methods, including room and pillar mining, longwall mining, and caving. The workings extend to a depth of approximately 100 meters. In 1936, a refinery was constructed to complement the petroleum distillation plant, employing several hundred workers in the production of automotive fuel. During the Occupation, this site was of strategic importance to the German army, which monitored it. In response, the local resistance and the Allies (notably the Scullion raids) conducted minor sabotage acts. In retaliation, five workers were executed by the militia.

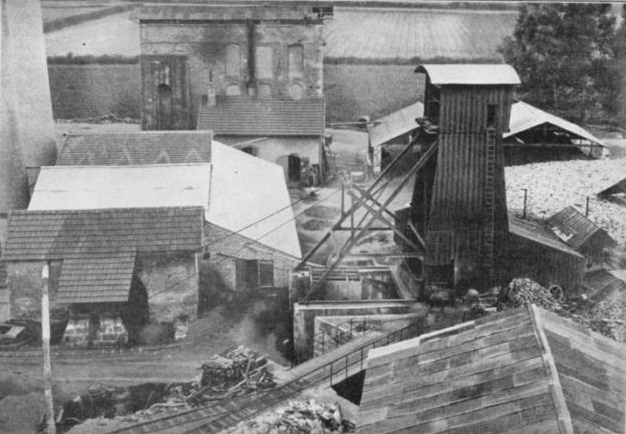
The headframe of an extraction shaft.

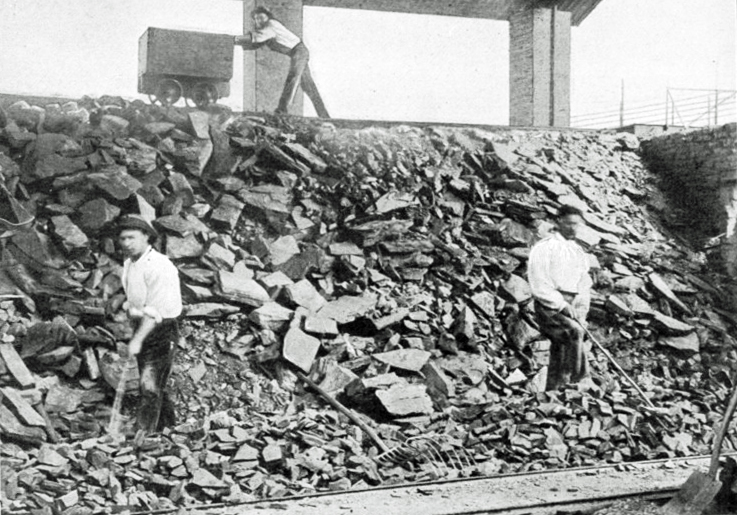
Shale preparation.

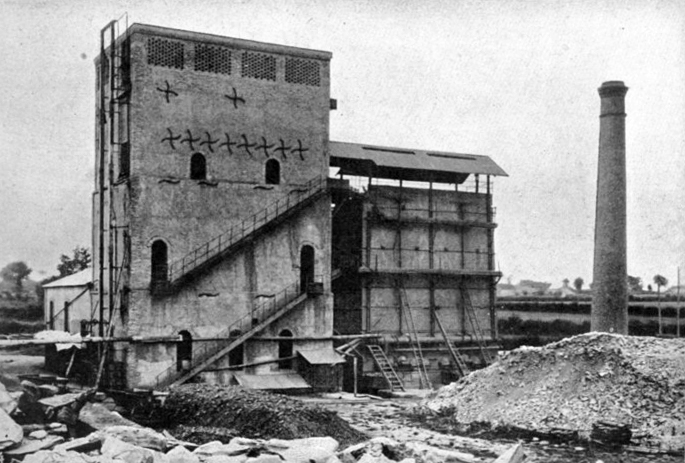
Crushing and stockpiling.

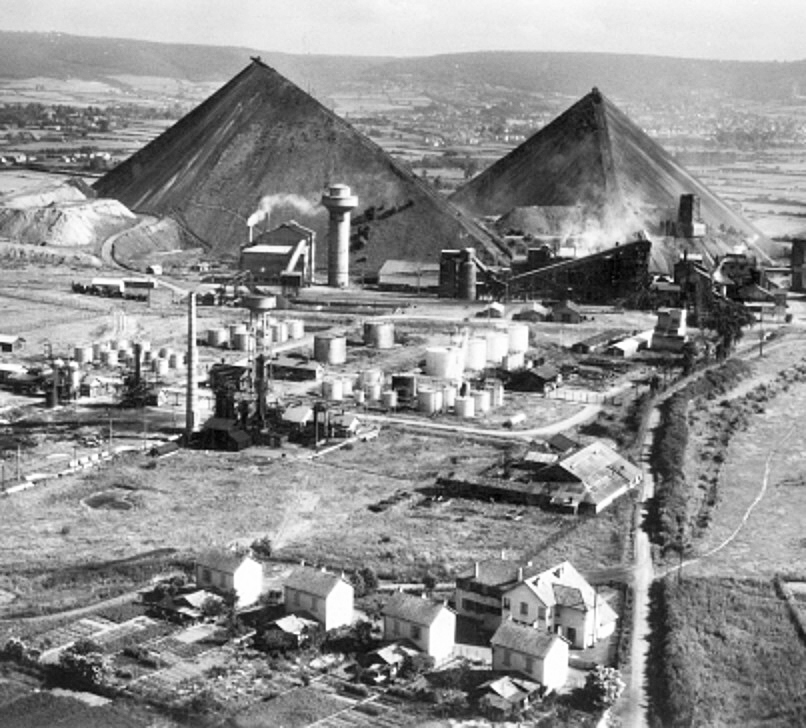
Overview.

Following the site's closure in 1957, it was dismantled and partially demolished. At the beginning of the 21st century, the landscape was marked by the site remains, including ruins and two large slag heaps. These had become overrun by distinctive vegetation, which has been studied for its biodiversity. The site is recognized as a natural area of ecological, faunistic, and floristic interest (ZNIEFF).

The mining remnants of Télots

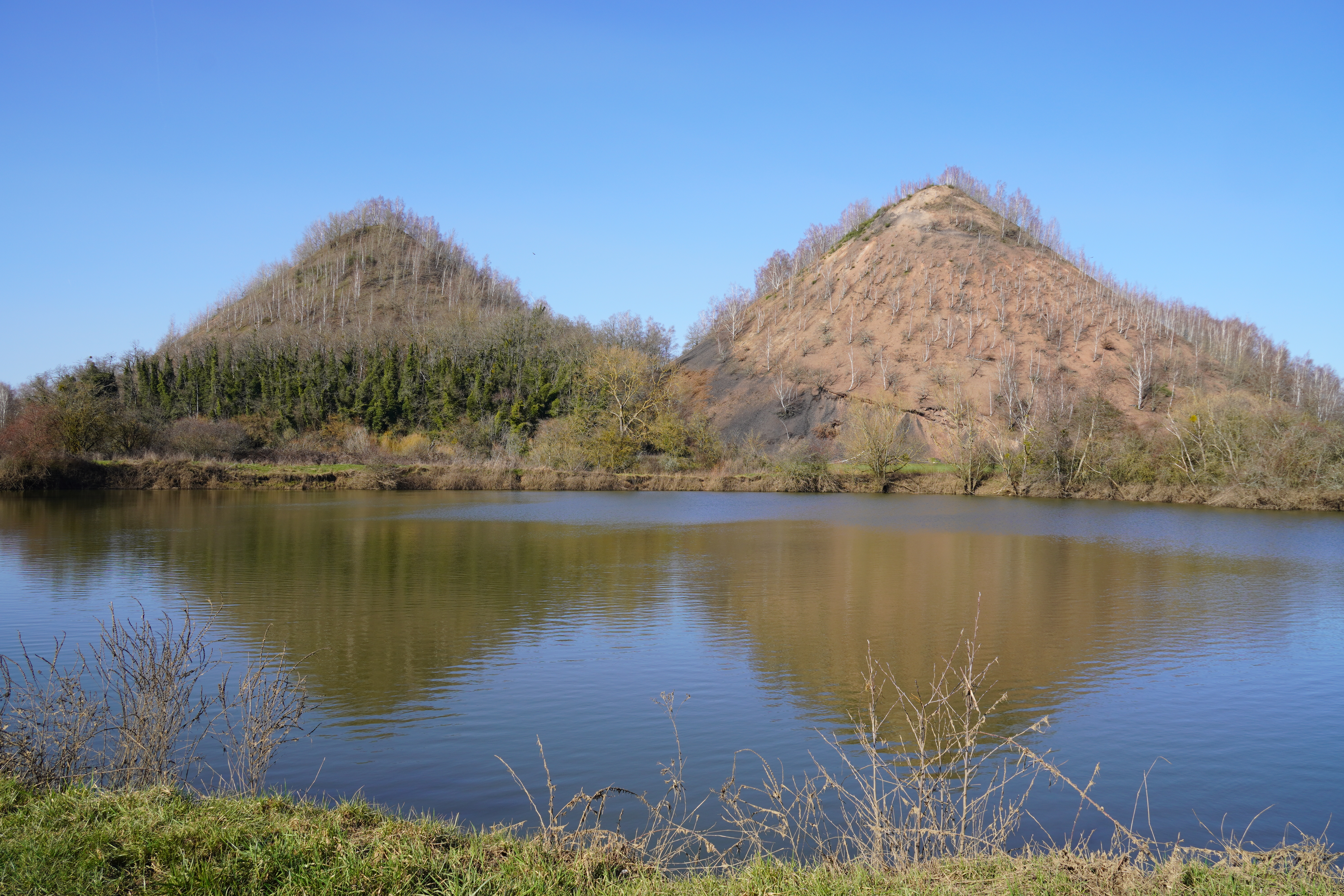
Two slag heaps.

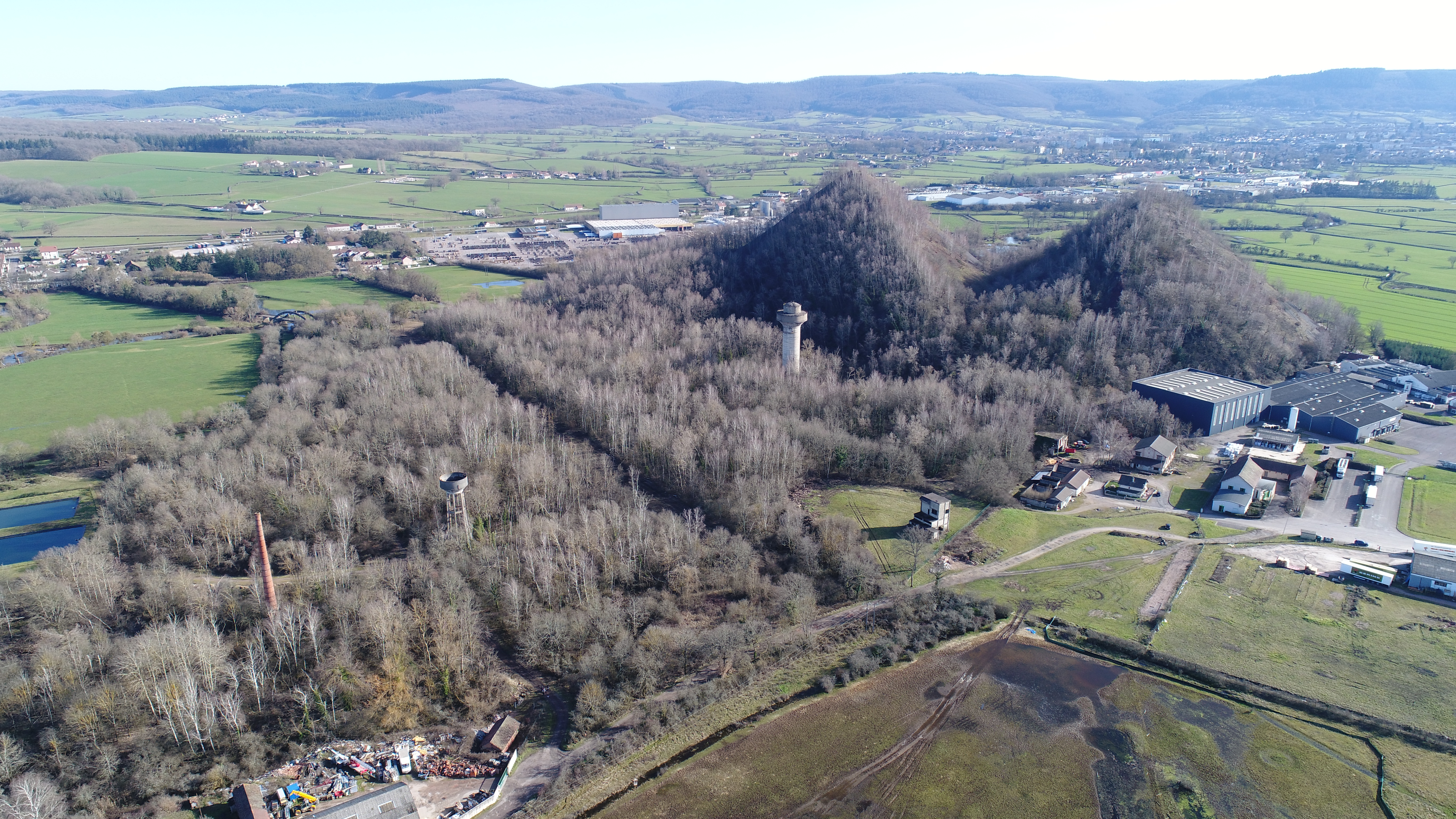
General aerial view.

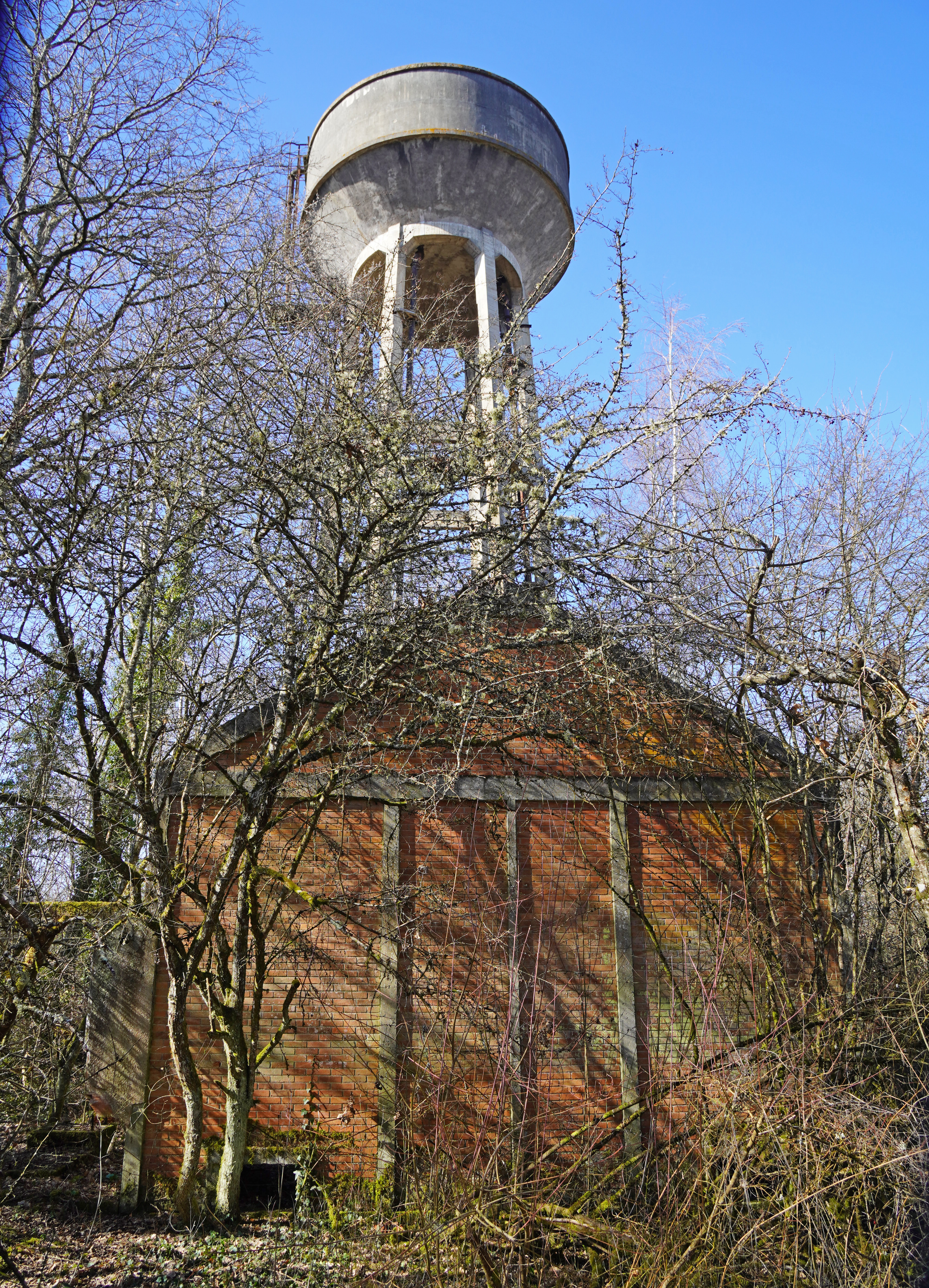
Water tank.

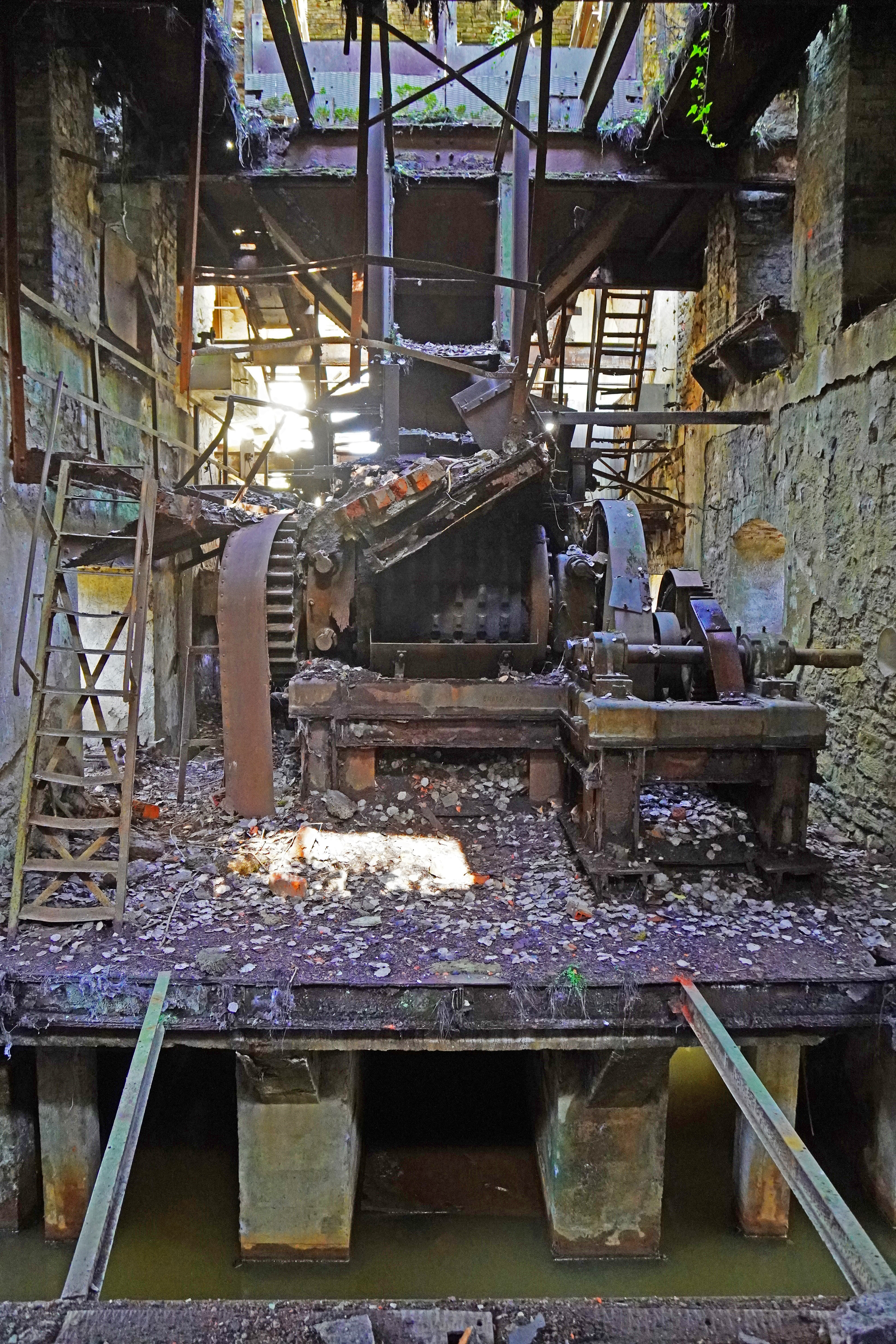
Crusher.

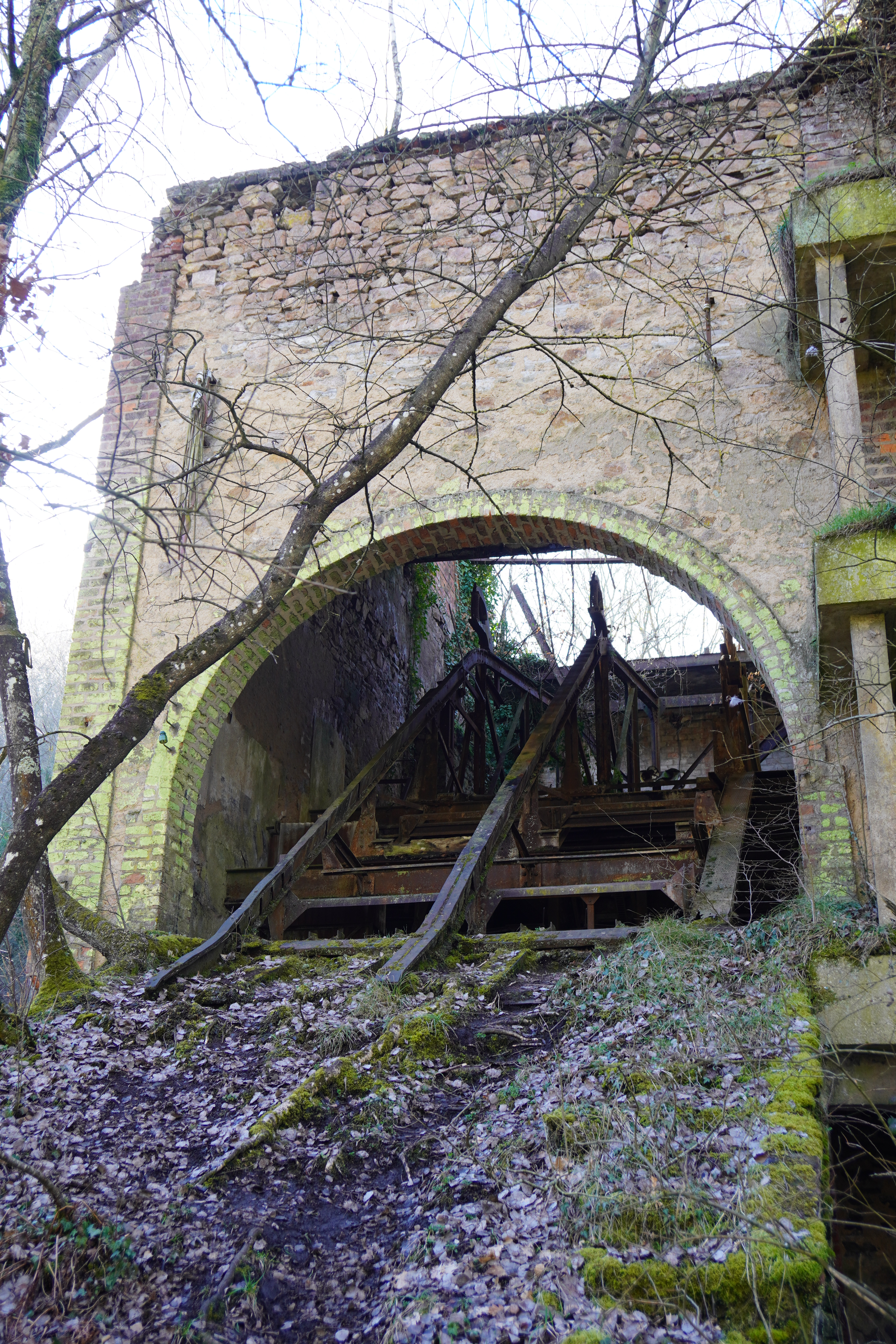
Downhill machinery.

The Millery incline is linked to the workings of Télots via the tenth layer. At the beginning of the 21st century, the backfilled entrance and the windlass building were still visible.

The Millery yard

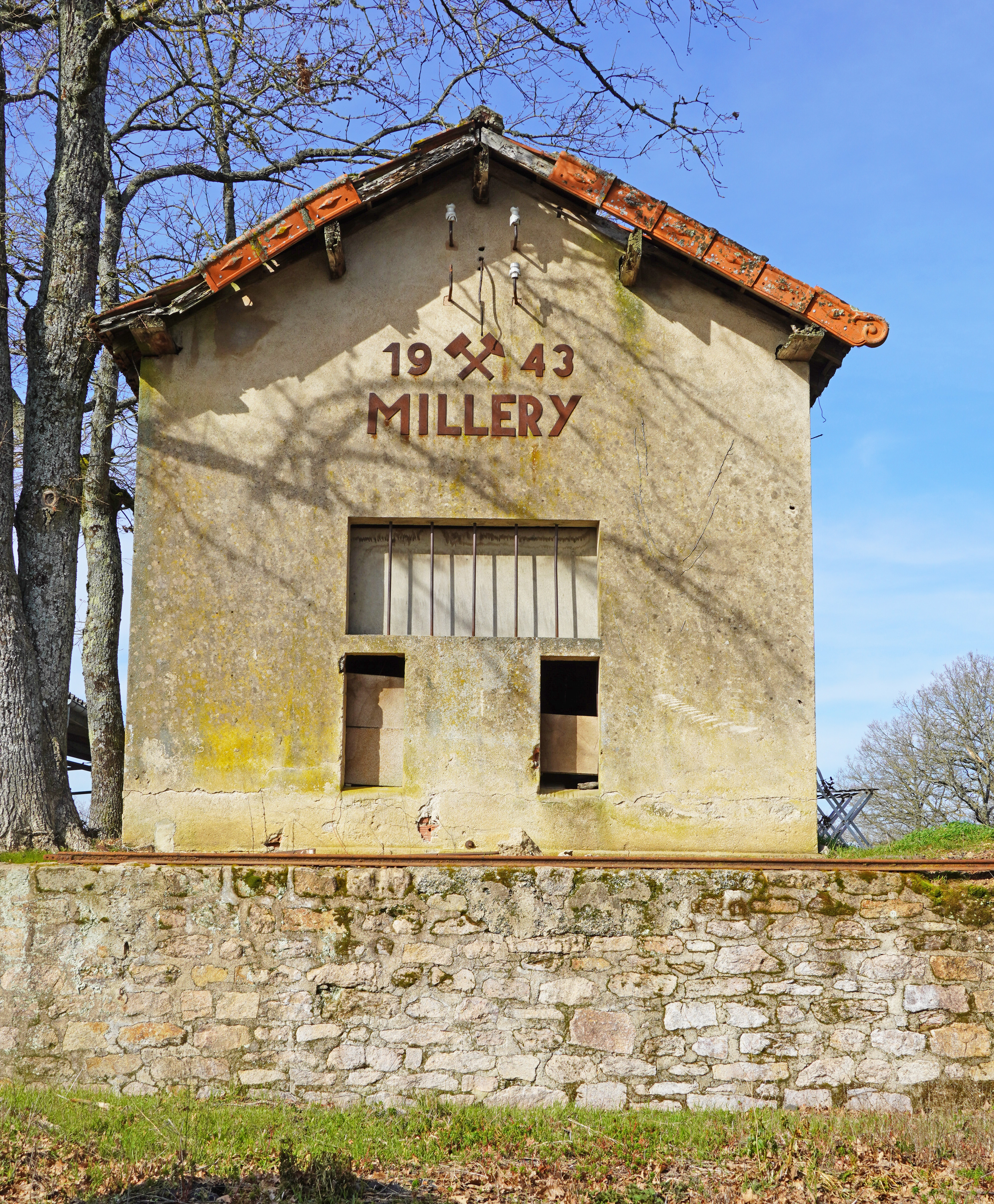
Windlass.

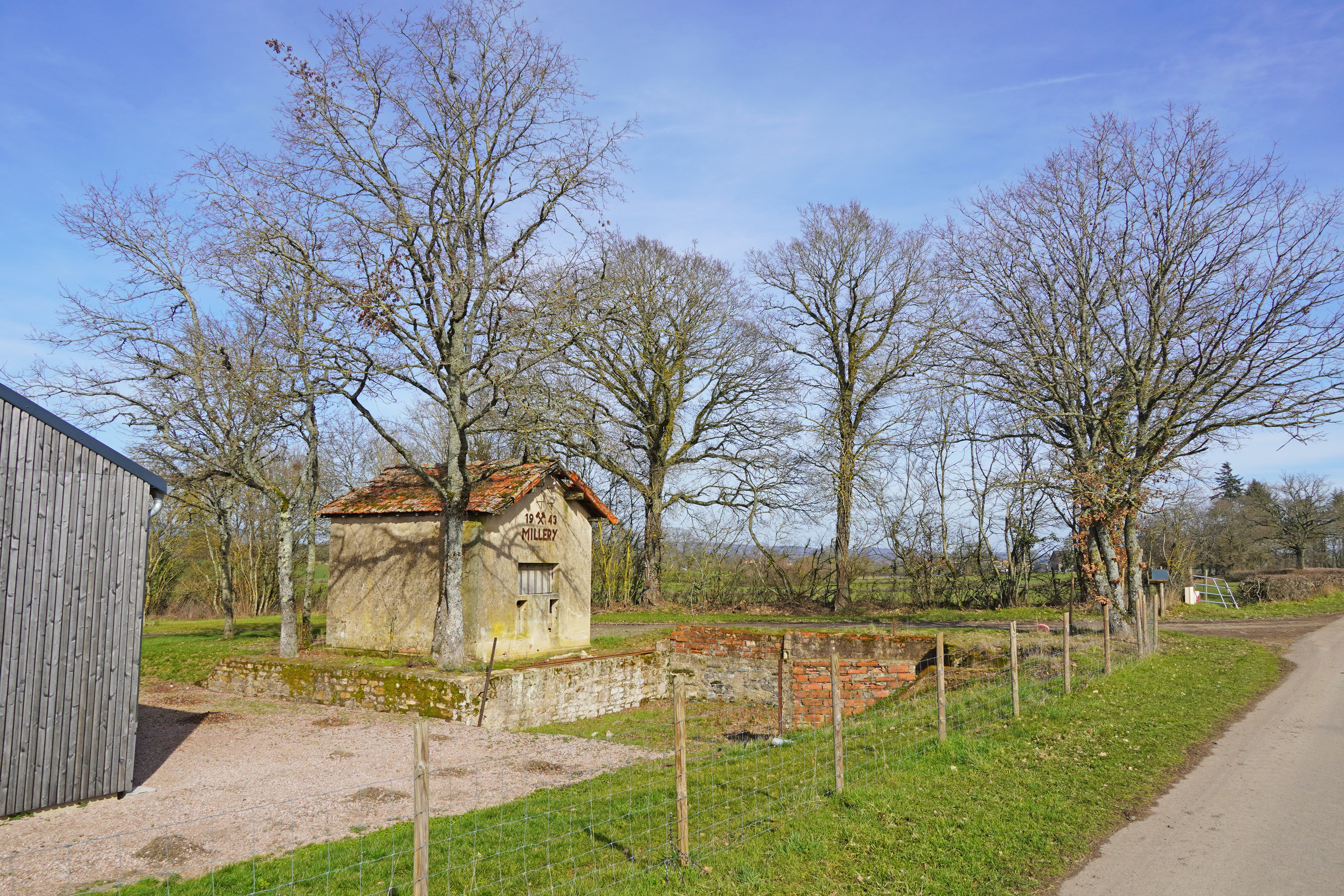
Overview.

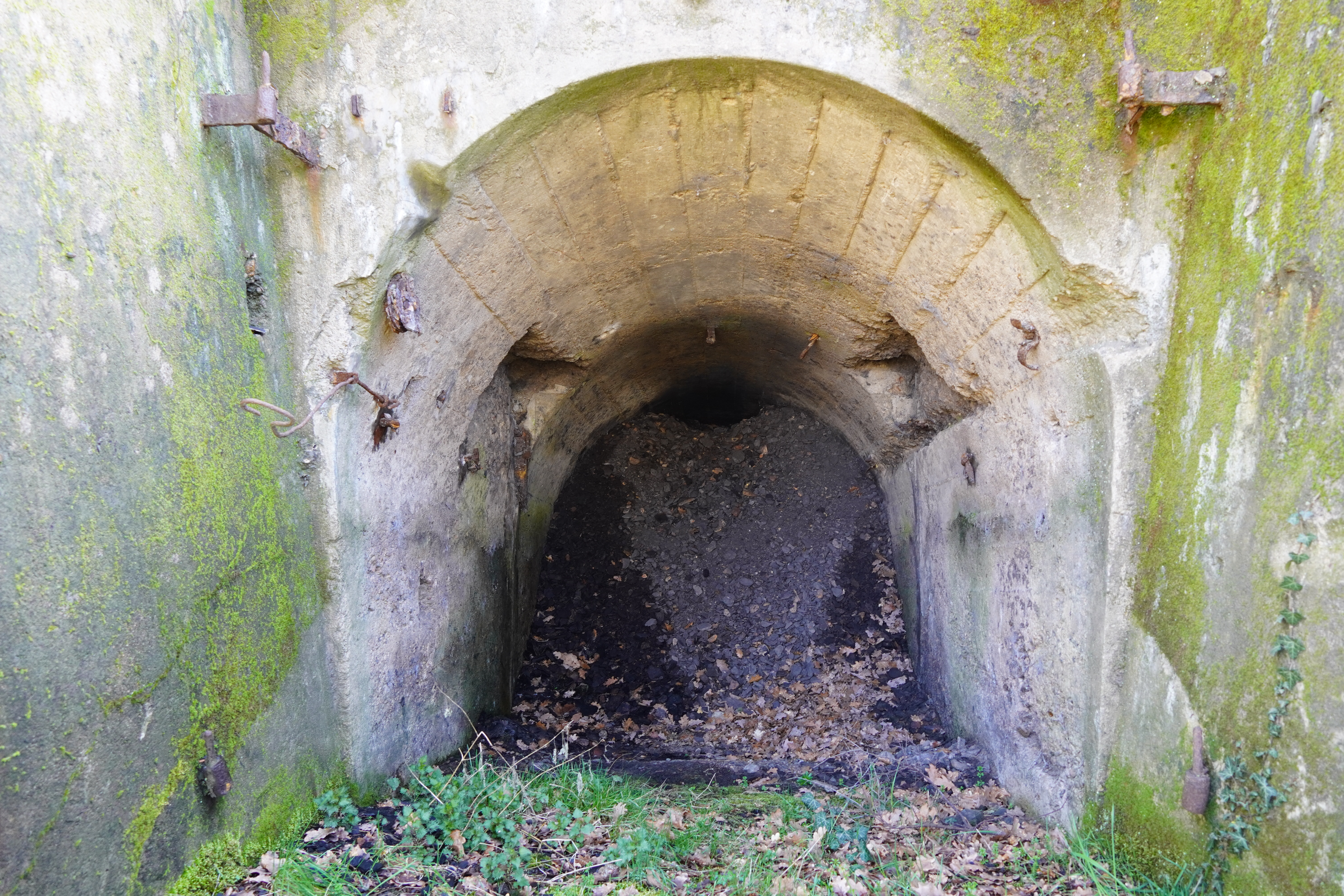
Backfilled entrance.

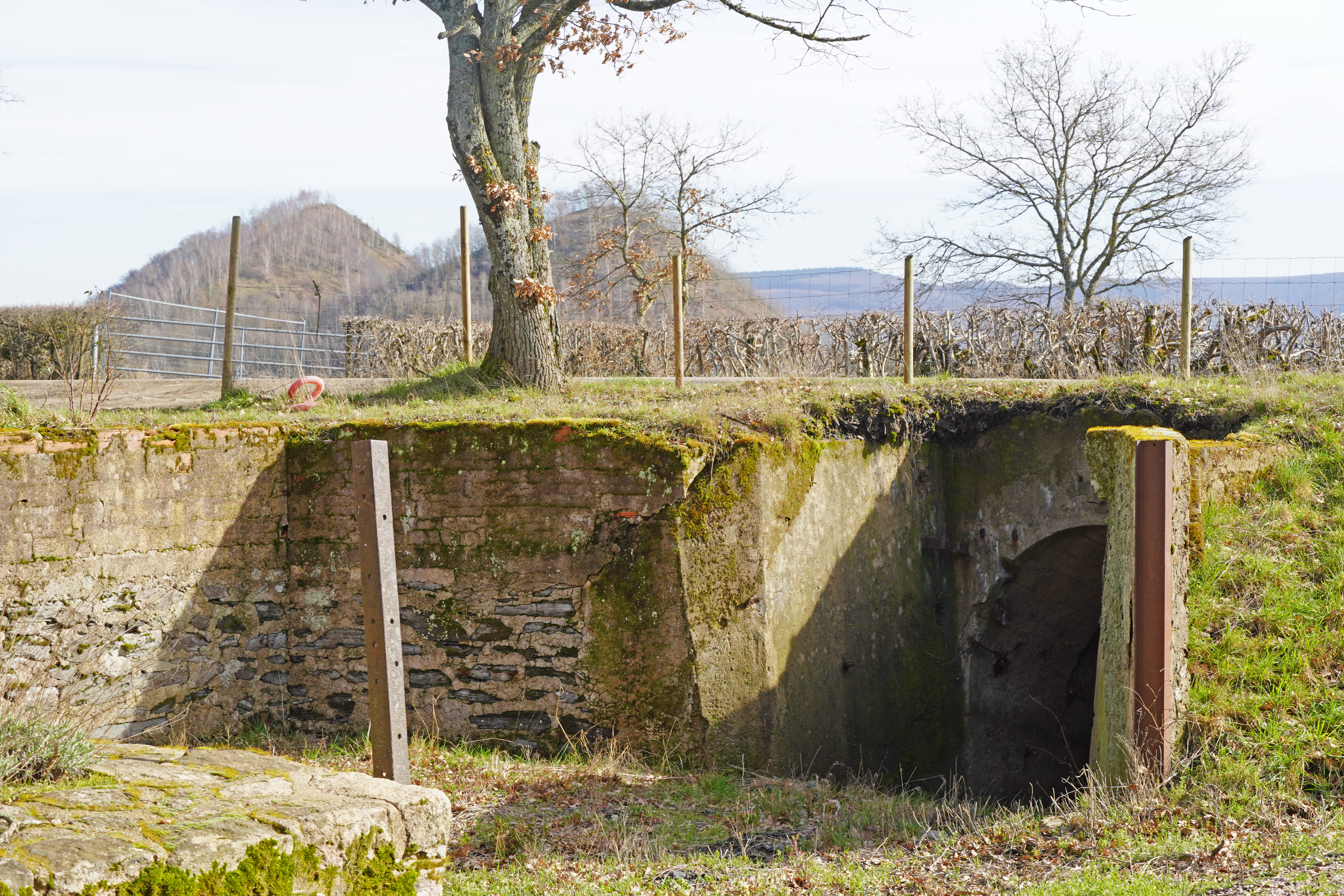
The entrance with the Télots slag heaps in the background.

=== Moloy, Grand-Moloy, and Saint-Léger-du-Bois concession ===
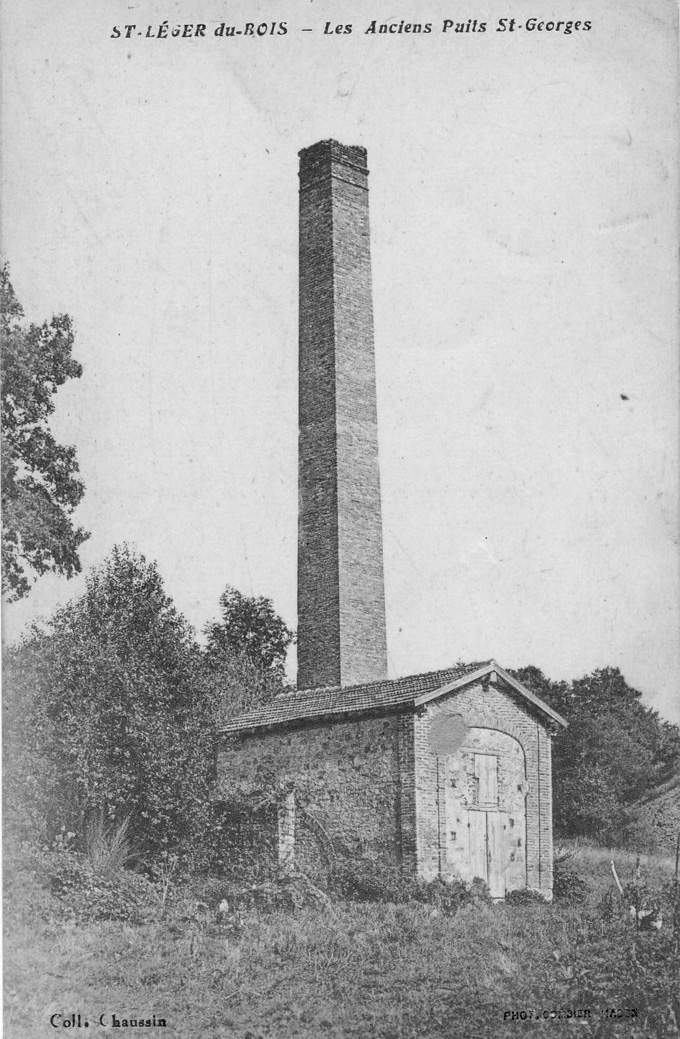
The Saint-Georges shaft, disused after 1900.

The concession employs diverse techniques to mine oil shale, including room and pillar mining, longwall mining, and isolated galleries. The depth of the workings is approximately 100 meters.

At the beginning of the 21st century, the Saint-Georges pit still exhibited the slag heap and windlass building that had been constructed at the outset of the 20th century.

Mining remnants

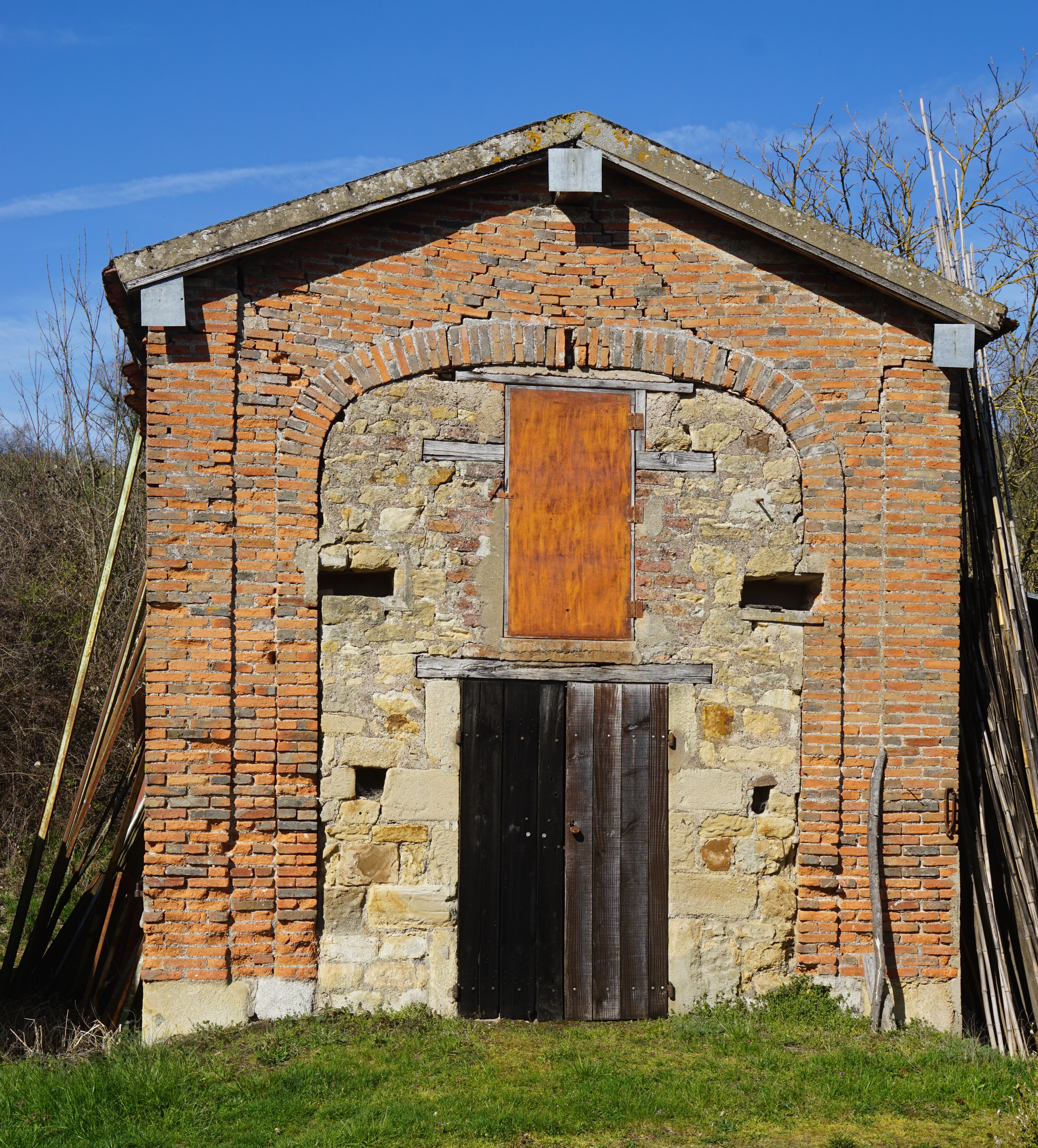
The Saint-Georges shaft windlass building.

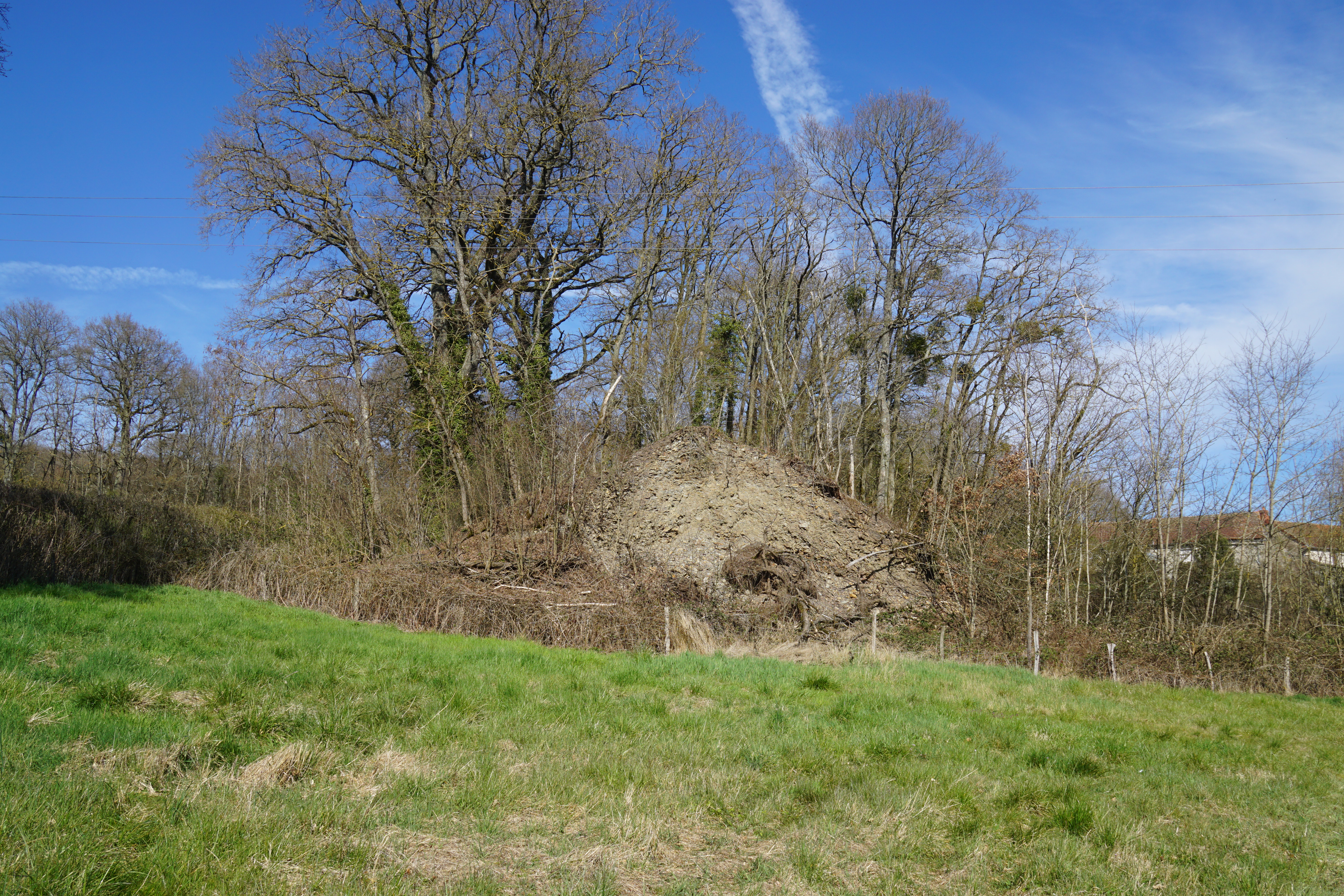
Saint-Georges shaft slag heap.

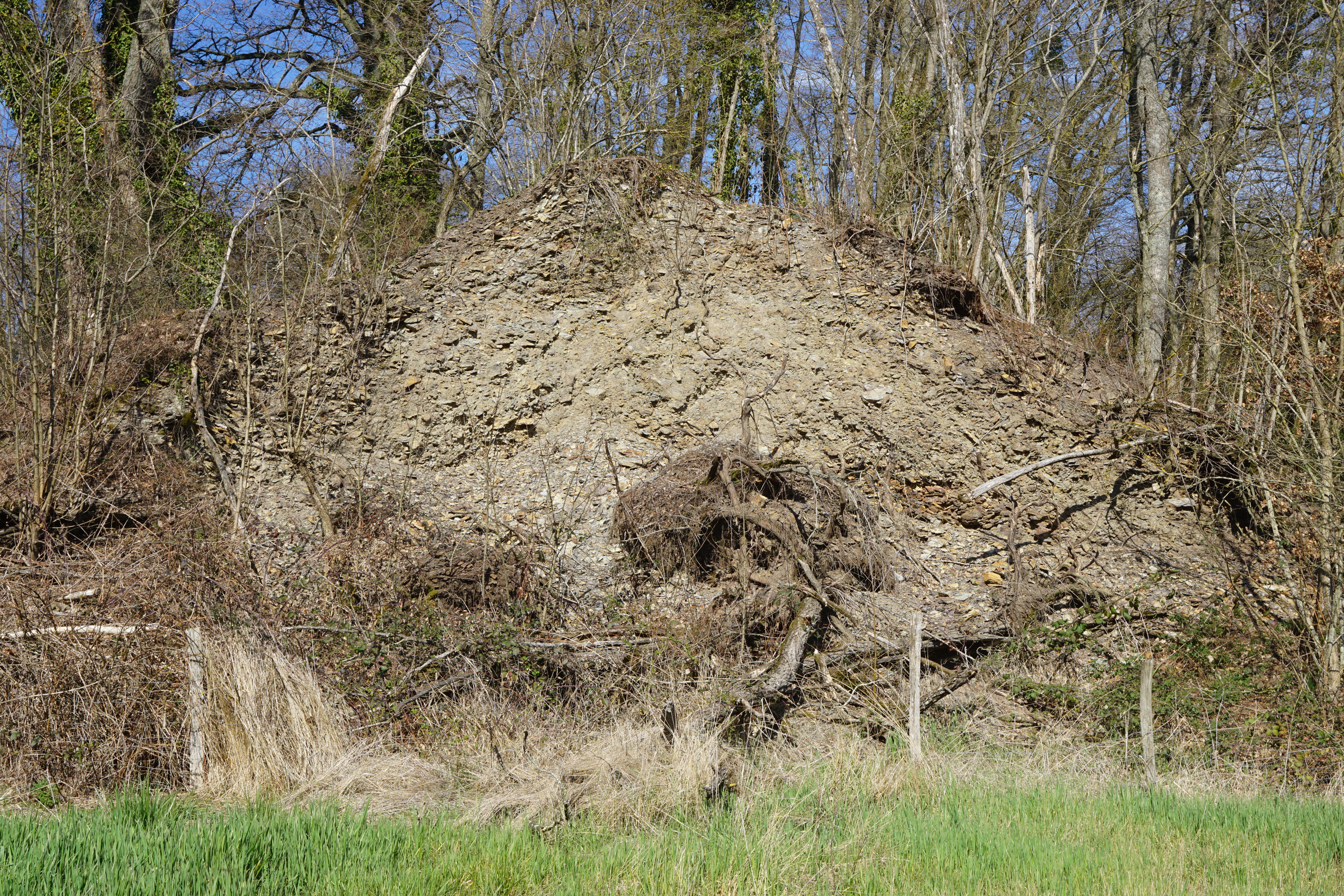
Detail.

=== Champsigny and Lally soncession ===
The concession mines oil shale by longwall mining and pillar removal in Saint-Léger-du-Bois, with underground workings reaching 75 meters in depth.

At the beginning of the 21st century, the slag heap and the location of the Champsigny pit remain.

Mining remnants

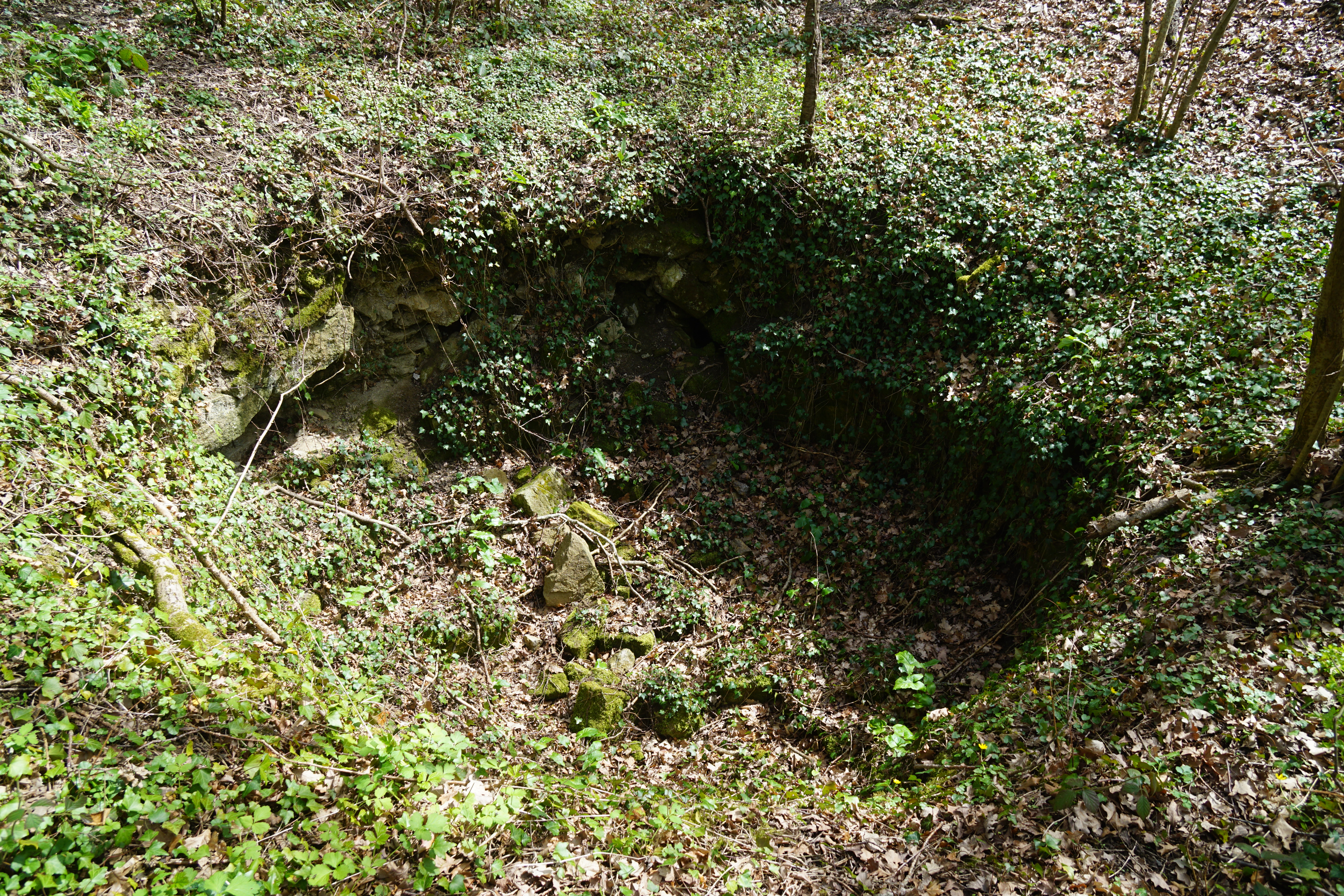
Champsigny shaft.

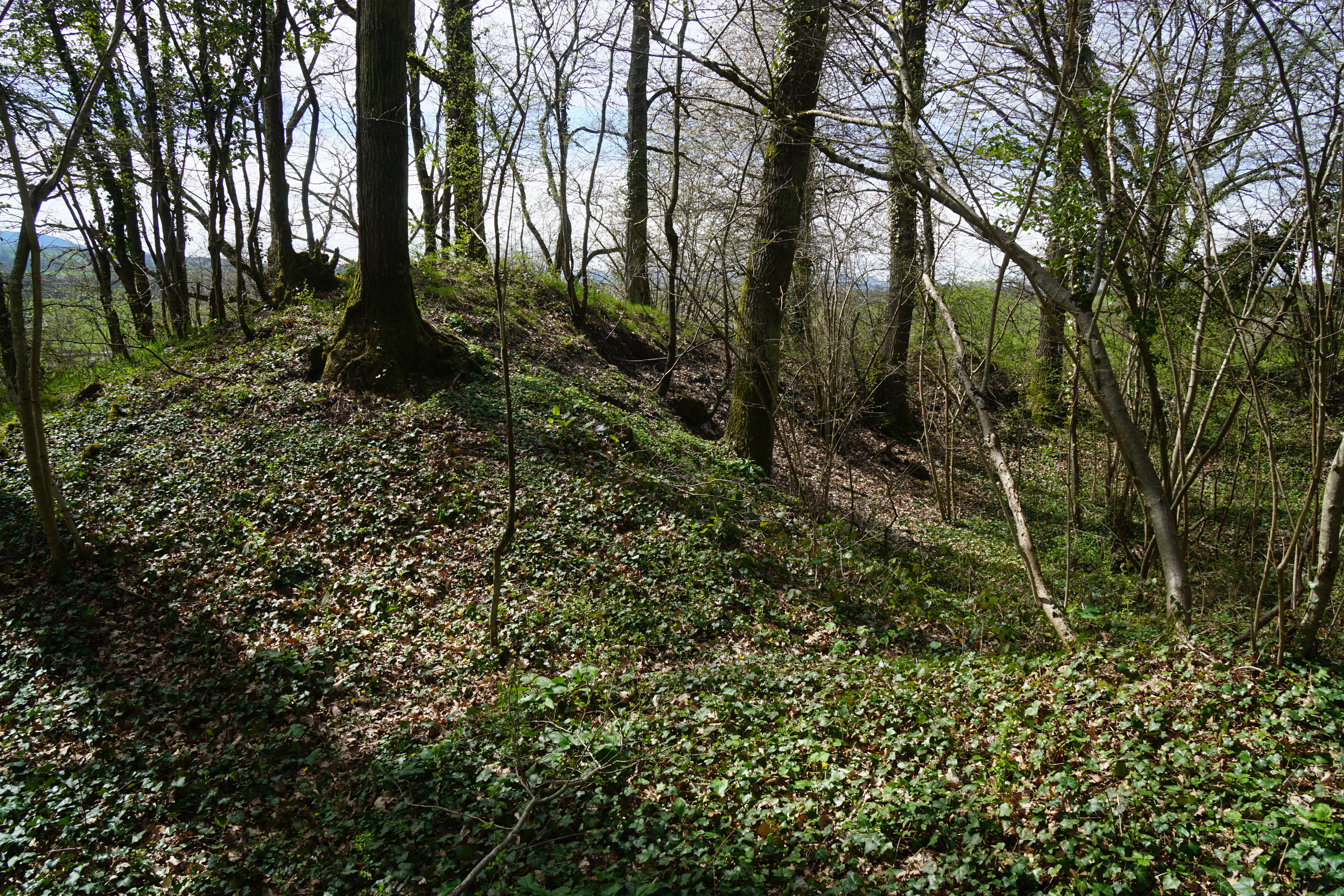
Champsigny shaft slag heap.

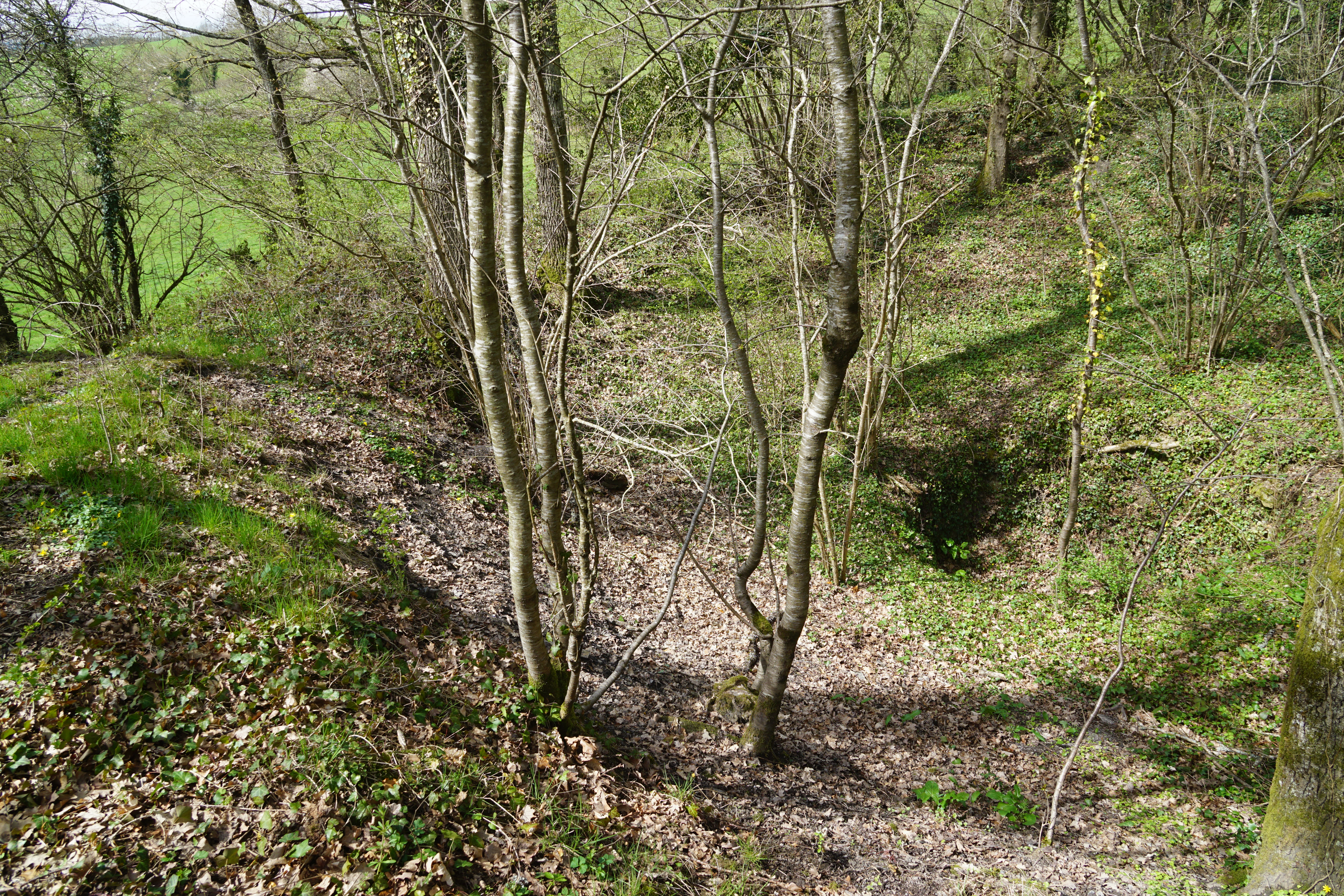
Overview of slag heap and shaft.

=== Chevigny concession ===
The concession in question mines oil shale in the commune of Tavernay using the room and pillar mining method. The depth of the underground workings is 80 meters.

=== Miens concession ===
This concession mines oil shale through exploratory works, irregular galleries, and stripped or caved areas. The Ravelon mine was one of the primary exploitations of the deposit in the 1870s; it was subsequently abandoned following the 1914 French mobilization. The Muse and Miens plants were established in the 1870s and were highly active between 1883 and 1905.

In the early years of the 21st century, a number of galleries and vestiges of the two original plants remained in situ.

=== Comaille, Ruet, and Poisot concessions ===
These concessions mine oil shale in the commune of Tavernay using the room and pillar mining method, which is rarely stripped. The underground workings extend to a depth of 48 meters. During the nineteenth century, Tavernay was home to five shale plants. These were situated in Poizot, Bois de La Revenue, Pont Renault, La Marbre, and a substantial facility close to La Comaille. This latter plant employed up to 110 workers and ceased operations permanently in 1903. Most mines and plants remained operational for a mere twenty to thirty years.

At the beginning of the 21st century, the landscape still bore witness to the presence of several abandoned slag heaps and mine pits.

Remnants of the oil shale mines of Bois Saint-Romain

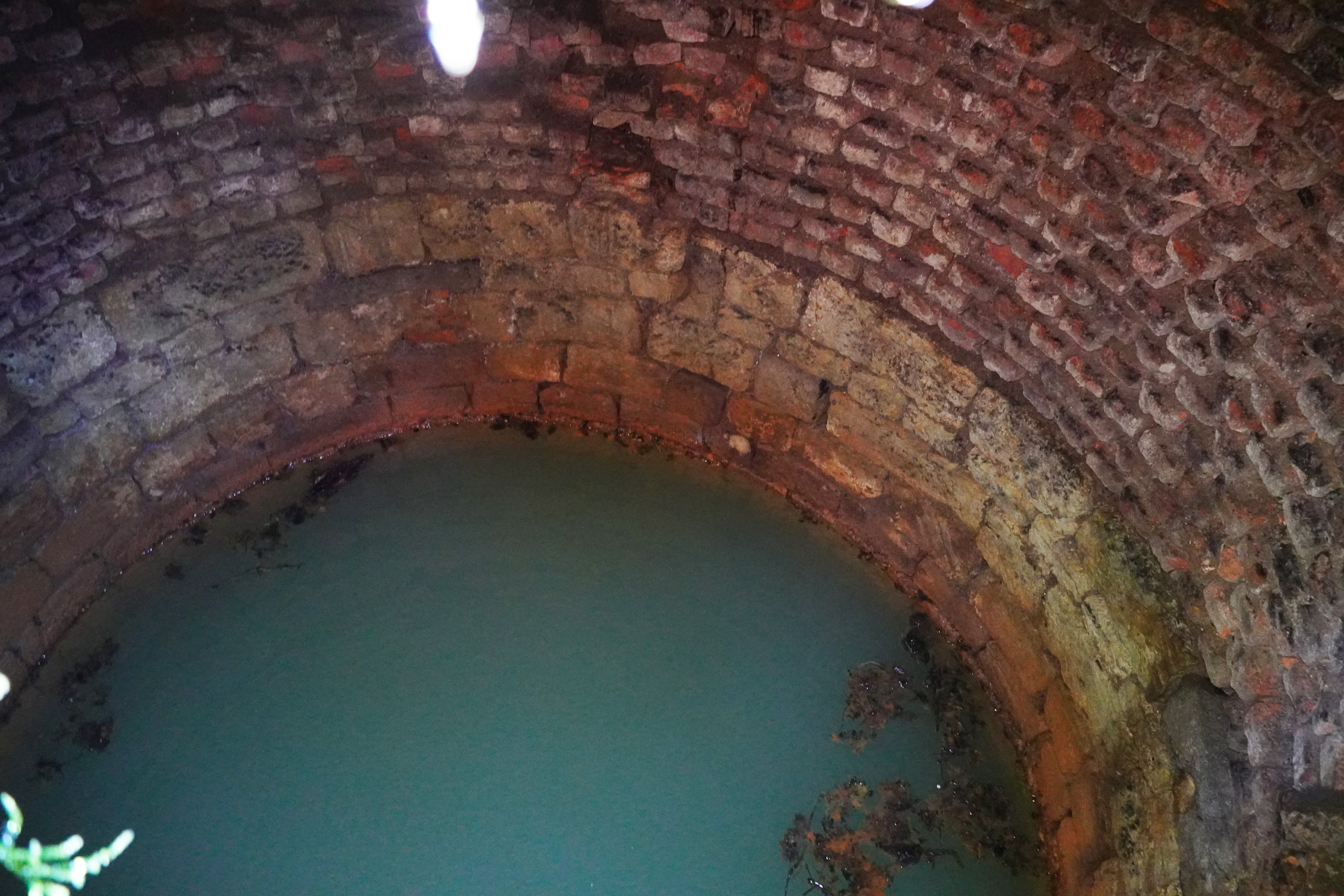
Esterno shaft.

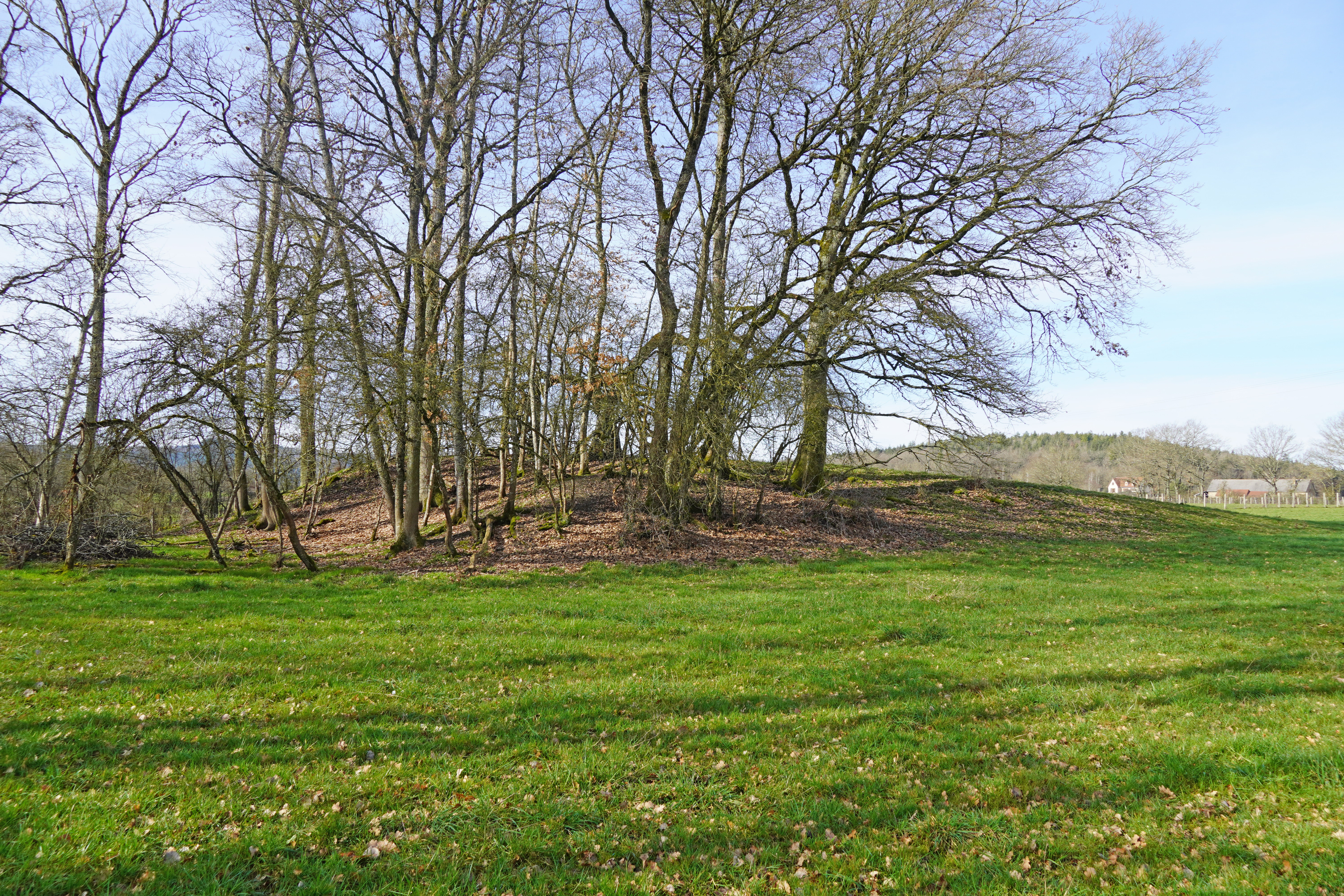
Esterno shaft slag heap.

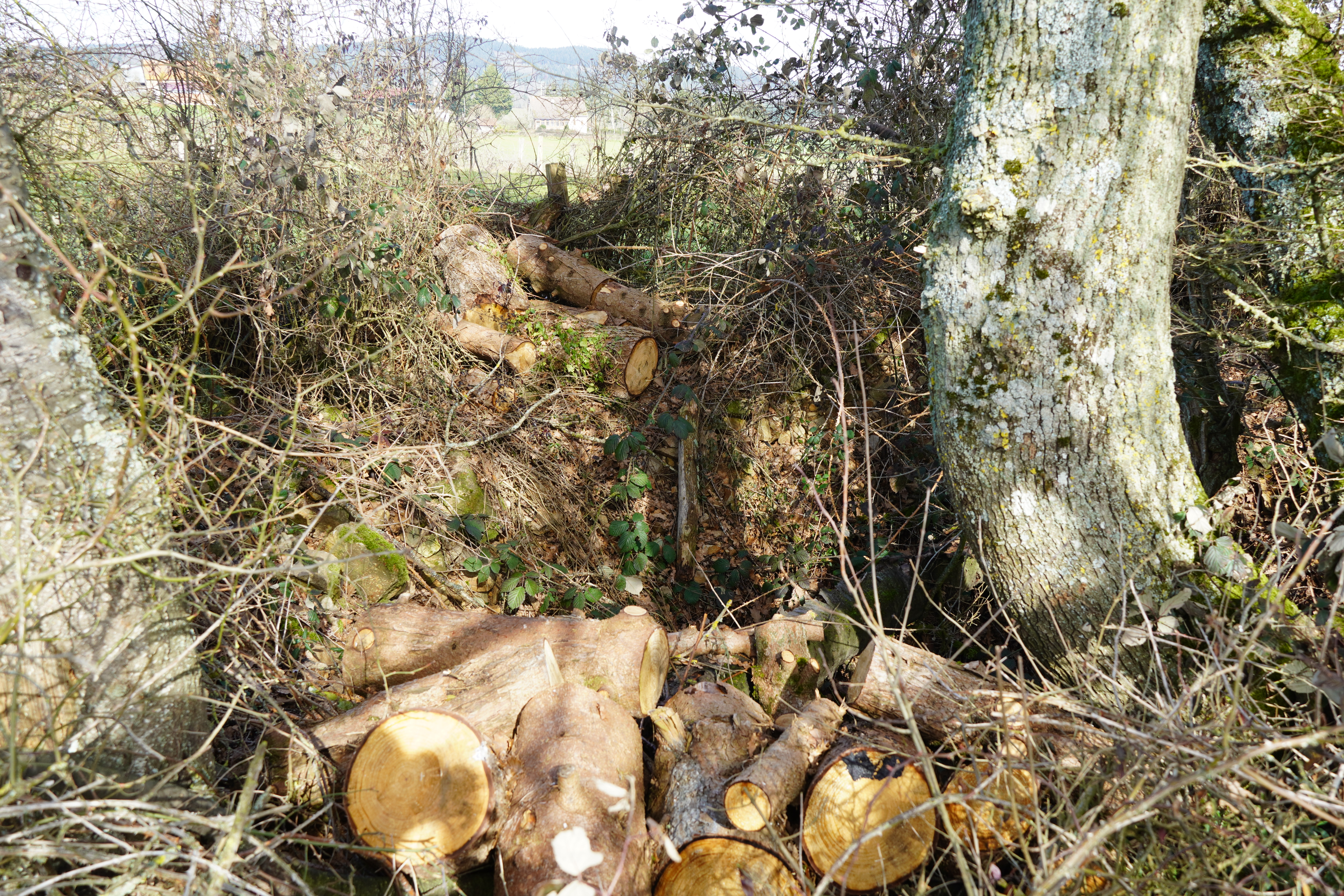
Guilloux shaft.

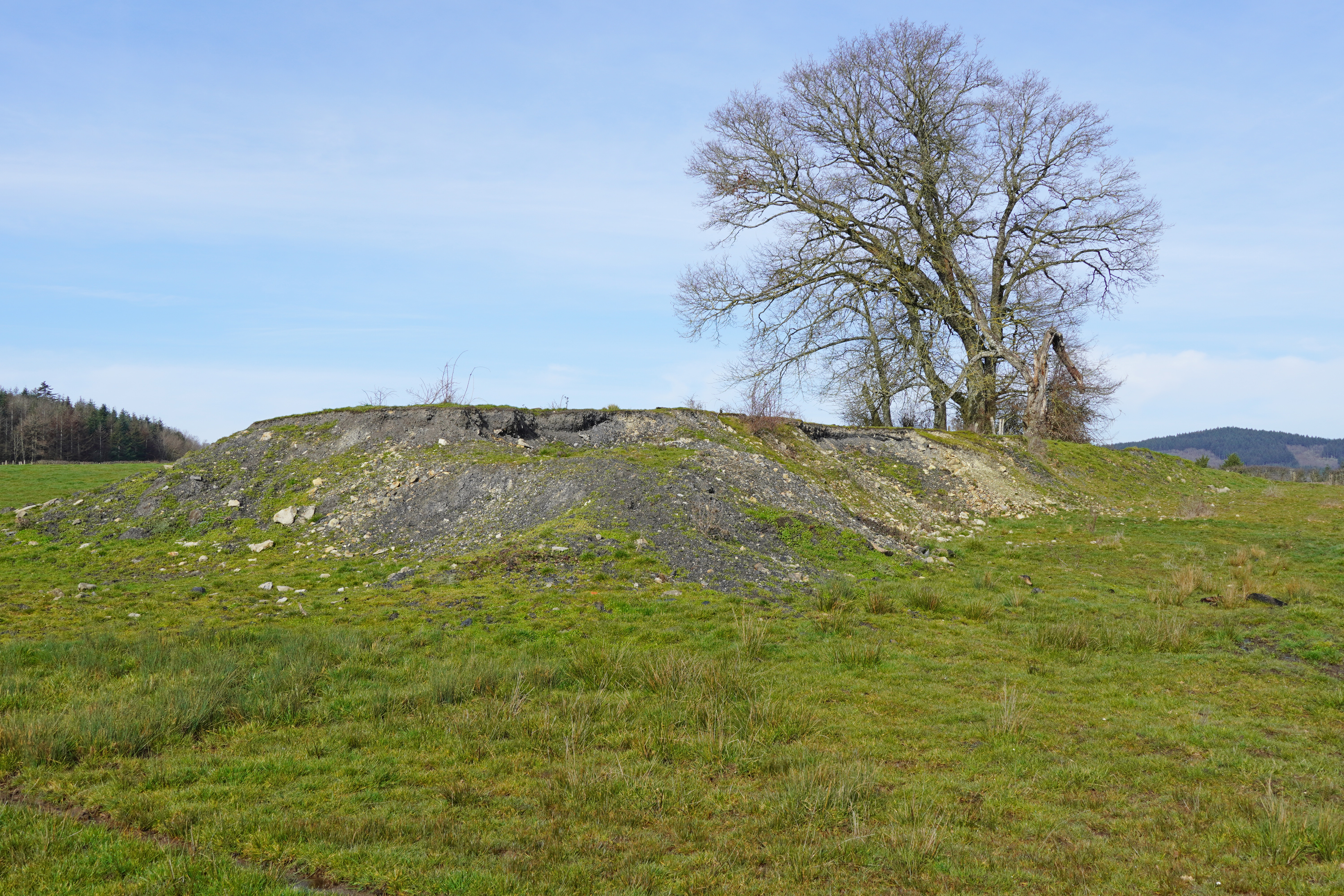
Guilloux shaft slag heap.
Remnants of the oil shale mines of Comaille

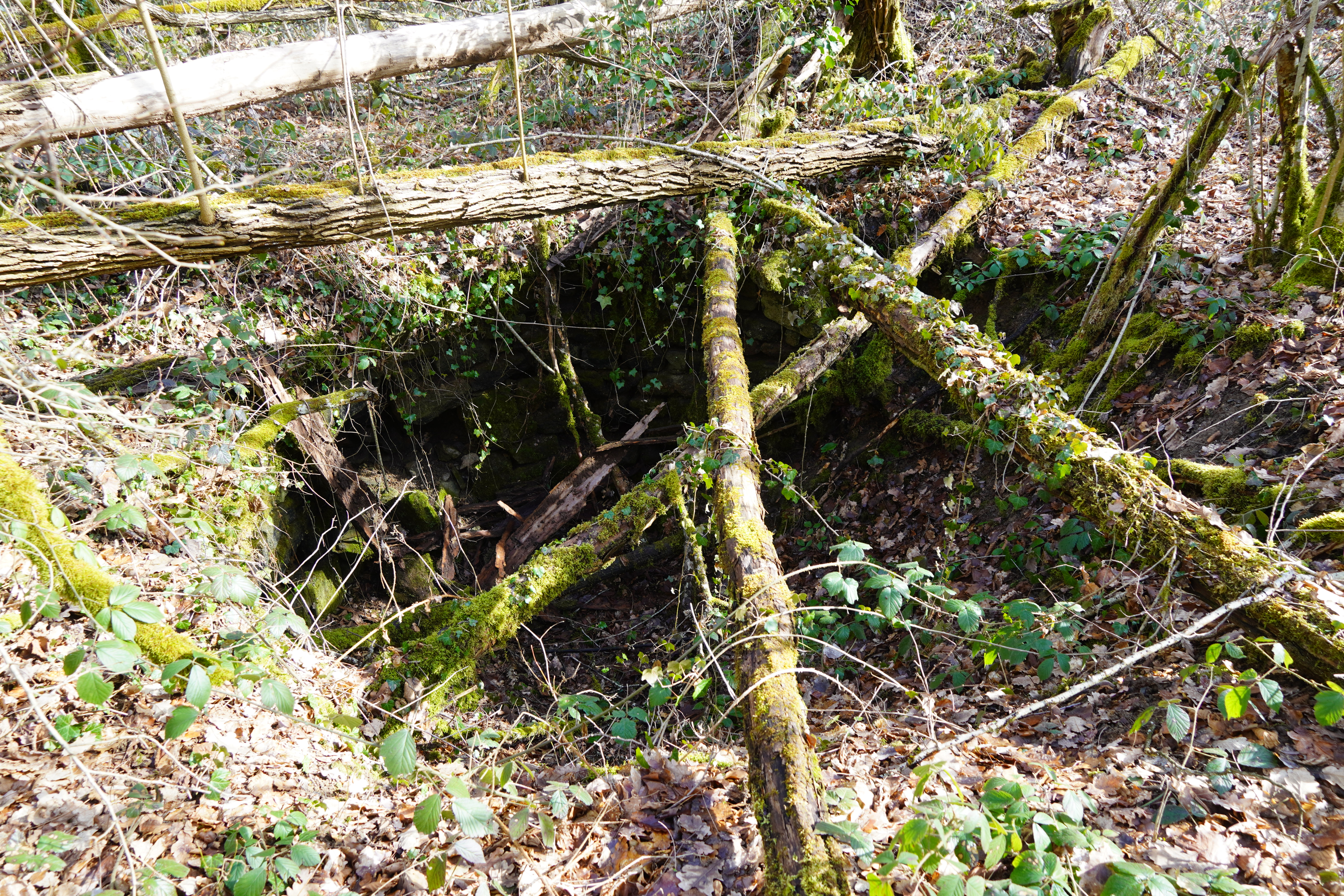
Sainte-Marie shaft.

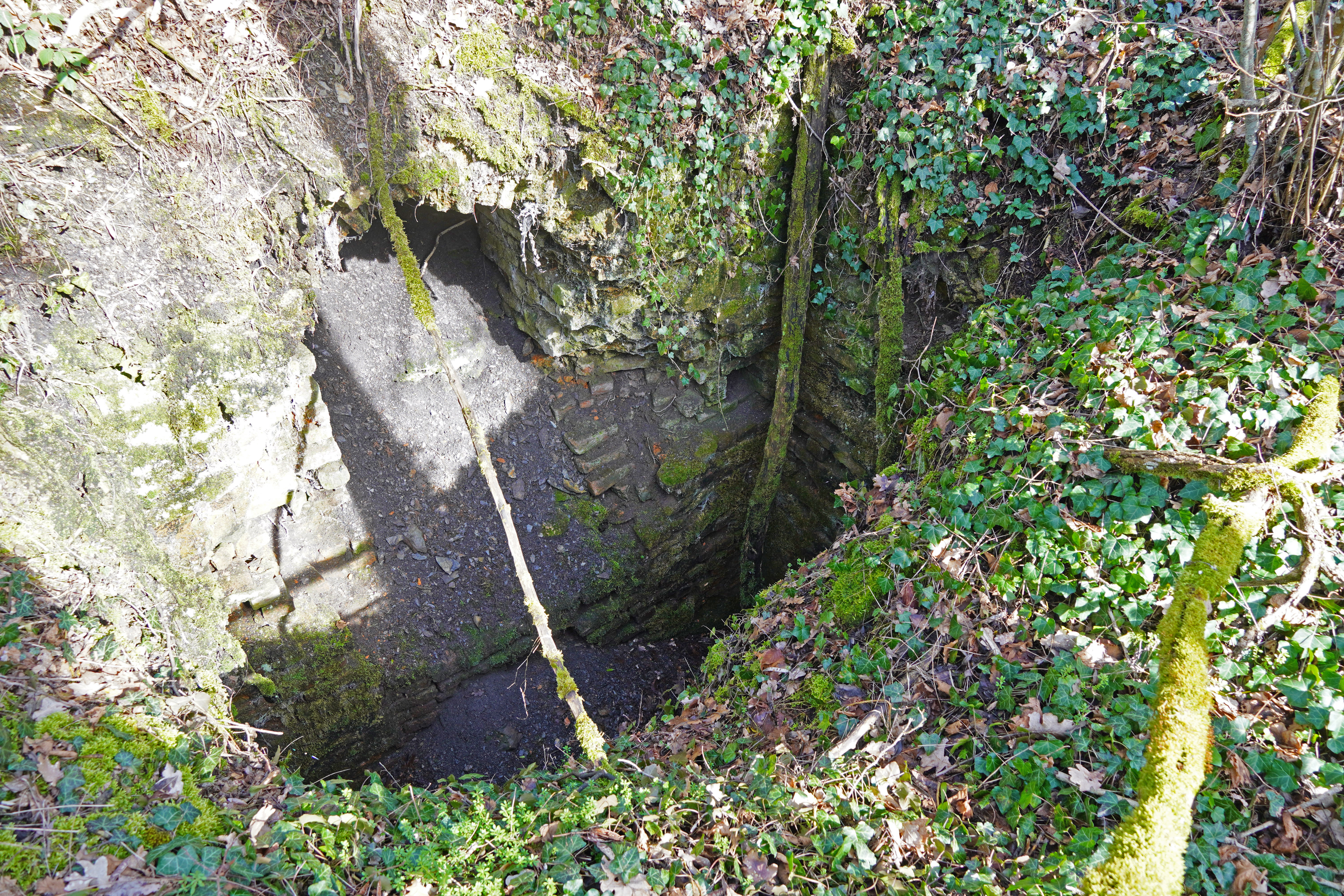
Pré Renaud shaft.

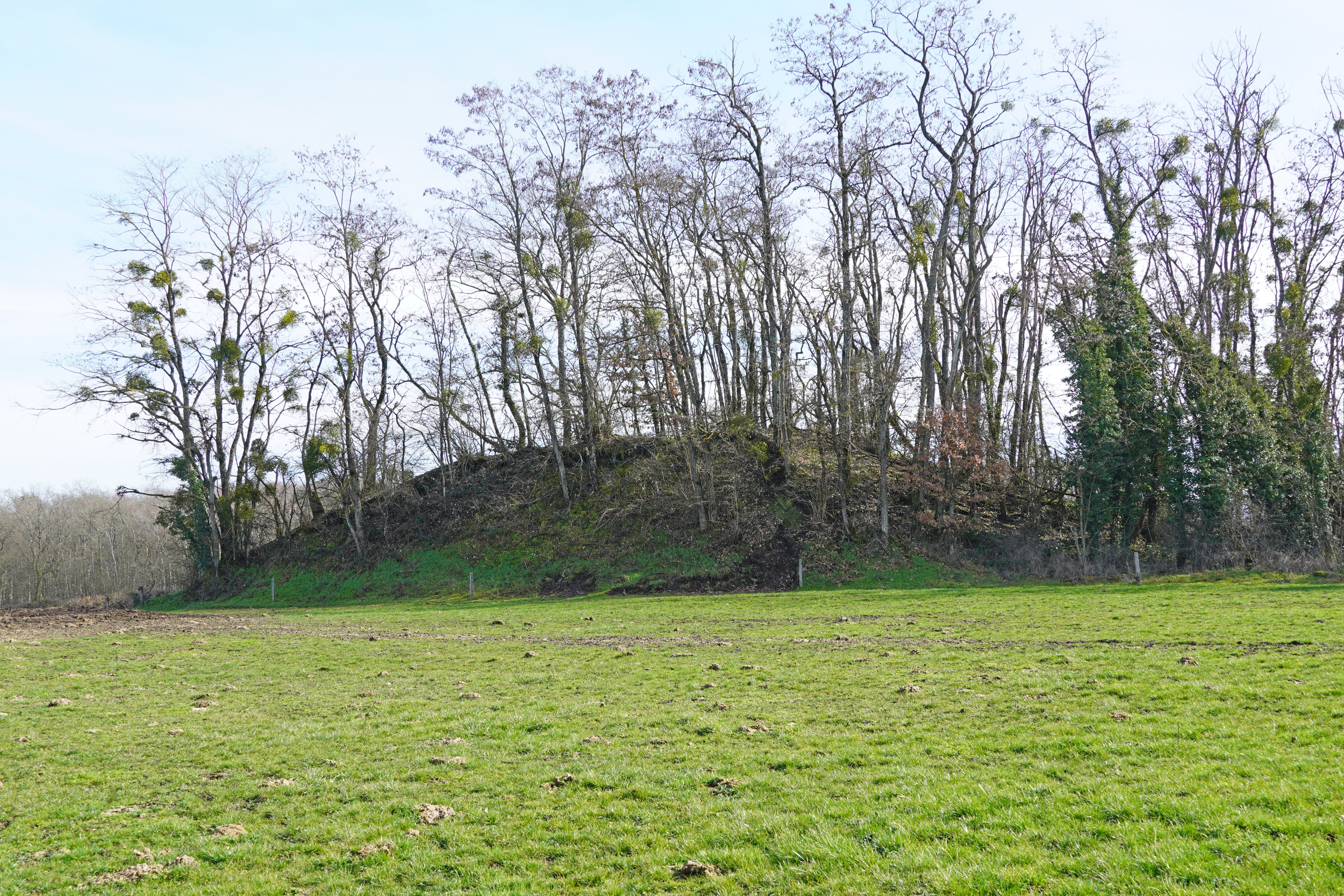
The Pré Renaud slag heap.

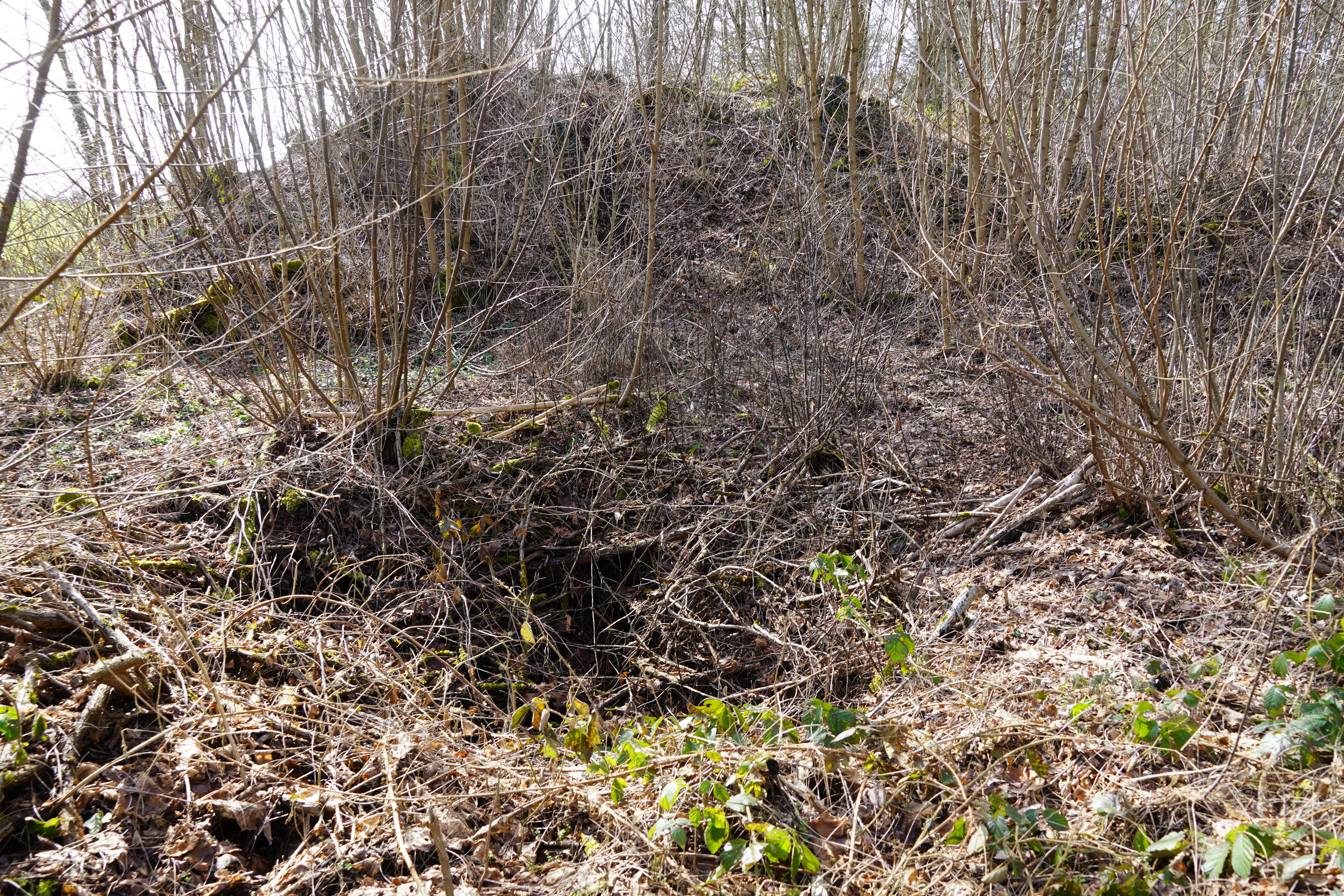
Shaft No. III and its slag heap.

=== Igornay and Petite-Chaume concessions ===
The concessions mine oil shale in the commune of Igornay using the room and pillar mining method. The underground workings extend to a depth of 60 meters.

At the beginning of the 21st century, the Selligue pit, subsidence, and an open-pit mine remained in operation.

=== Margenne concession ===
This concession mines oil shale in the commune of Monthelon with longwall mining and backfilling. The underground workings reach a depth of 110 meters.

At the beginning of the 21st century, the Castillion house, a worker's lodging, remains.

Margenne factory
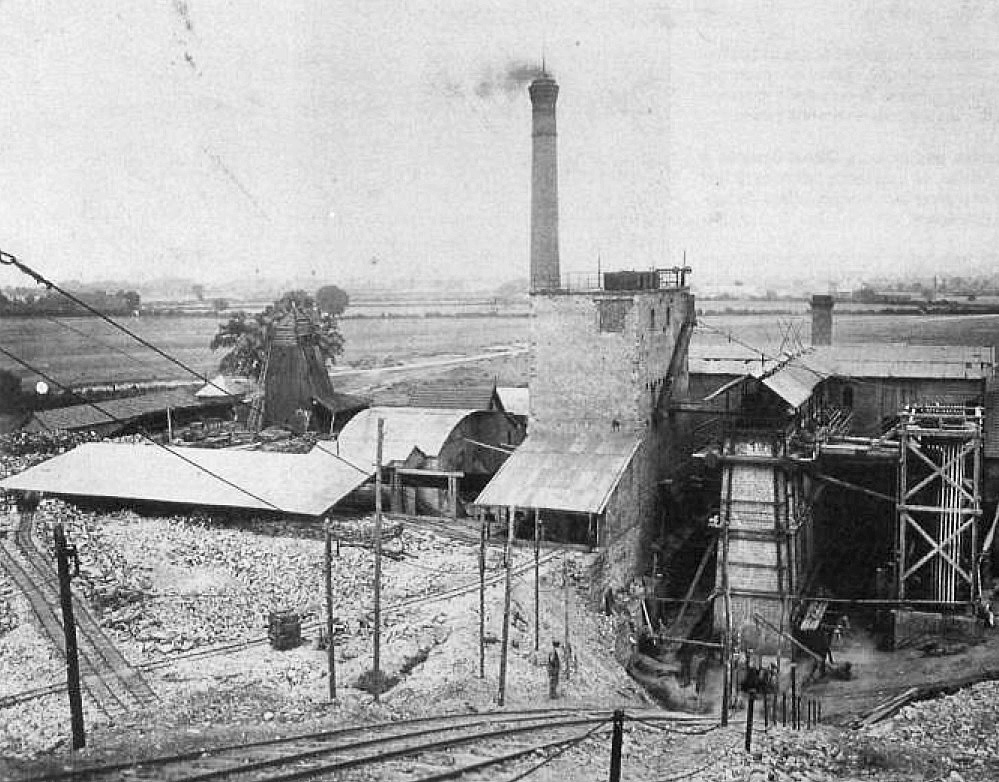
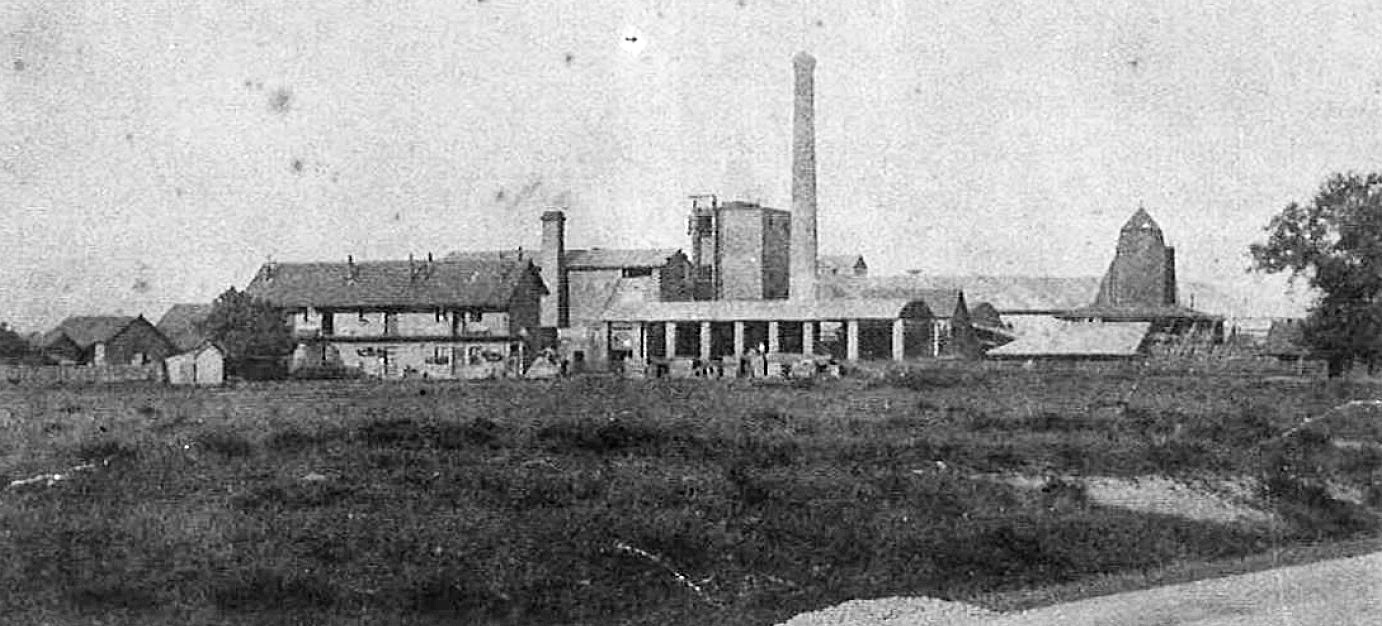

=== Ravelon concession ===
This concession mines oil shale in the commune of Dracy-Saint-Loup using room and pillar mining techniques. The underground workings extend to a depth of 100 meters. The Ravelon mine was one of the primary exploitations of the deposit during the 1870s; it was subsequently abandoned following the 1914 French mobilization.

Ravelon factory

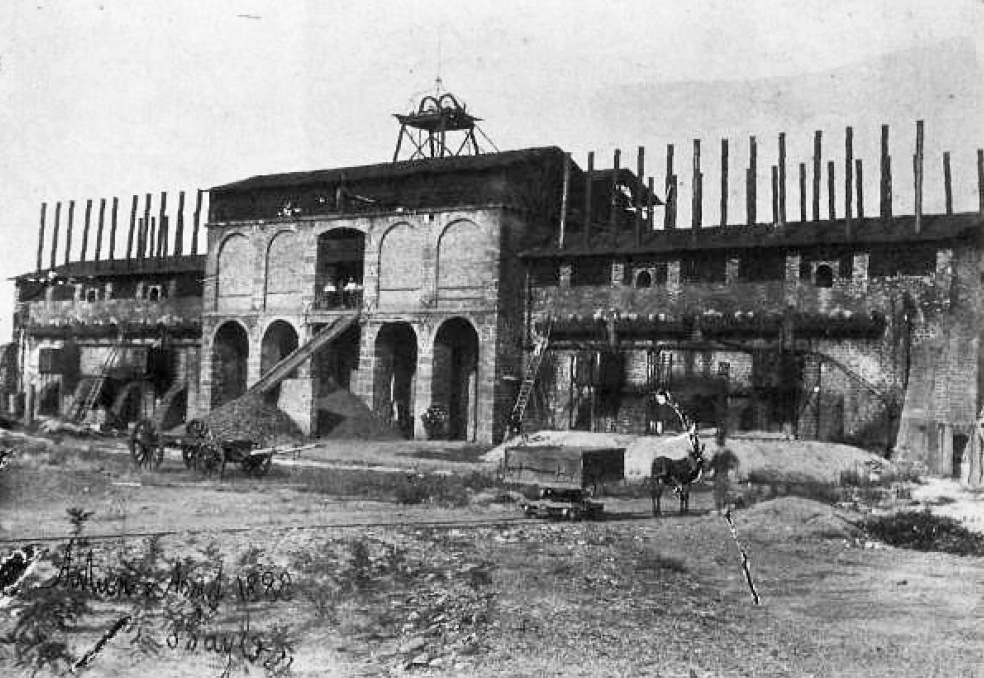
Factory and headframe in 1888.

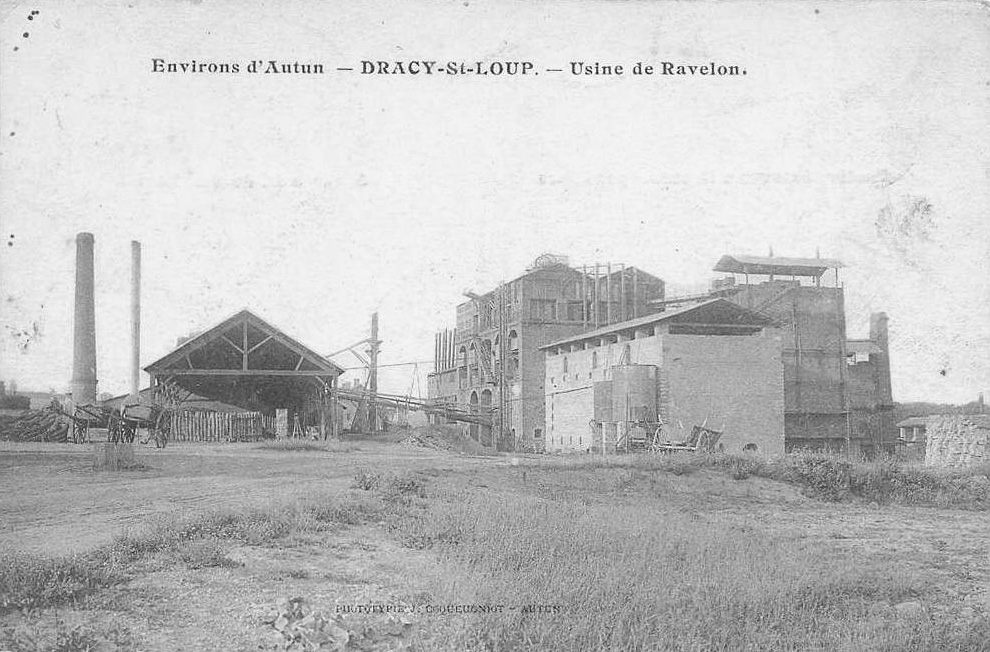
After 1900.

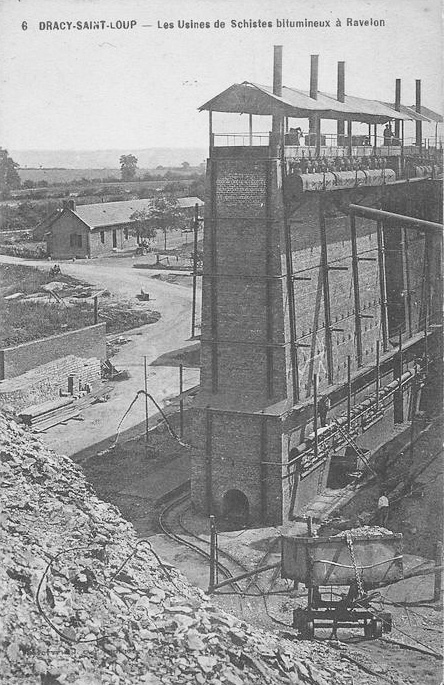

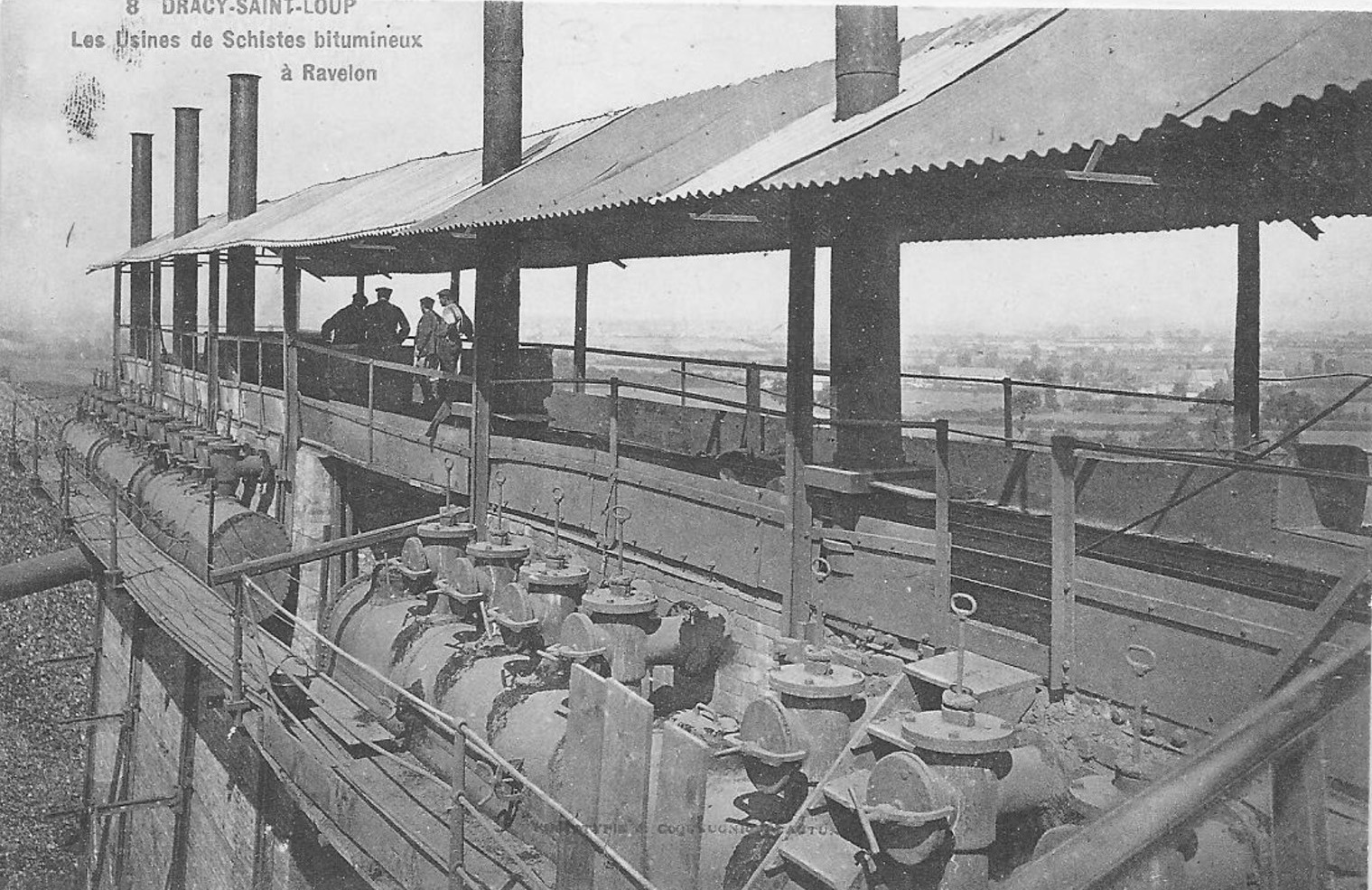

At the beginning of the 21st century, the slag heap of the plant and the outlet of the Vesvre incline remain in situ.

Ravelon slag heap

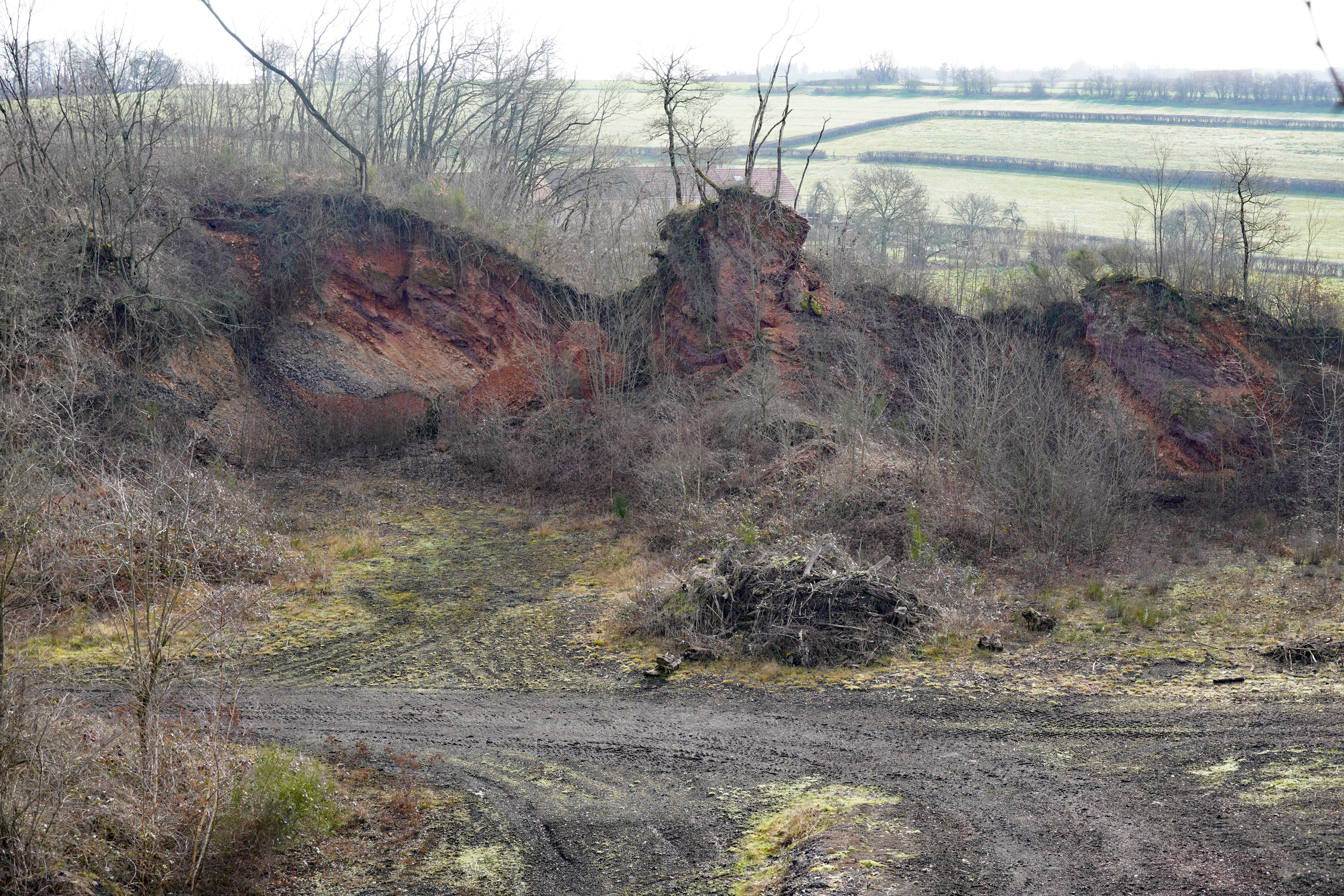
Overview.

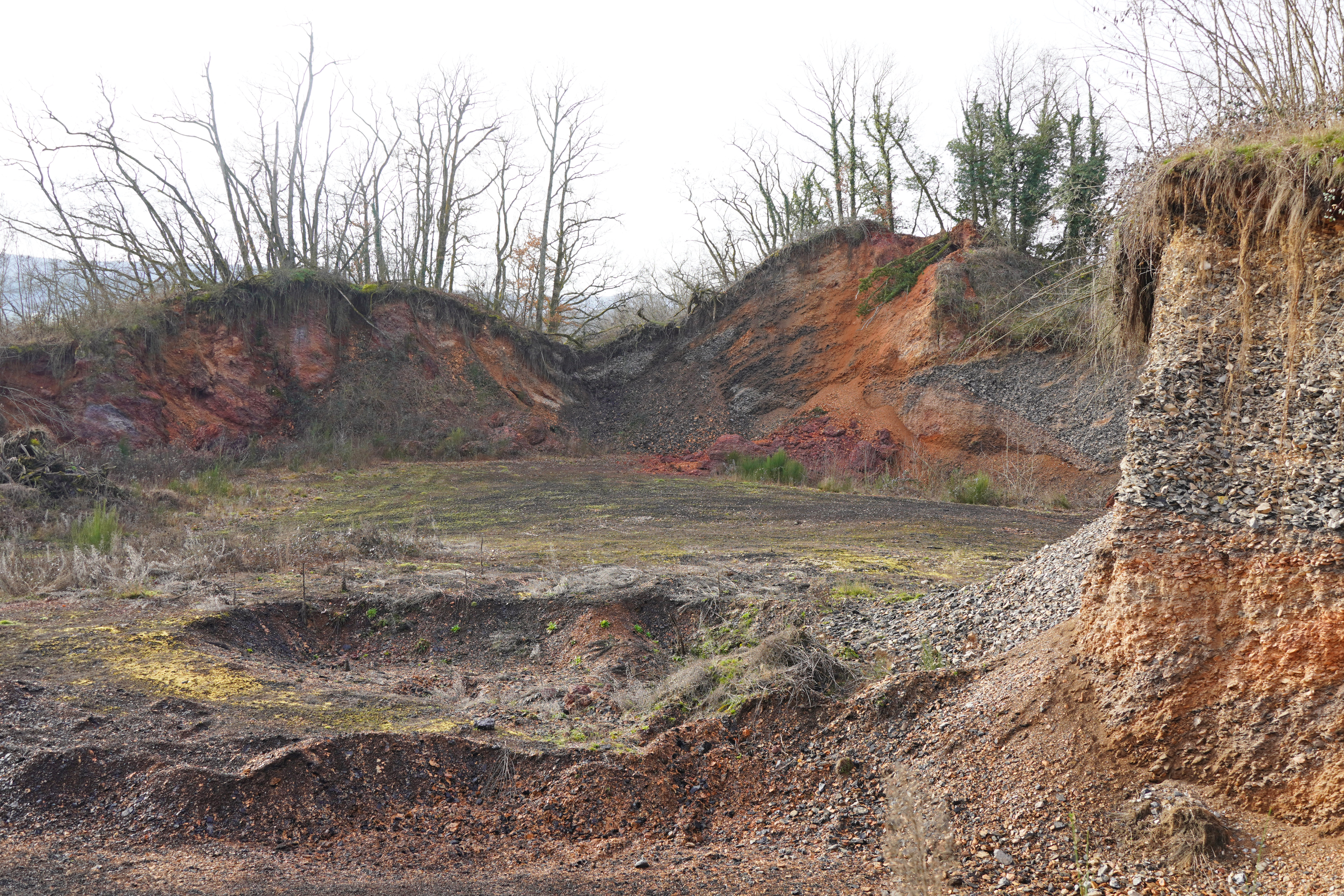

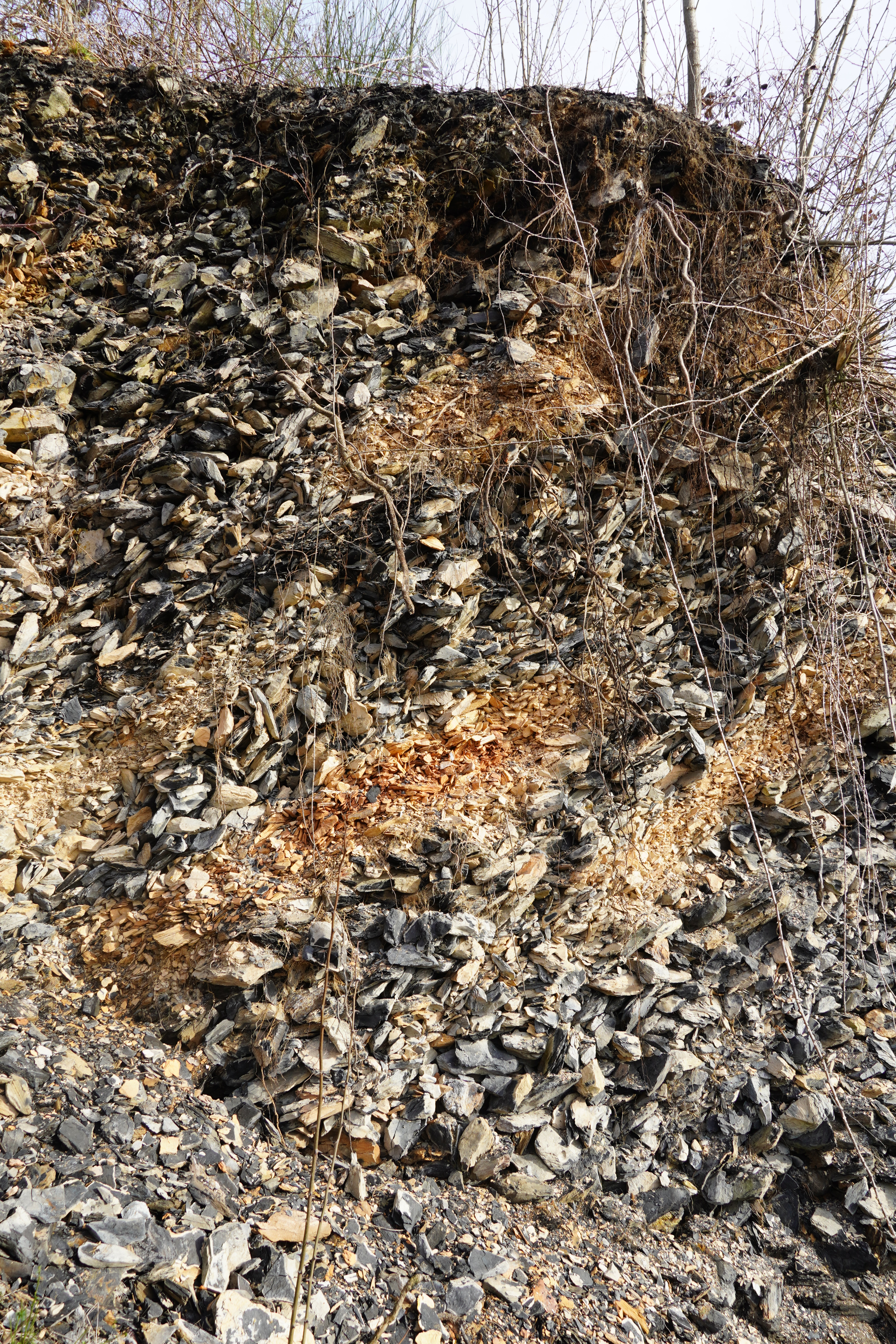
Rock detail.

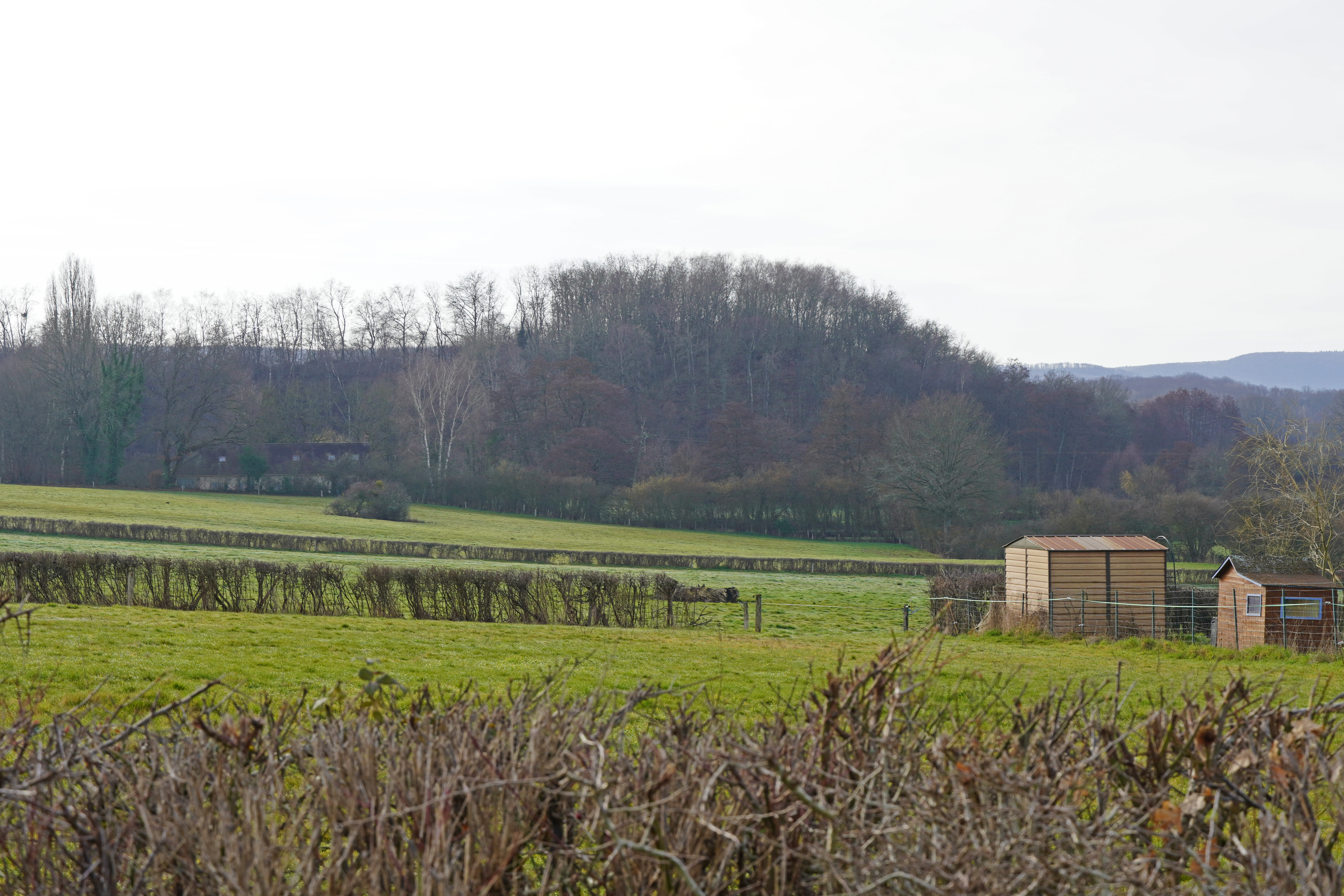
Distant view.

== Production and reserves ==
The total estimated production of the deposit is 13 million tons of oil shale.

In the early 1980s, studies conducted by Pascal Martaud for the BRGM revealed the existence of significant reserves, estimated to be between 20 and 30 million tons. The deposit covers an area of 240 km^{2}.

== See also ==
- Les Télots Mine
- Mining in France
- Oil reserves in France
- Unconventional (oil and gas) reservoir
- Shale oil
- Creveney shale mining operation
- Blanzy Mining Museum

== Bibliography ==
- Feys, R (1945). Puits et sondage dans le bassin d'Autun et Epinac, des origines à nos jours [Wells and boreholes in the Autun and Epinac basin, from the origins to the present day] (PDF) (in French). BRGM. Archived from the original on 12 April 2023.
- Passaqui, Jean-Philippe; Chabard, Dominique (2007). Les routes de l'énergie : Epinac, Autun, Morvan [Energy routes: Epinac, Autun, Morvan] (in French). Autun Natural History Museum.
- Passaqui, Jean-Philippe; Bellenfant, Sylvain (2010). Les Télots : une usine devenue friche industrielle aux portes d'Autun [Les Télots: a factory turned industrial wasteland on the outskirts of Autun] (PDF) (in French). Bourgogne-Nature. Archived from the original (PDF) on 21 August 2017.
- Gand, Georges (2010). Reprise de fouilles paléontologiques dans un gîte bourguignon célèbre : les « schistes bitumineux » de l'Autunien de Muse (Bassin d'Autun) : Bilan 2010 et perspectives [Resumption of paleontological excavations in a famous Burgundy deposit: the “bituminous schists” of the Muse Autunian (Autun Basin): 2010 report and outlook] (PDF) (in French). Bourgogne-Naturef. Archived from the original (PDF) on 10 August 2018.
- Le Goff, J (2013a). Etude des aléas miniers dans le bassin d'Autun, Bourgogne (71) (exploitations de houille, schistes bitumineux et fluorine) : Communes de Autun, Barnay, Cordesse, Curgy, Dracy-Saint-Loup, Igornay, La Celle en Morvan, Monthelon, La Grande Verrière, La Petite Verrière, Reclesne, Saint Forgeot, Saint Léger du Bois, Sully et Tavernay [Study of mining hazards in the Autun basin, Burgundy (71) (hard coal, bituminous shale and fluorite mining): Communes of Autun, Barnay, Cordesse, Curgy, Dracy-Saint-Loup, Igornay, La Celle en Morvan, Monthelon, La Grande Verrière, La Petite Verrière, Reclesne, Saint Forgeot, Saint Léger du Bois, Sully and Tavernay.] (in French). Vol. 1. Géoderis.
- Le Goff, J (2013b). Etude des aléas miniers dans le bassin d'Autun, Bourgogne (71) (exploitations de houille, schistes bitumineux et fluorine) : Communes de Autun, Barnay, Cordesse, Curgy, Dracy-Saint-Loup, Igornay, La Celle en Morvan, Monthelon, La Grande Verrière, La Petite Verrière, Reclesne, Saint Forgeot, Saint Léger du Bois, Sully et Tavernay [Study of mining hazards in the Autun basin, Burgundy (71) (hard coal, bituminous shale and fluorite mining): Communes of Autun, Barnay, Cordesse, Curgy, Dracy-Saint-Loup, Igornay, La Celle en Morvan, Monthelon, La Grande Verrière, La Petite Verrière, Reclesne, Saint Forgeot, Saint Léger du Bois, Sully and Tavernay.] (in French). Vol. 2. Géoderis.
- Le Goff, J (2013c). Etude des aléas miniers dans le bassin d'Autun, Bourgogne (71) (exploitations de houille, schistes bitumineux et fluorine) : Communes de Autun, Barnay, Cordesse, Curgy, Dracy-Saint-Loup, Igornay, La Celle en Morvan, Monthelon, La Grande Verrière, La Petite Verrière, Reclesne, Saint Forgeot, Saint Léger du Bois, Sully et Tavernay [Study of mining hazards in the Autun basin, Burgundy (71) (hard coal, bituminous shale and fluorite mining): Communes of Autun, Barnay, Cordesse, Curgy, Dracy-Saint-Loup, Igornay, La Celle en Morvan, Monthelon, La Grande Verrière, La Petite Verrière, Reclesne, Saint Forgeot, Saint Léger du Bois, Sully and Tavernay.] (in French). Vol. 3. Géoderis.
- Le Goff, J (2013d). Etude des aléas miniers dans le bassin d'Autun, Bourgogne (71) (exploitations de houille, schistes bitumineux et fluorine) : Communes de Autun, Barnay, Cordesse, Curgy, Dracy-Saint-Loup, Igornay, La Celle en Morvan, Monthelon, La Grande Verrière, La Petite Verrière, Reclesne, Saint Forgeot, Saint Léger du Bois, Sully et Tavernay [Study of mining hazards in the Autun basin, Burgundy (71) (hard coal, bituminous shale and fluorite mining): Communes of Autun, Barnay, Cordesse, Curgy, Dracy-Saint-Loup, Igornay, La Celle en Morvan, Monthelon, La Grande Verrière, La Petite Verrière, Reclesne, Saint Forgeot, Saint Léger du Bois, Sully and Tavernay.] (in French). Vol. 4. Géoderis.
