= Oil reserves in France =

In 2020, oil reserves in France were equivalent to 1% of its annual consumption. These reserves in the geological sense (extractable oil present in deposits) should not be confused with the strategic reserves of three months' full consumption, which can be used in the event of a serious international crisis. In fact, as a member of the International Energy Agency (IEA), France must maintain oil reserves equivalent to 90 days' net imports, corresponding in 2010 to around 17 million tonnes.

== Reserves and production ==
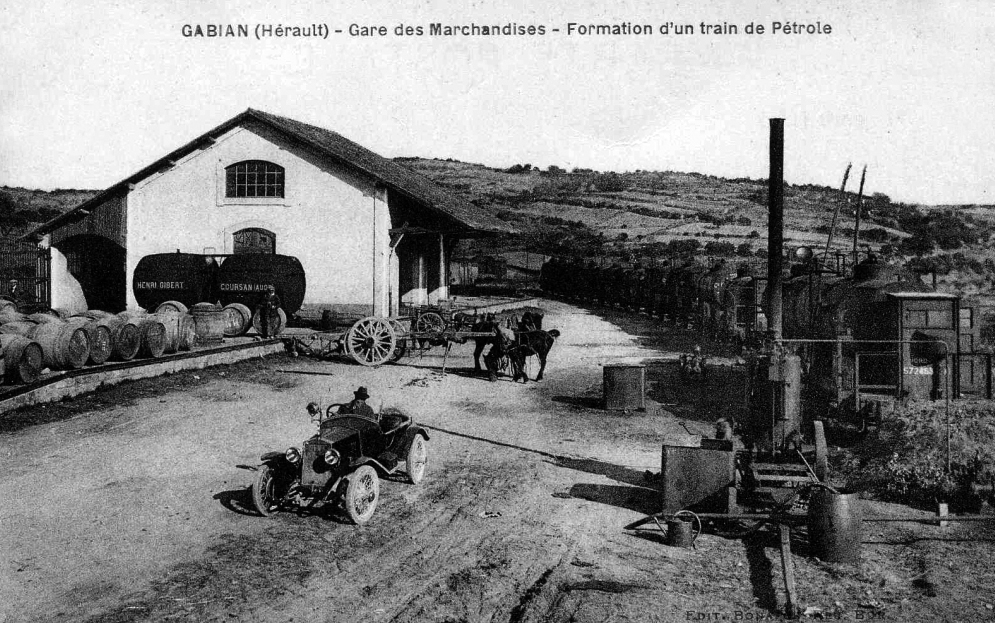
A train carrying oil in Gabian, Hérault, in the 1920s.

France's oil reserves are mainly distributed between the Paris Basin and the Aquitaine Basin.

In 1939 production in mainland France was around 50,000 tonnes, for a fuel consumption of three million tonnes.

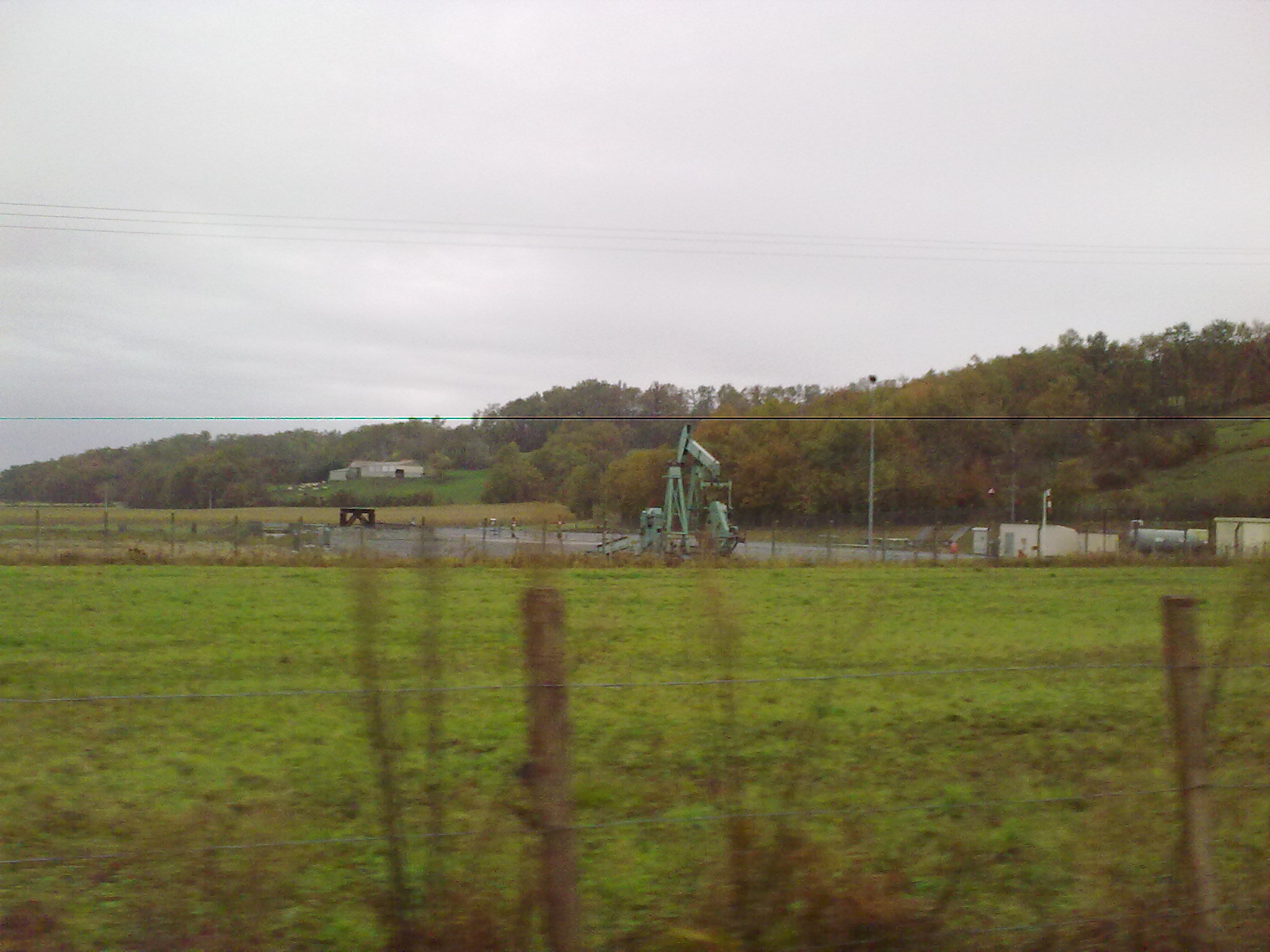
Oil well in the village of Burosse-Mendousse in the Pyrénées-Atlantiques region in the 2000s.

Between 1956 and 2017 the French government received more than 1,700 applications for exploration permits (applications for exclusive permits to explore for liquid or gaseous hydrocarbons) and granted more than 600. These led to the granting of 77 exploitation titles (concessions for liquid or gaseous hydrocarbons), mainly in the Paris Basin, the Aquitaine Basin and the Rhine Graben. During this period, France produced around 100 million tonnes of oil and 300 billion cubic metres of natural gas (245 Gm3 from the Lacq field alone, 56 Gm3 from Meillon). Some 4,000 exploration and production wells have been drilled.

In the 2000s, around 20,000 barrels of crude oil were extracted every day from the two regions (55% from Île-de-France and 45% from Aquitaine), representing 0.7 Mtoe by 2020. However, exploitable reserves are far greater than those exploited, due to the existence in the Paris Basin's subsoil of oil trapped in the Permian (end of the Primary Era) and Lias (middle of the Secondary Era). In 2016, this represented 815,000 tonnes of oil, or around 1 % of its consumption. These reserves represent 28 years of exploitation at the 2020 rate and three and a half months of national consumption.

The main producer at that date is the Canadian company Vermilion Energy, which has been operating in France since 1997, and at that date accounted for almost three-quarters of French production, i.e. 12,600 barrels a day at the start of 2016. At the beginning of 2017, the other main producers were Lundin Petroleum (Sweden), which during the year transferred its activities in France to a new company, International Petroleum Corporation, based in Canada, Geopétrol, Petrorep (the first company to discover commercially exploitable oil in the Paris Basin in 1958) and Société pétrolière production exploitation.

In the 2010s these activities generated annual direct and indirect sales of between €500 million and €1 billion, providing several thousand direct and indirect jobs in France and generating tax revenues of around €150 million a year. In 2014, the Union française des industries pétrolières estimated that "the total workforce in the para-oil and para-gas sector in France is 65,000, with 50 % of activities linked to hydrocarbon exploration and production".

In December 2017 a law was passed phasing out hydrocarbon exploration and production in France by 2040. As a result, no new hydrocarbon exploration permits can now be granted in France by the government. However, it is still possible to extend existing permits. No new exploitation permits may be granted either, unless the application is made during the period of validity of an existing exploration permit. Existing operating permits may not be extended beyond 2040, unless the company requesting the extension demonstrates that it has not covered its research costs by exploiting the deposit.

=== Oil reserves and production in the Paris Basin ===
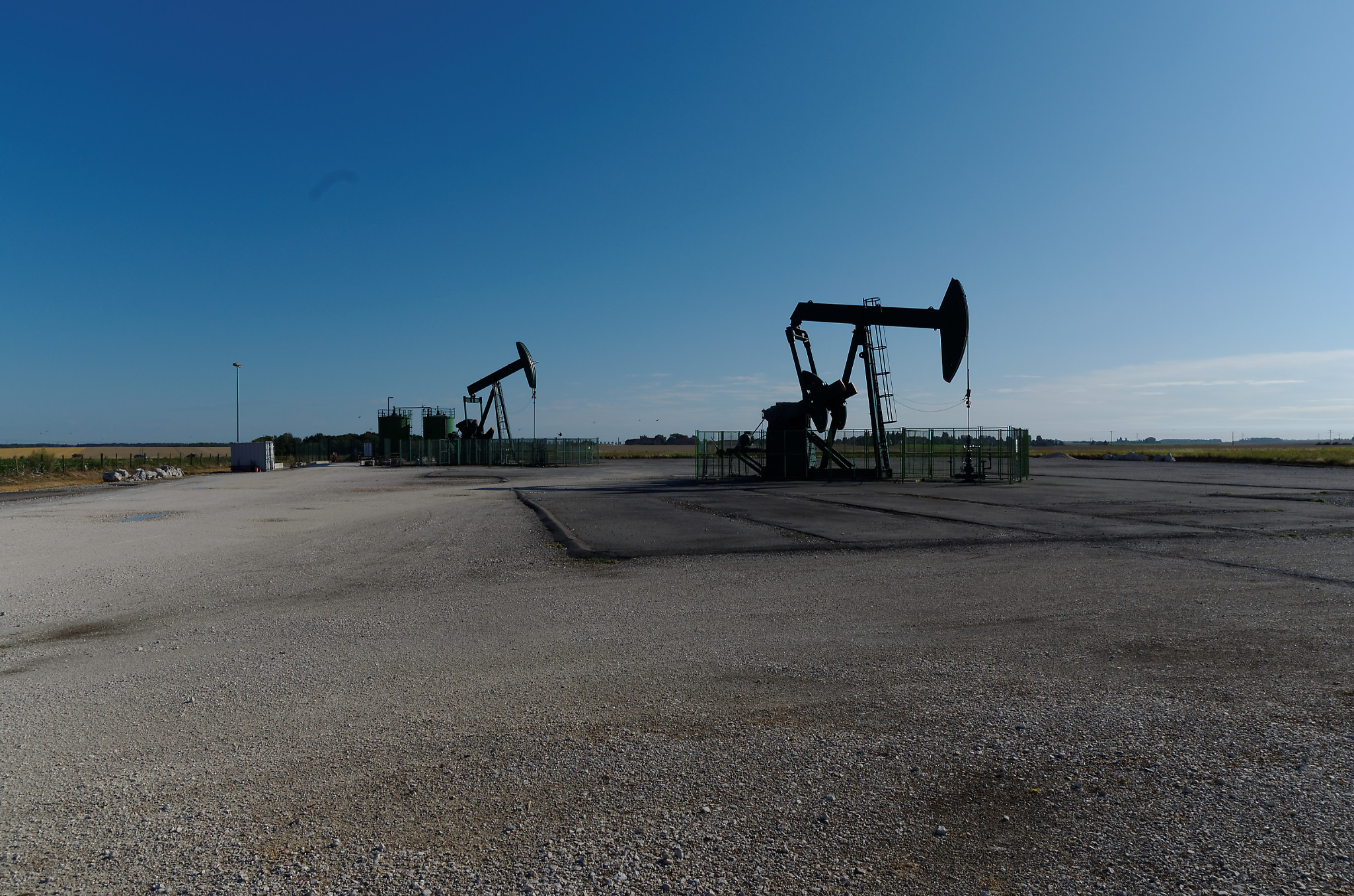
A pumpjack at Jouy-le-Châtel in Seine-et-Marne in 2013.

More than two thousand wells have already been drilled, and over 285 million barrels of oil were produced in the Paris Basin in 2011, out of a total reserve estimated at between 60 and 100 billion barrels.

But in the absence of new exploration, this production is gradually dwindling and is in danger of disappearing. The main deposits are Chaunoy, Itteville and Villeperdue.

Production in the Paris Basin dates back to the 1950s, when France set its sights on oil self-sufficiency and began a series of major research programs in the Seine-et-Marne region.

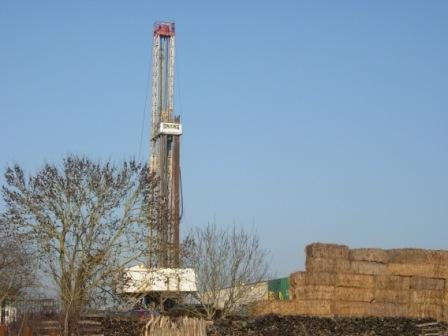
An oil well being drilled in 2009 at Saint-Martin-de-Bossenay, Aube department.

The first oil discovery was made on February 22, 1958, at 7:02 pm, at a depth of 1,875 m in the subsoil of the village of Coulommes.

This deposit has produced around two million tonnes of oil, but of the fifty-seven wells drilled on the concession since 1958, only four are still active in 2011.

Other discoveries followed in the 1960s. It was also during this period that Seine-et-Marne's only refinery, the Grandpuits refinery supplying Paris, was inaugurated in 1967 in the presence of then Prime Minister Georges Pompidou. Today, it still employs 400 people.

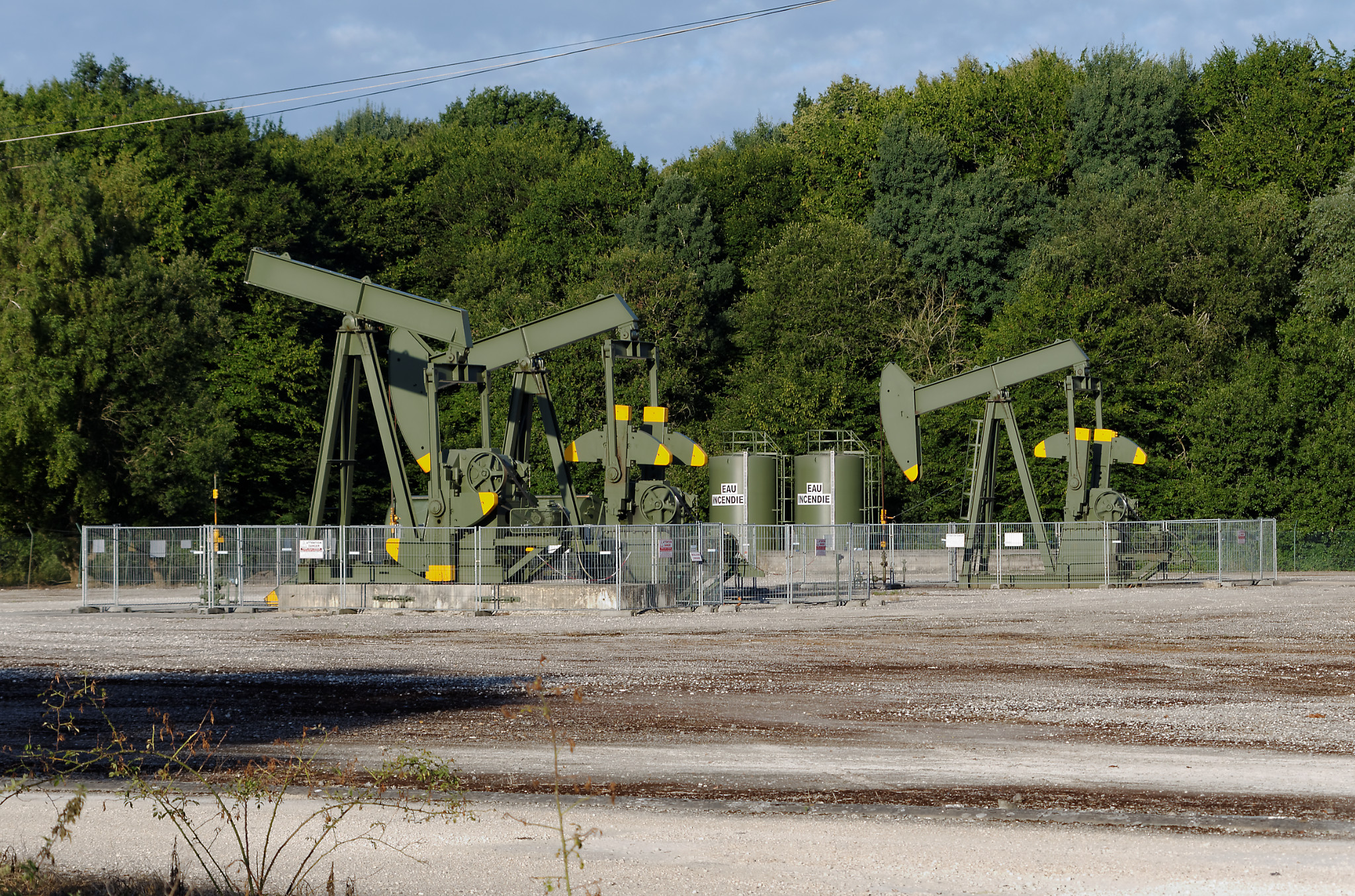
Pumpjack at Sivry-Courtry in Seine-et-Marne in 2013.

In 1982 and 1983, the Villeperdue and Chaunoy fields were discovered. The former by Triton (later operated by Total, then Coparex, which became Lundin in November 2002) and the latter by Esso. By the end of 2002, Chaunoy had produced a total of 9.8 Mt of oil and Villeperdue 5.8 Mt.

The last significant discovery was made by Elf in 1990 (Itteville). At that time, however, oil activity in the Paris Basin was poor, and no further significant discoveries had been made. In 1992, only nine wells were drilled, compared with 33 in 1991.

Several discoveries were made in the 1990s, and more recently in 2003–2004.

At the same time, however, a number of French wells were shut down and exploration suspended as the price of oil fell below nine dollars a barrel (the break-even point was 15 dollars a barrel).

With the price of a barrel of oil now at $100 in 2011, it is once again becoming economically viable to prospect in the Paris Basin.

The oil companies currently exploiting oil in the Paris Basin are seeking to make progress in two parallel areas: increasing extraction yields, which are currently only 25% per well, and continuing exploration.

=== Oil reserves and exploitation in the Aquitaine Basin ===
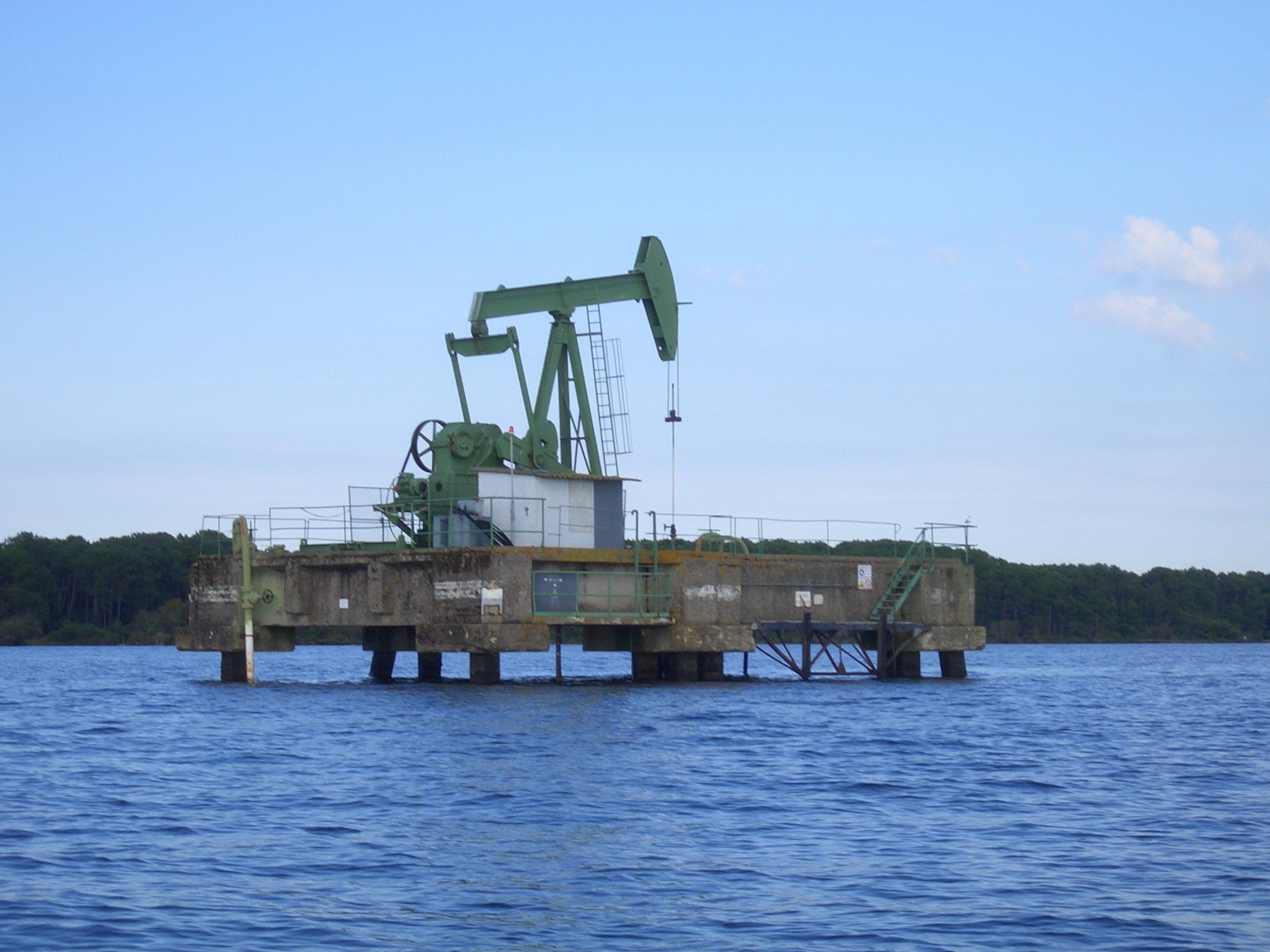
Pumping station on the Biscarrosse and Parentis ponds in the Nouvelle-Aquitaine region.

The three main oil fields in the Aquitaine Basin are Parentis, Cazaux and the Arcachon pool.

Following the discovery of oil in the village of Gabian (Hérault) in 1924, and that of Saint-Gaudens (Haute-Garonne) on July 14, 1939, France's largest oil field, Parentis-en-Born, was discovered by Esso on March 25, 1954.

Since then, around 20 deposits have been discovered in the Aquitaine Basin. Most of the activity is concentrated in the Adour–Arzacq sub-basin, which covers more than 6,000 km2, with 4.7 wells per 100 km2. The Parentis sub-basin, on the other hand, has a higher density of exploration drilling (around 8 wells/100 km2).

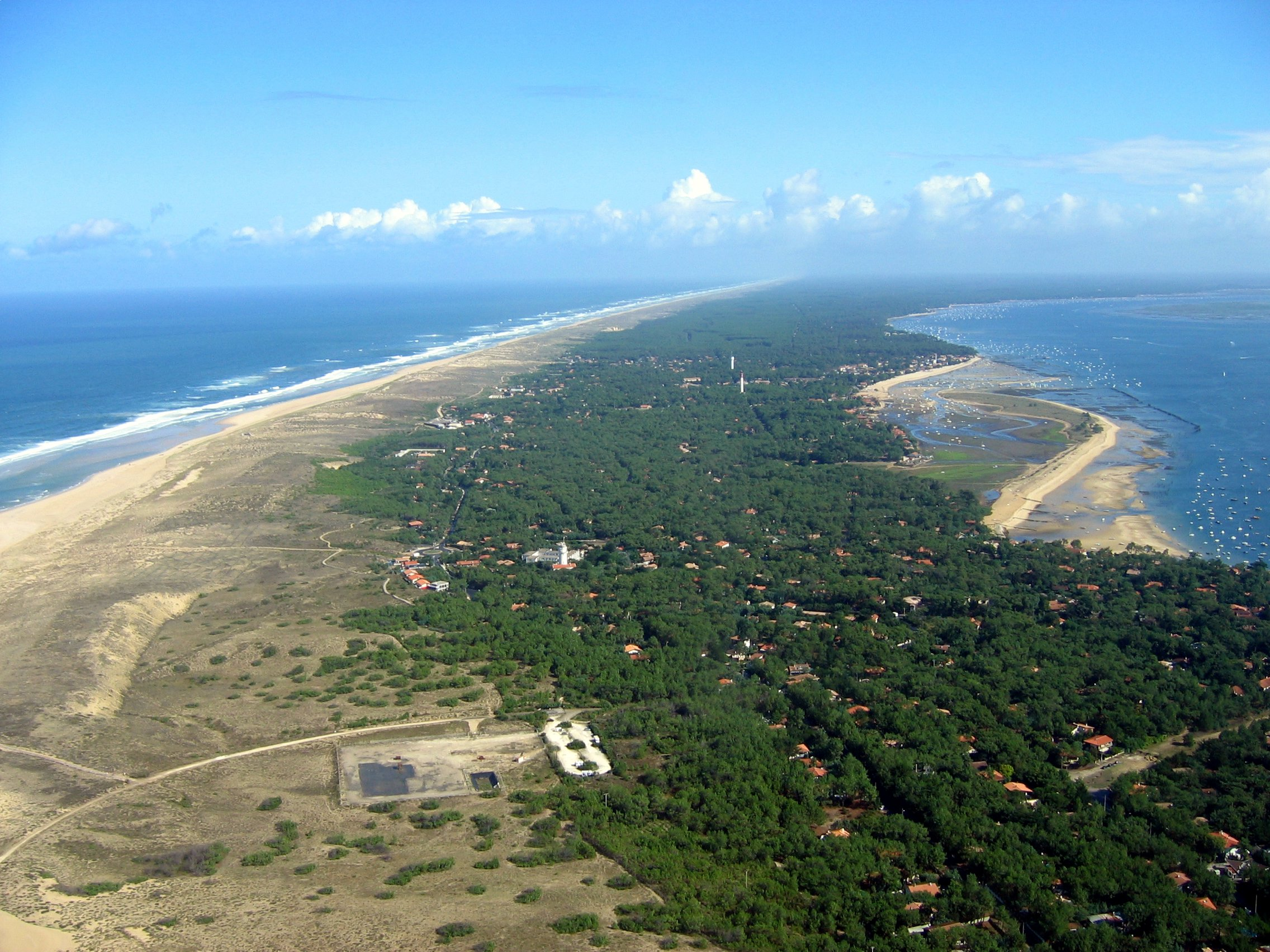
Vermilion facilities at Cap Ferret (foreground, "Lavergne" concession) in 2004.

On the Cap Ferret peninsula, wells are being drilled to tap an oil table at a depth of 3,200 m, part of the resources of the Aquitaine basin. The Cap Ferret well, opened in 1962, used a deviated borehole to tap the "Lavergne" deposit located under the sea between the Pointe and the Banc d'Arguin. It was shut down in 1994 by ESSO-Rep, an Exxon subsidiary and former operator, due to low flow rates. The well was moved further north due to erosion.

In 2010 the oil company Vermilion, which bought the oil fields from Esso, was authorized to re-exploit the "Lavergne" field in Cap Ferret until 2029, and to drill additional wells.

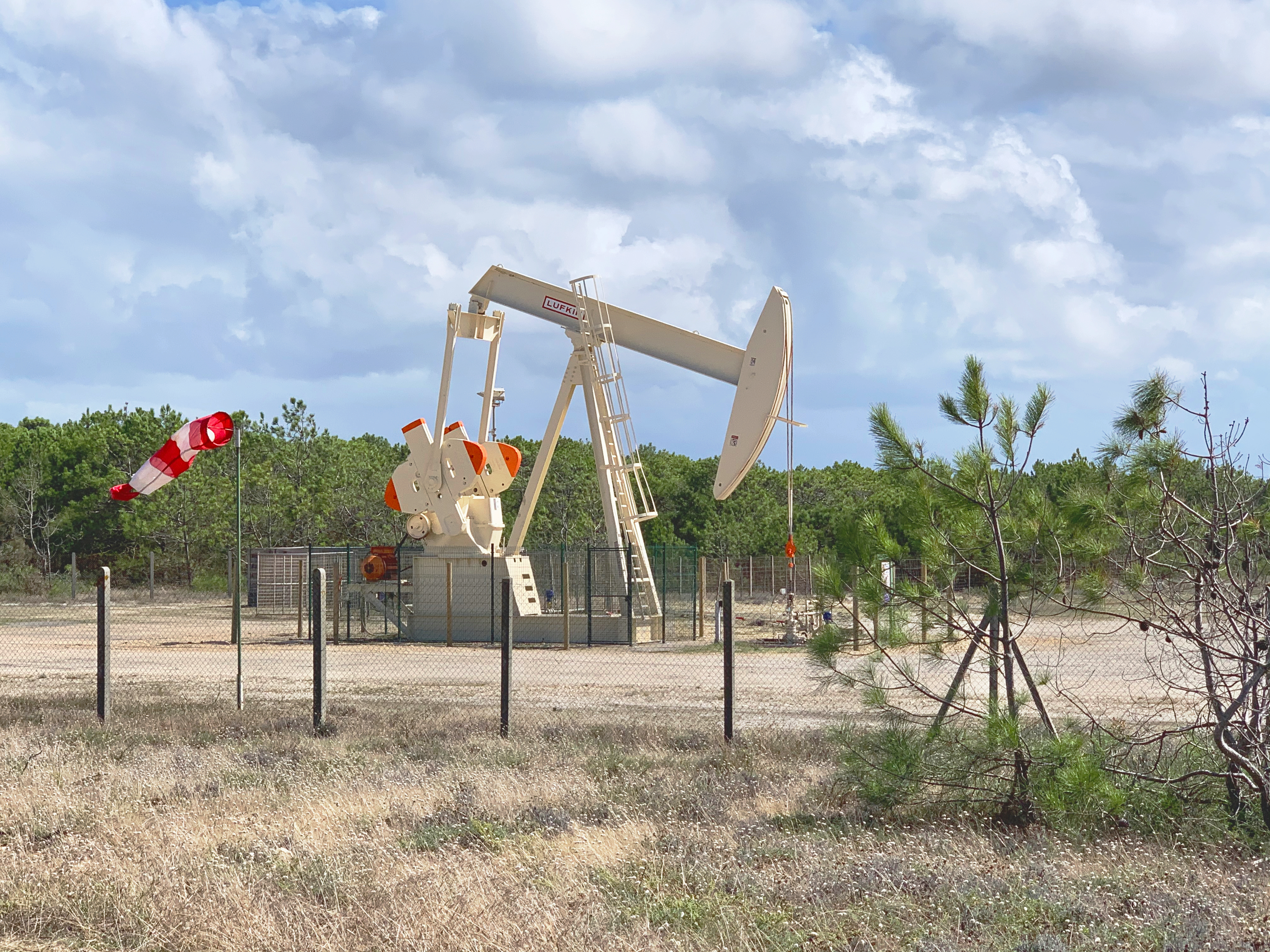
A Vermilion oil well in Cap-Ferret in 2020.

In 2023, Vermilion intends to increase the exploitation of its "Cazaux" concession in the La Teste forest by drilling additional wells. This project is incomprehensible to environmentalists in view of the announced 2040 deadline for the cessation of all hydrocarbon production in France.

The hydrocarbons are transported via a pipeline to the Bec d'Ambès.

=== Oil reserves and production in Alsace-Lorraine ===
Merkwiller-Pechelbronn, 50 kilometers from Strasbourg, was one of the first oil fields in the world to be exploited (using a system of underground galleries rather than boreholes), from the time it was founded in 1740 by Louis Pierre Ancillon de la Sablonnière until December 31, 1964, when it was finally shut down. At the time, the area was known as "Karichschmiermann land" (the land of the mineral grease merchant who sold this axle-lubricant with his wheelbarrow). It produced a total of 3.5 million tonnes of oil, almost 30 million barrels.

At its peak in the 1920s Alsatian crude production exceeded 70,000 tonnes a year, representing 7/8ths of French production and 5% of national requirements. As of 2014, thirteen wells, most of them recent, are in operation in Bas-Rhin, extracting 8,000 tonnes of crude a year, which are refined in Karlsruhe, Germany, since the closure of the Reichstett Refinery in January 2011.

The Sion Hill in Meurthe-et-Moselle was an oil production site at the end of the 20th century. About 13,698 tonnes of "light crude" quality were extracted from the Forcelles subsoil between May 27, 1983, and December 31, 1998.

=== Unconventional oil reserves and production ===
Shale oil is light oil contained in porous, low-permeability geological formations, often shale or sandstone. Some consider that it would be "more accurate to speak of 'bedrock' oil or gas, rather than 'shale'".

In France their production has been anecdotal. During the Creveney shale mining operation in the 1930s, 20,000 tonnes of shale were extracted, yielding 500 tonnes of crude oil, 90 tonnes of gasoline, 62 tonnes of refined gasoline, 25 tonnes of refined heavy gasoline, 36 tonnes of diesel, 135 tonnes of heavy oil and 220 tonnes of bitumen. By 1933, the plant was capable of producing 5,000 liters of crude oil per day, which in turn yielded 2,000 liters of gasoline. Industrial production took place mainly in the Autun area between 1824 and 1957, in particular at the Télots mine, which was equipped with a refinery as well as an oil distillation plant.

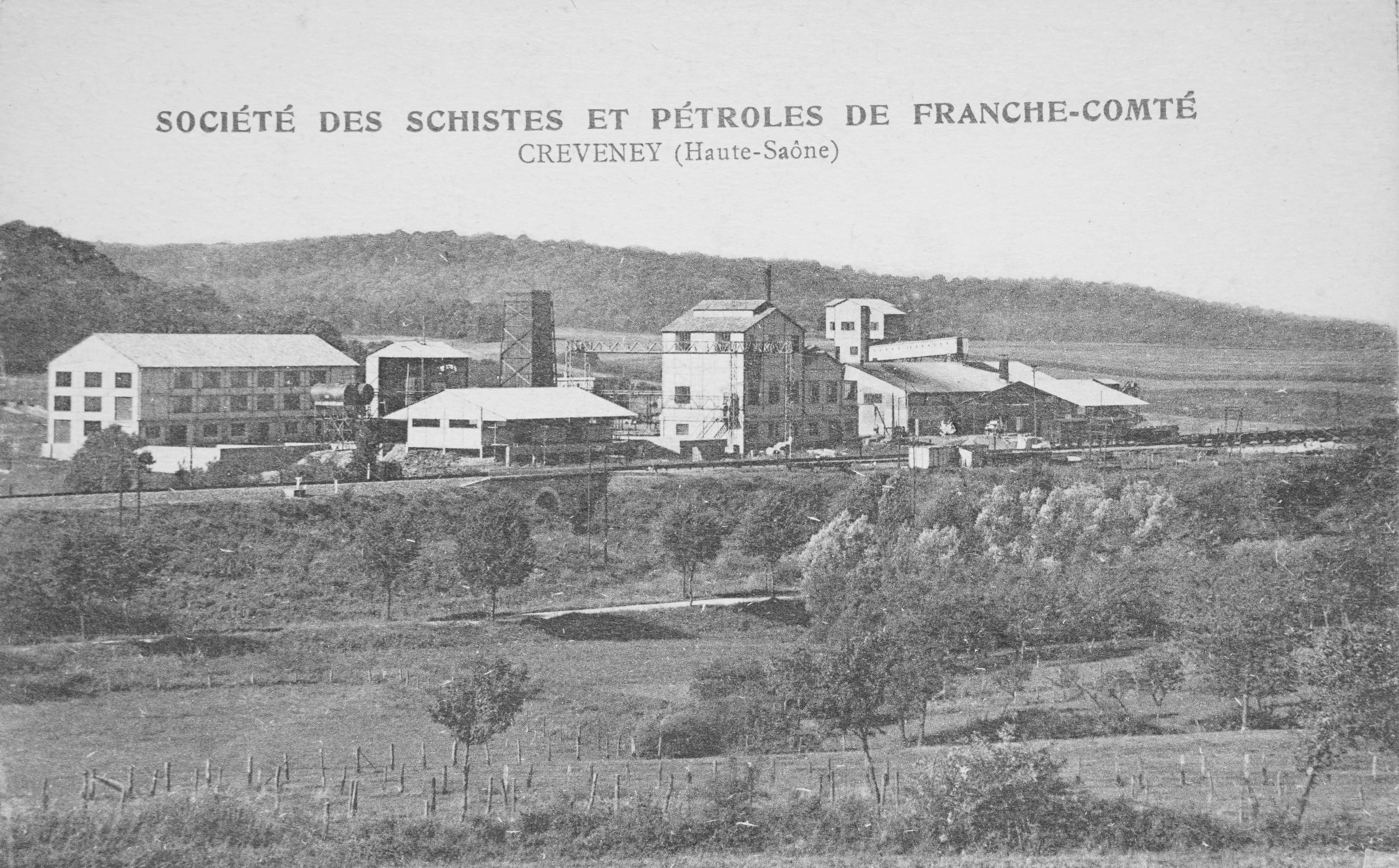
Shale mining at Creveney, Haute-Saône, in the 1930s.

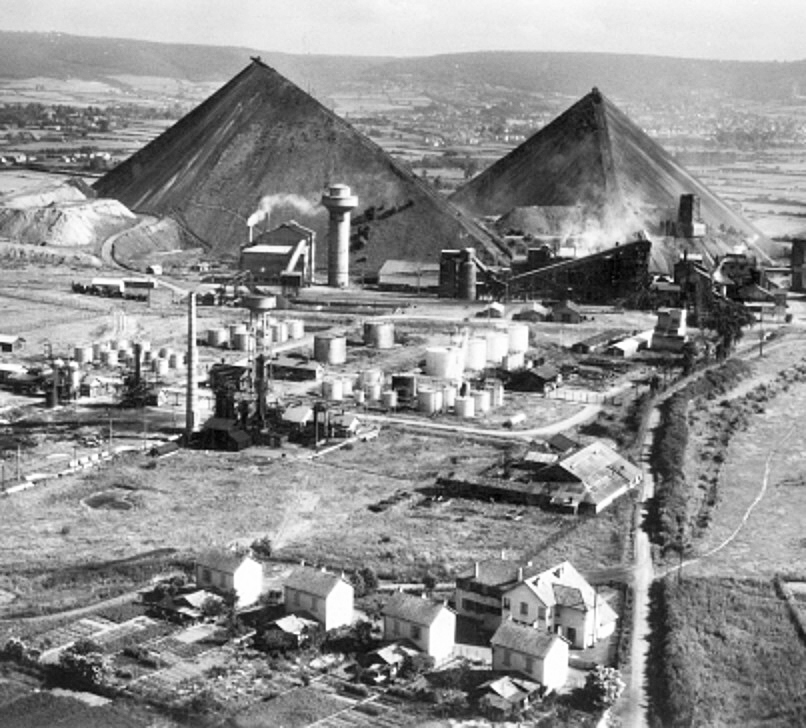
The Télots mine, near Autun, with its two conical slag heaps.

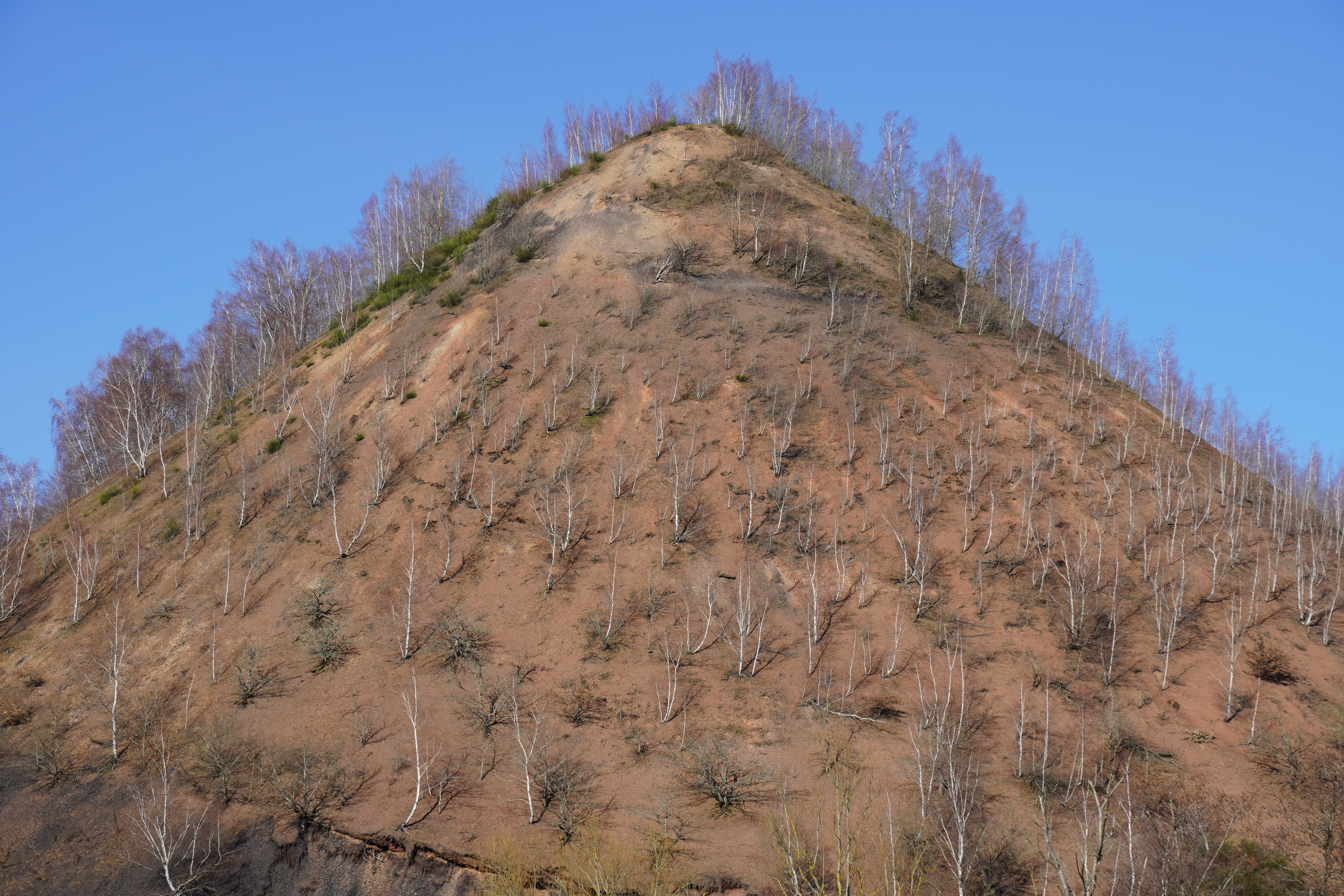
Detail of one of the two red shale slag heaps at Les Télots.

By 2010, 64 exploration permits had been issued for oil and gas, 15 of which were for unconventional hydrocarbons. In fact, according to an assessment by the EIA (U.S. Energy Information Administration), France and Poland are the European countries with the largest shale gas resources. The two basins potentially rich in shale hydrocarbons in France are the northeast and southeast quarters of the country.

In the south-west, under a prospecting permit granted by the French government in 2006, known as the "Permis de Foix", Canadian company Encana drilled two exploratory wells for shale gas in 2007, one year at Franquevielle and 4 months at Mérigon. The deposits were deemed insufficient for further exploitation. These prospective drillings, authorized by the French government with little information for local populations, contributed to the lively controversy over this type of fossil fuel and its extraction methods.

The law of July 13, 2011 repealed permits for projects involving the exploitation of reserves by hydraulic fracturing.

== In overseas territories ==
=== New discoveries ===
In September 2011 a consortium comprising Tullow Oil, Shell, Total and Northpet announced that it had found unconventional oil offshore Cayenne in French Guiana. This potential deposit is buried 150 kilometers northeast of Cayenne under more than 2,000 meters of water and 5,711 meters of rock below the seafloor. The well is called "Zaedyus".

The site was considered highly promising by oil analysts, and the French government estimated that, if the site's potential was confirmed, the discovery could have significant economic spin-offs.

In mid-2012 oil company Shell received authorization to start exploration drilling. The two subsequent drillings in December 2012 and April 2013 failed to confirm the presence of the reserves previously announced.

== Refining capacity ==
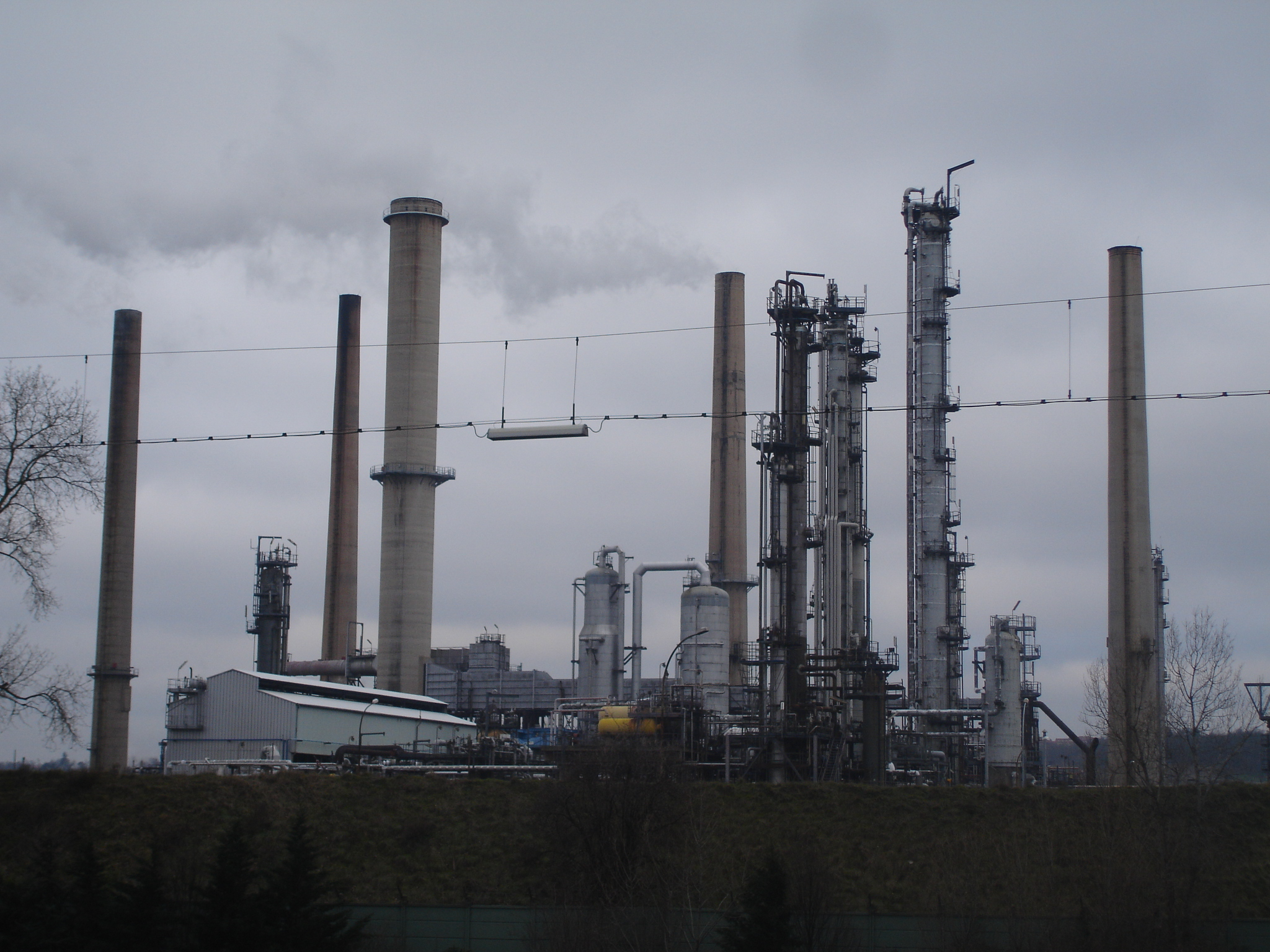
The Feyzin refinery.

In 1975 France had twenty-four refineries. In 2009, the number was twelve, with an annual refining capacity of less than 100 million tonnes. In 2011, there were eleven refineries in operation, ten of which are located in mainland France. In 2014, there are still eight sites in operation in mainland France, capable of refining 70 million tonnes a year.

In 2010 Total decided to close its Flandres refinery, and in 2011, a distillation unit at the Gonfreville refinery. In the same year, Petroplus announced the closure of its Reichstett refinery. In 2012, the Petit-Couronne refinery near Rouen and the Berre-l'Étang refinery also closed, and the Provence refinery ceased refining in 2016. By 2020–2030, public authorities and industry professionals believe that, given forecasts of falling consumption of petroleum products, one or two more refineries will close, in the absence of investments to boost their competitiveness and a rebalancing of demand for gasoline and diesel.

== See also ==
- Petroleum
- Oil and gas reserves and resource quantification
- North Sea oil
- Les Télots Mine
- Fracking
- Oil well
- Mining in France
- Creveney shale mining operation
