= Creveney shale mining operation =

Shale mining operation in Creveney, eastern region of France

Société des Schistes et Pétroles de Franche-Comté
- SPF logo.

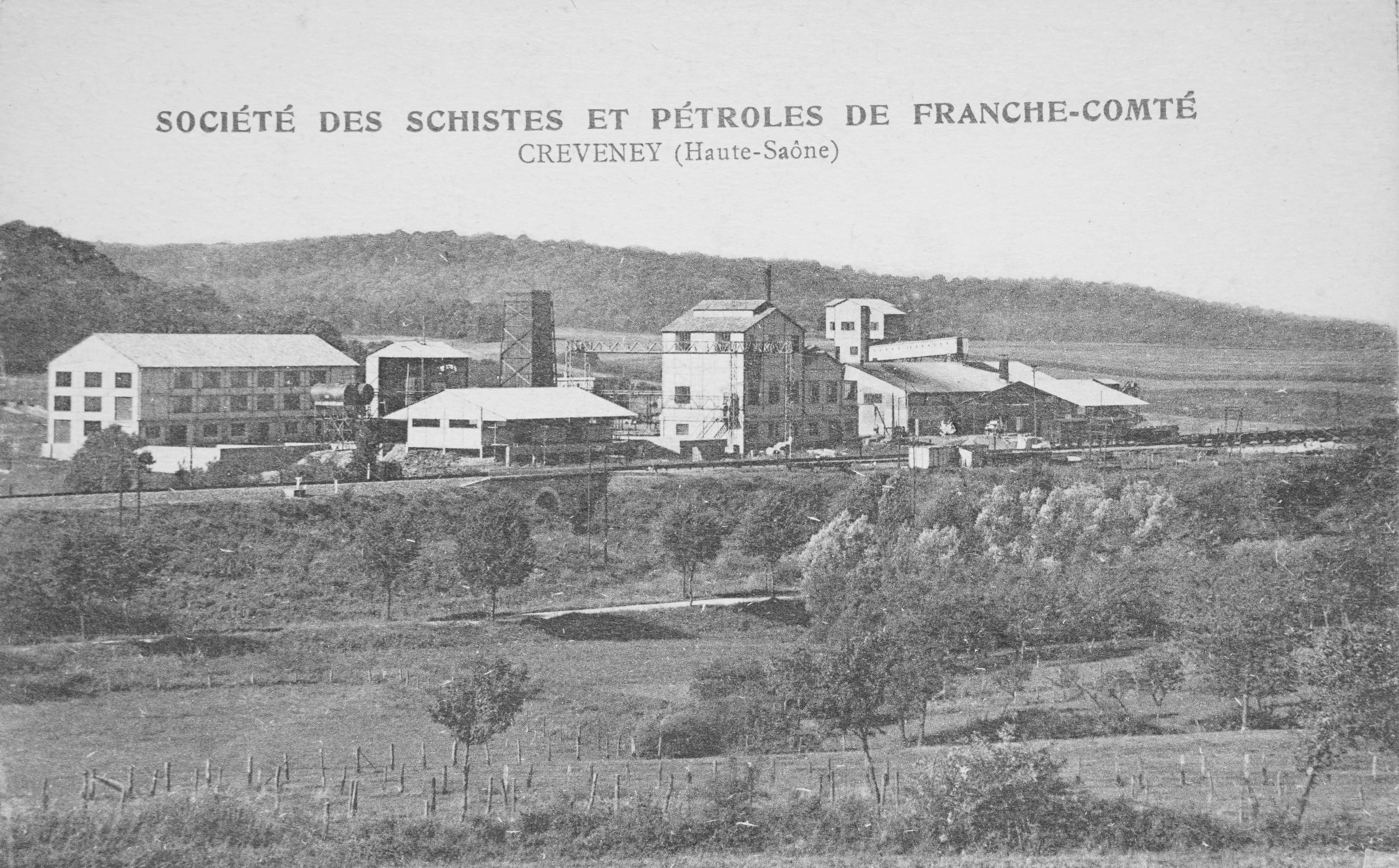
- The distillation plant.
- Company type: S.A. (corporation)
- Industry: Oil shale, Shale oil and by-products.
- Founded: 1929; 96 years ago
- Founder: René Petit
- Defunct: 1936
- Fate: Dissolution
- Headquarters: Creveney, France
- Key people: René Petit
- Number of employees: 7

The Creveney shale mining operation, managed by Société des Schistes et Pétroles de Franche-Comté (SPF) for the manufacture of the fuel known as Natioline, comprises an open-pit oil shale mine and an oil distillation plant. It is located at Creveney, in the Haute-Saône region of eastern France.

Between 1929 and 1936, this industry mined 20,000 tons of pyro schist of the Toarcian age, with industrial production in 1934 employing around 80 people. This rock is distilled to obtain shale oil, which is then refined. To promote this fuel, Natioline, a car raid was organized in the French colonies, the “African technical cruise."

At the beginning of the 21st century, some (polluted) remnants of the installations and the extraction area remain, but the most important will be demolished before 2022.

== Situation ==
The 1,760-hectare concession covers the whole of Creveney and parts of neighboring Saulx, Châtenois, Colombotte, Calmoutier, Montcey, and Colombier. It is located between Vesoul and Lure in the Haute-Saône department, in the Bourgogne-Franche-Comté region.

Red lines: concession boundary;: shale mine;: distillation and refining plant.

== Geology ==
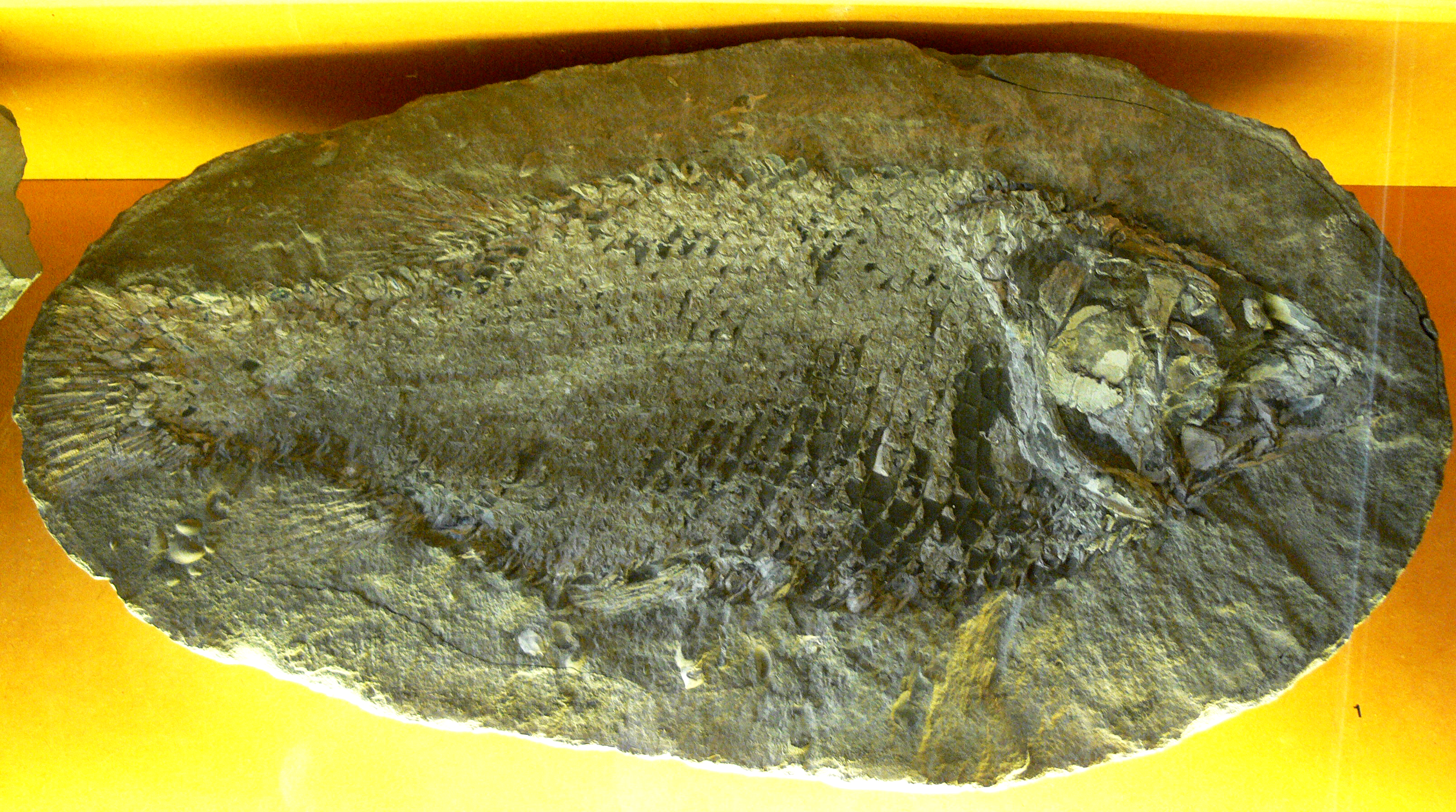
Lepidotes elvensis found in 1883 in the Saulx schists.

The Creveney concession exploits a small part of a vast oil shale deposit comprising two main groups. The first of these is located in the center of the Haute-Saône department, in the synclinal valleys of the Ognon and Saône rivers, and extends from Grattery to Gouhenans via Vesoul and Creveney, where it outcrops at various points. The second is located in the south-east of the department, on the north-western slopes of the pre-Jurassic hills, and extends from Châlonvillars to Fallon. Some fifty communes are affected, representing 10% of the department's territory. The thickness of the layer is generally around twenty meters, with a maximum of 34 meters.

Map of the communes of Haute-Saône, showing the extent of the deposit in black and the Creveney concession in red.

This pyro schist deposit, known as “schists-carton,” dates back to the Toarcian (-182 to -174 million years); more specifically, to the Lower Toarcian, a period during which a major geological event known as the Oceanic Anoxic Event (OEA) took place. This corresponds to a period of global warming that destabilized methane hydrates in seabed sediments, releasing large quantities of methane gas and causing seabed anoxia over a large part of the globe. The result is mass extinctions of ocean fauna and the accumulation of organic matter. The absence of benthic and burrowing organisms preserves the original sediment laminae. Black clays with a laminated structure and a cardboard-like consistency, known as cardboard schists, are formed. This facies is known from outcrops and boreholes in many basins, including the Paris and Aquitaine Basins, where it is only a few meters thick. Cardboard shales contain only fossils of pelagic organisms (fish, microalgae including Coccolithophoridae, etc.). The duration of this event is estimated at 600,000 years.

The volume of mineable material in the concession alone is estimated at one billion tons of shale capable of producing 50 million tons of oil (a yield of 5%). The exploited layer measures 15 meters on average. It slopes slightly to the south and extends between Colombier and Velleminfroy.

== History ==
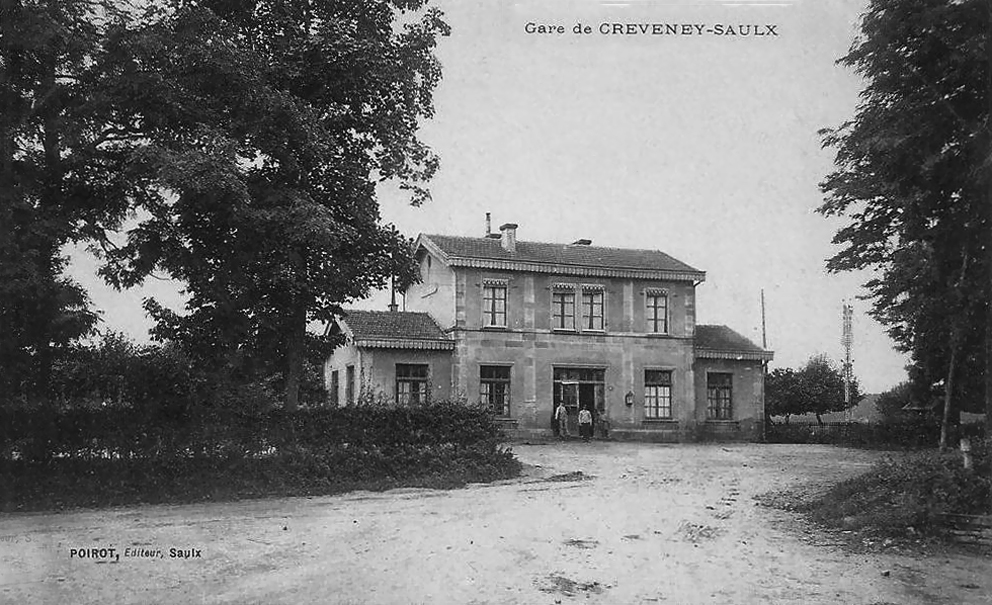
Creveney-Saulx station in the early 1900s.

The deposit was discovered in the mid-19th century, and in 1849 a concession application was filed by Vésul merchants to mine the Saulx-Creveney sector. The application was refused by the Prefect of Haute-Saône, the mining engineer deeming the schist deposit insufficient and fearing stock market speculation.

The concession was granted in 1929. In October, the Société des Schistes et Pétroles de Franche-Comté was created by René Petit, an industrialist from Luxeuil-les-Bains. A special branch line was created with the Creveney-Saulx railway station for the transport of refined products, also via RN 19 and RN 57. The plant was built in 1930 and went into production in 1934.

Operations ceased in November 1934 due to a lack of capital. The business was relaunched in March 1935 during a visit by Marshal Pétain, but on June 6 the company filed for bankruptcy again. The business was relaunched in July 1936, and the facilities were bought by the Pechelbronn oil company, which quickly dismantled them before abandoning the site.

== Extraction ==
To mine the deposit, the topsoil is scraped away to reveal the shale, which is then blasted. Excavators are used to load the rock into minecarts pulled by Decauville locomotives. Mining waste is used to backfill the open-cast mine.

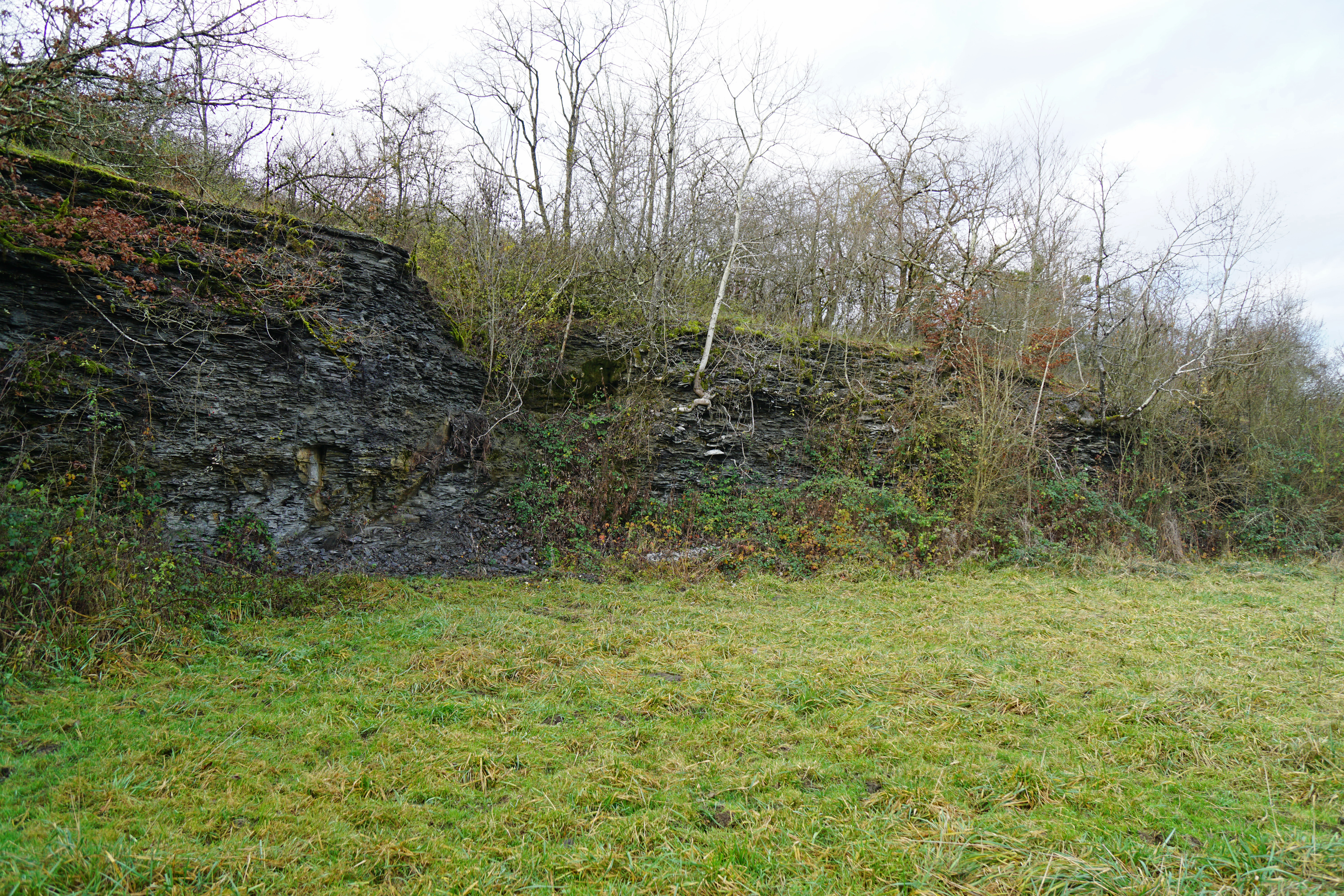
The working face.

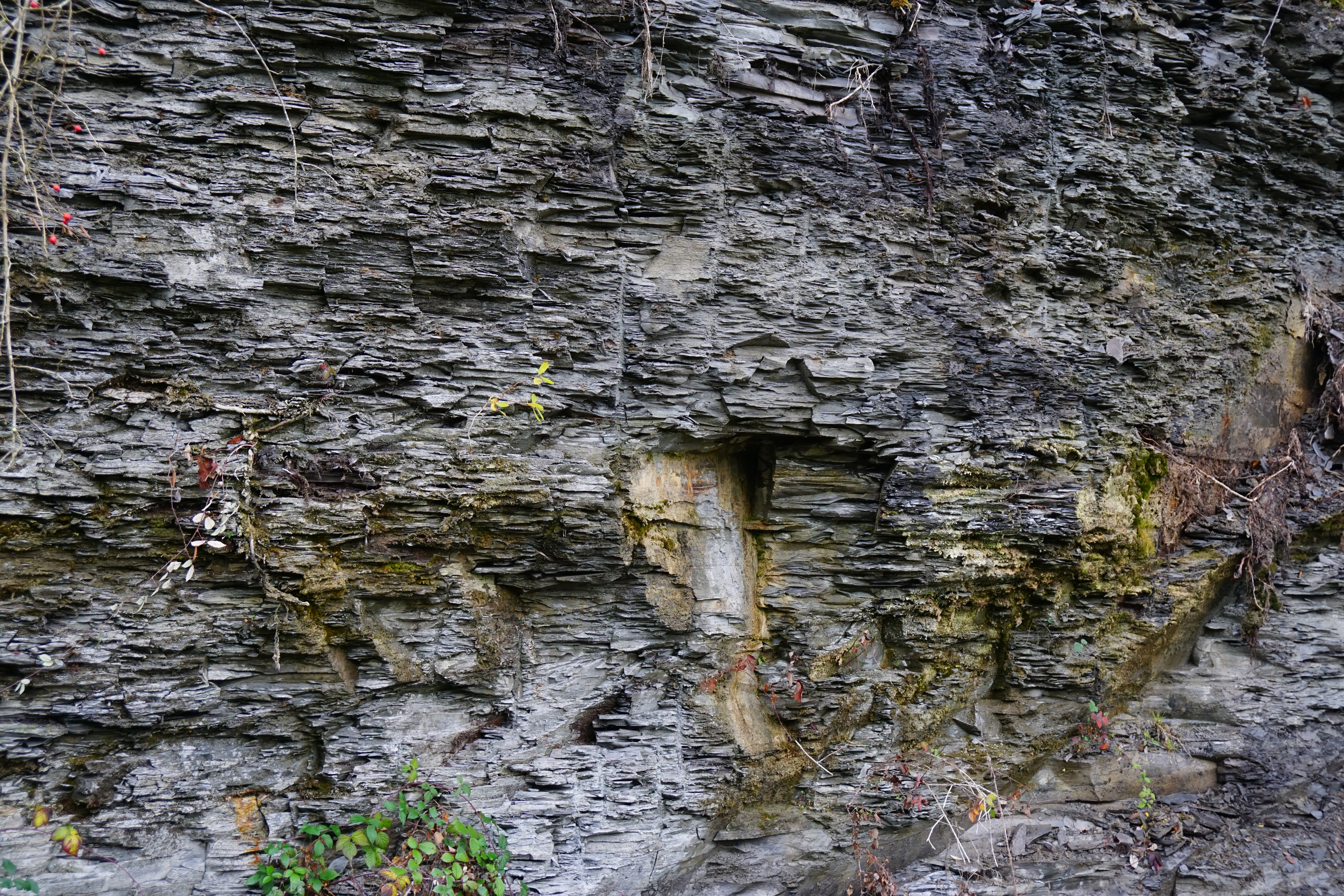
Close-up view.

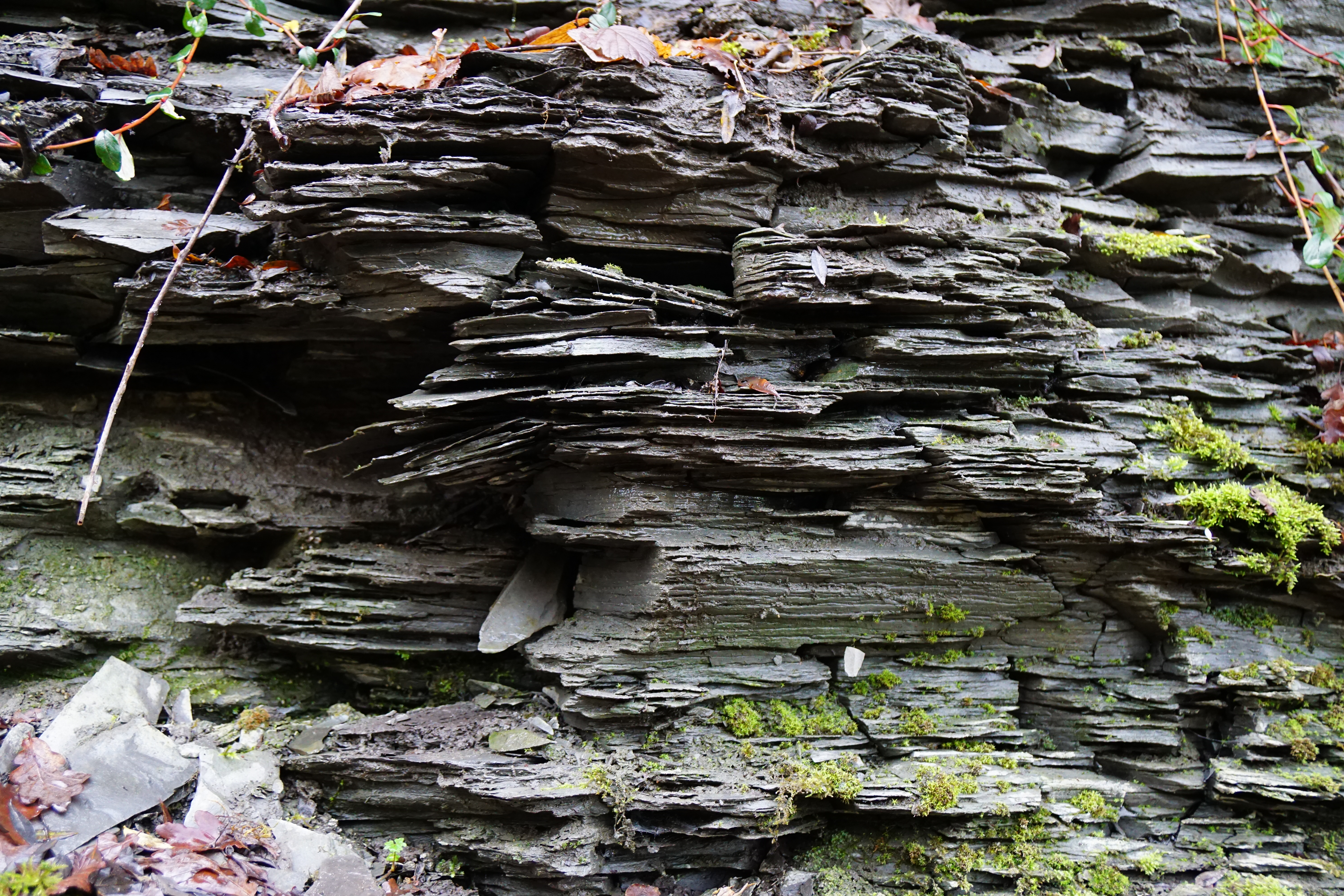
Detail of the schist sheets.

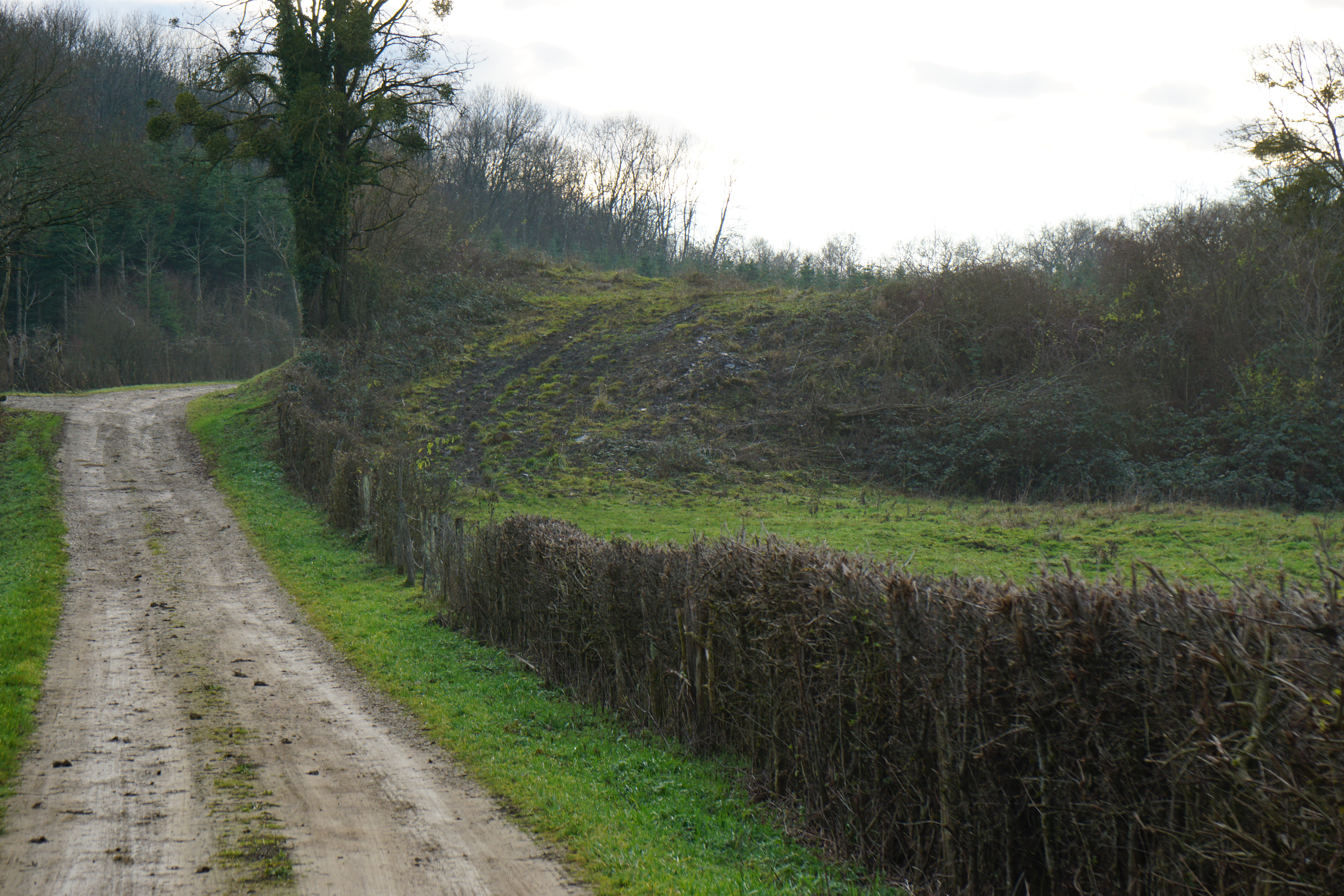
The slag heap.

== Treatment ==
Production process diagram.

The extracted materials are first broken with a sledgehammer (1), then pass through mechanical hammers (2) before being crushed in two cylindrical crushers (3) to achieve a grain size of 15 mm. The fine material is then screened to separate dust (4) before being stored in a drying silo (5), which feeds different types of furnaces where it is heated between 450 and 500 °C in a confined, oxygen-free environment.

The Pumpherston retort (6), measuring one meter in diameter and built from cast iron and refractory bricks, stands 18 meters high and processes 3 to 5 cubic meters every thirty hours. A horizontal rotary kiln (7), a continuous mechanical type made of steel, can process 12 cubic meters per day. There is also a gasifier furnace (8) and another furnace designed specifically by René Petit (9), capable of processing 4 tons per hour.

The shale oil obtained by vapor condensation at the furnace exit undergoes a three-phase distillation process. Heating (10) extracts gas oil and crude gasoline. The gasoline then passes through a distillation column (11), producing various refined products. Residues are processed in a tar boiler (12) to produce bitumen, used for road construction. A final refining step removes sulfur and phenol.

Since the processing facilities require large amounts of water, gas, and electricity, they have water supply system and are self-sufficient in gas through their furnaces. However, the electricity supplied by the Ronchamp thermal power plant is insufficient. To compensate, the plant operates its own thermal power station with a capacity of approximately 300 kW. Steam is generated by a semi-tubular boiler to drive the turbine, which powers the electric generator. The equipment is manufactured by Alstom in Belfort. In case of failure, a locomobile can operate a backup generator.

Plan of the Creveney shale mine: 1: Cutting face 2: Earthworks 3: Silo 4: Furnace building 5: Refining building 6: Power station 7: Hangar 8: Passenger building

== Production ==
A total of 20,000 tons of shale were extracted, yielding 500 tons of shale oil, 90 tons of gasoline, 62 tons of refined gasoline, 25 tons of refined heavy gasoline, 36 tons of diesel, 135 tons of fuel oil, and 220 tons of bitumen. By 1933, the plant was capable of producing 5,000 liters of crude oil per day, which yielded 2,000 liters of gasoline.

== Natioline ==
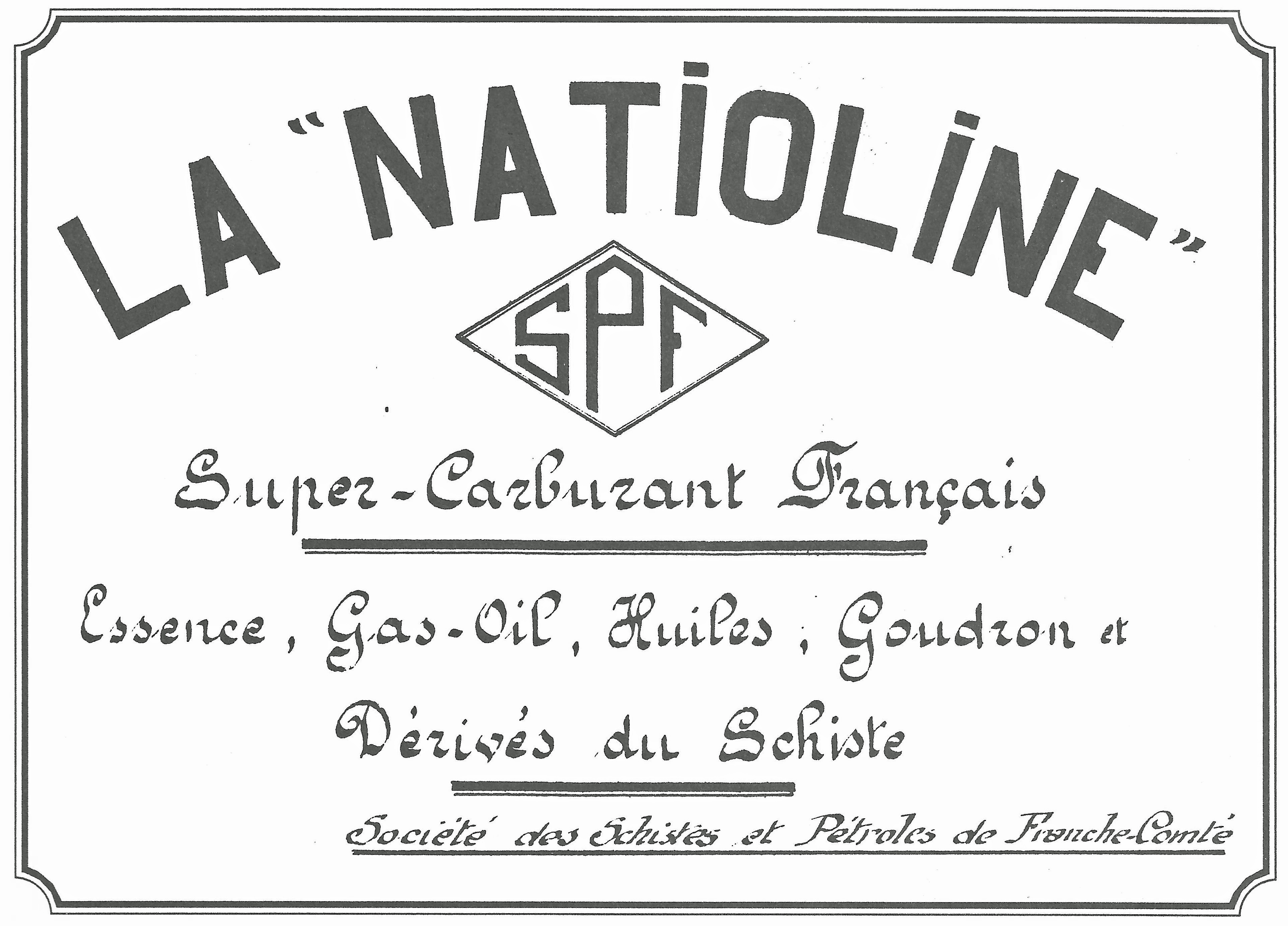
Logos of Natioline and the Franche-Comté Schist and Petroleum Company on an advertising insert.

The fuel produced at Creveney was marketed in drums bearing the colors of the French flag, under the name Natioline, a marketing strategy linked to the economic patriotism of the time. In 1934, management decided to organize an “African technical cruise,” an automobile raid in the French colonies similar to the Yellow Expedition organized by Citroën. The expedition was led by Charles Roux. The convoy made up of two trucks, refuels at the Creveney factory before setting off for Algeria, crossing the Sahara to the French West Africa, then the French Equatorial Africa, and finally returning to France via Senegal and Morocco. The results are positive: the convoy suffers only a few breakdowns, not attributable to fuel.

Autonomy tests were carried out with Renault military liaison vehicles, as well as with a Citroën C6F, to compare the difference in distance covered by the car with 5 liters of Natioline and 5 liters of conventional petrol. The range covered by Natioline was 39 km, compared with 34 km for ordinary petrol. Creveney gasoline is blended with denatured alcohol to maintain fuel stability down to -21°C.

== Corporate aspects ==
The Board of Directors is made up of seven members, including Albert Bikel (Chairman) and René Petit (Founder and Managing Director).

The company employs around 80 people: a head of technical services, a mining engineer, a secretary, a draughtsman, two excavator drivers, two assistants, a hooker, a locomotive driver, a driller and his assistant, 5 backfillers, a porter from Ronchamp mines, seven crusher workers, three furnace shifts (a department manager, two shift supervisors, six maintenance workers and two laborers), a refinery engineer, two foremen, three men per shift with the department manager, a power station manager, six plant workers, four maintenance workers, two laboratory workers and a storekeeper.

Employees work 8 hours a day, 48 hours a week. Several workers play together in the Creveney-Saulx soccer club on Sundays.

== Reconversion ==
At the beginning of the 21st century, the remains of the open-cast mine, a reinforced concrete silo, a metal reservoir, furnace foundations, and scattered concrete blocks remained. The site was used by the Direction Départementale de l'Équipement (DDE - Departmental Equipment Directorate) until its demise in 2009.

In 2013, the site was acquired by the Direction Départementale des Territoires (DDT - Departmental Directorate of Territories) of Haute-Saône. The Direction régionale de l'environnement, de l'aménagement et du logement (DREAL - Regional Directorate for the Environment, Planning and Housing) then carried out a study into soil pollution and site safety. Traces of hydrocarbons, in particular PAHs, were found in the soil, but as the latter was impermeable, there was no risk of contamination of the water table or watercourses. The risk is linked to possible leakage and runoff of these pollutants via the Bognon stream, the natural outlet for runoff from the Durgeon watershed. A fence is erected to prevent access to the site.

The ruins of the facilities in 2015

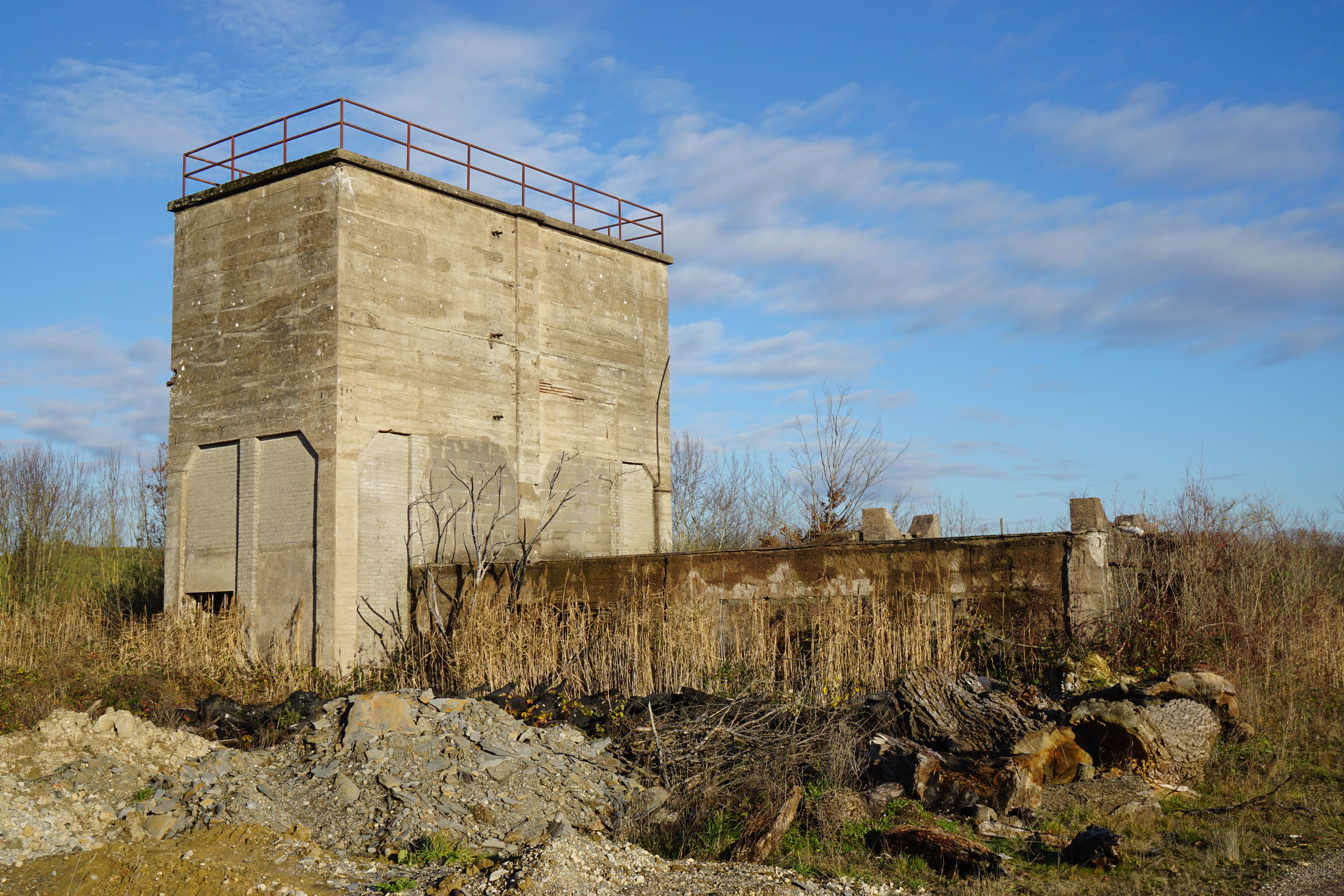
The double-silo storage tower.

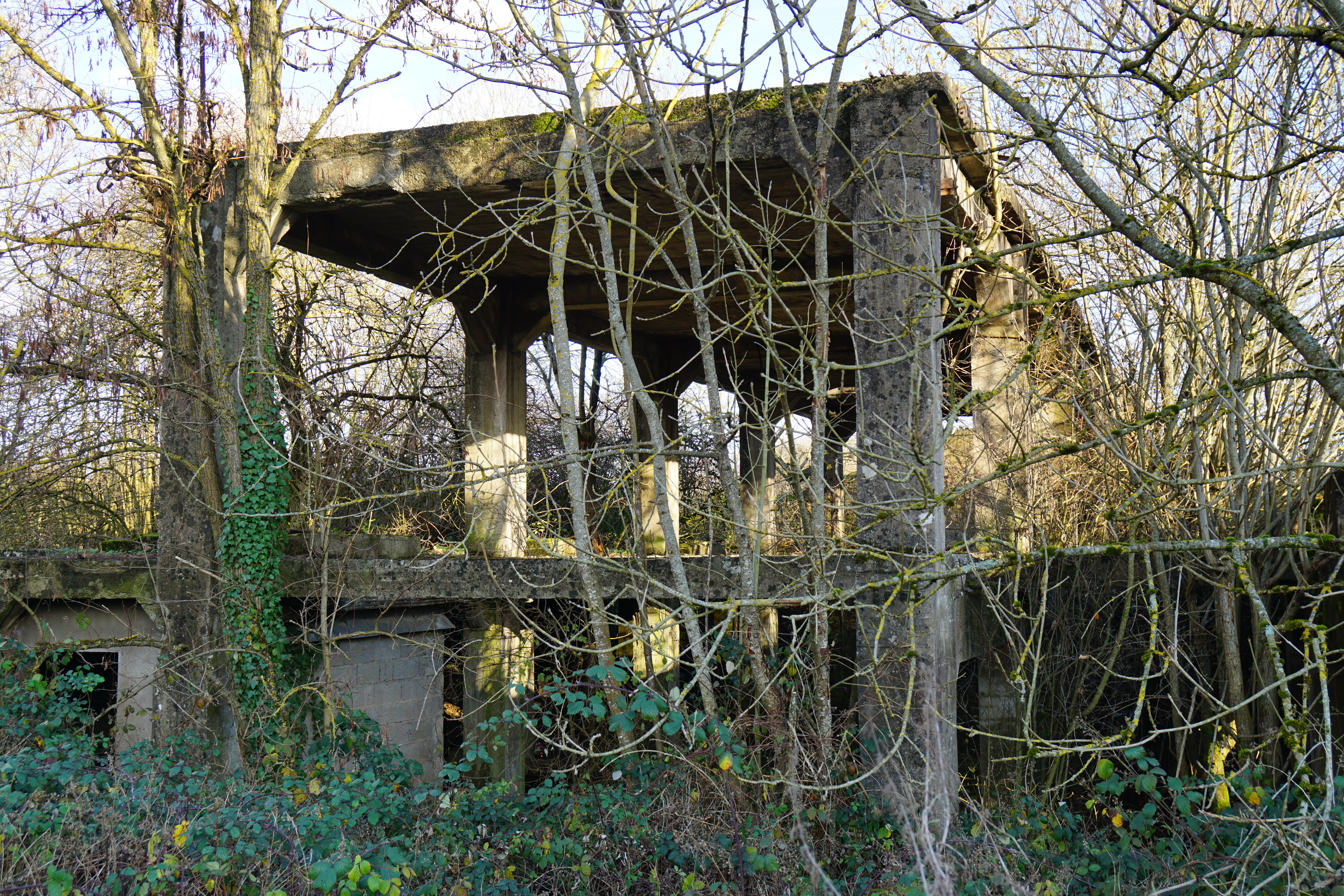
Ruin of the oven building, neighbor.

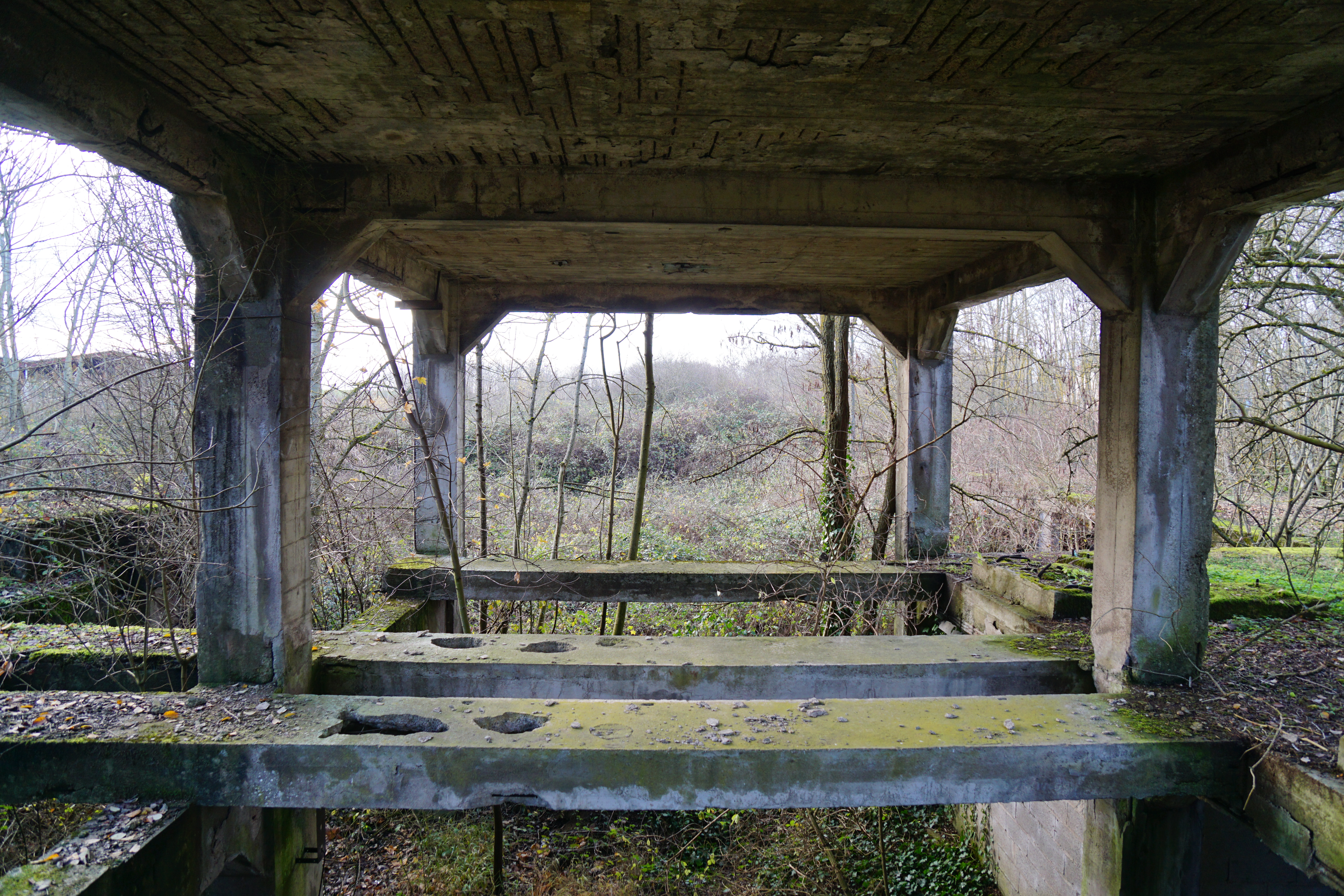
The interior of the same building.

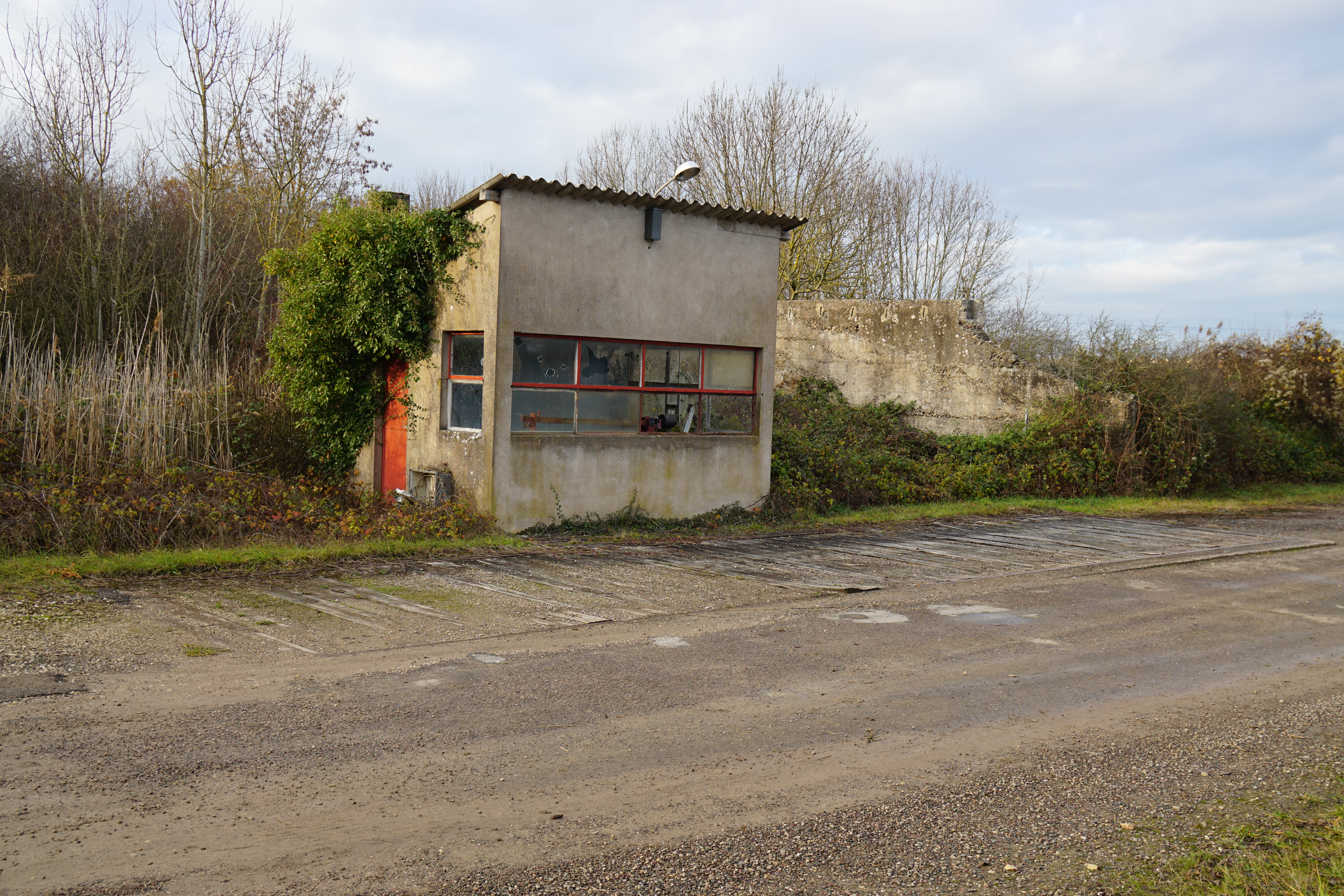
The weighing scale.

Before 2022, the site was sold by the department to a private company which demolished the ruins of the concrete installations. The site was then subject to illegal dumping and burning.

== See also ==
- Autun oil shale deposit
- Les Télots Mine
- Mining in France
- Oil reserves in France
- Oil shale
- Shale oil
- Unconventional (oil and gas) reservoir

== Bibliography ==
- Rénet, Christian (1998). Aventure pétrolière en Haute-Saône : Les schistes bitumeux de Creveney [Oil adventure in Haute-Saône: The oil shale of Creveney] (in French). C. Rénet.
- Barlot, J. (1933). "L'industrie des schistes hydrocarburés en Franche-Comté" [The hydrocarbon shale industry in Franche-Comté]. La Nature (in French). 2910: 110–113.
- Lanoir, Marcel (1931). "Carburants rhodaniens : les schistes bitumineux, notamment dans la Haute-Saône" [Rhone fuels: oil shale, particularly in Haute-Saône]. Les Études rhodaniennes (in French). 7 (3): 325–333. doi:10.3406/geoca.1931.3897.
