= Environmental impact of the oil shale industry =

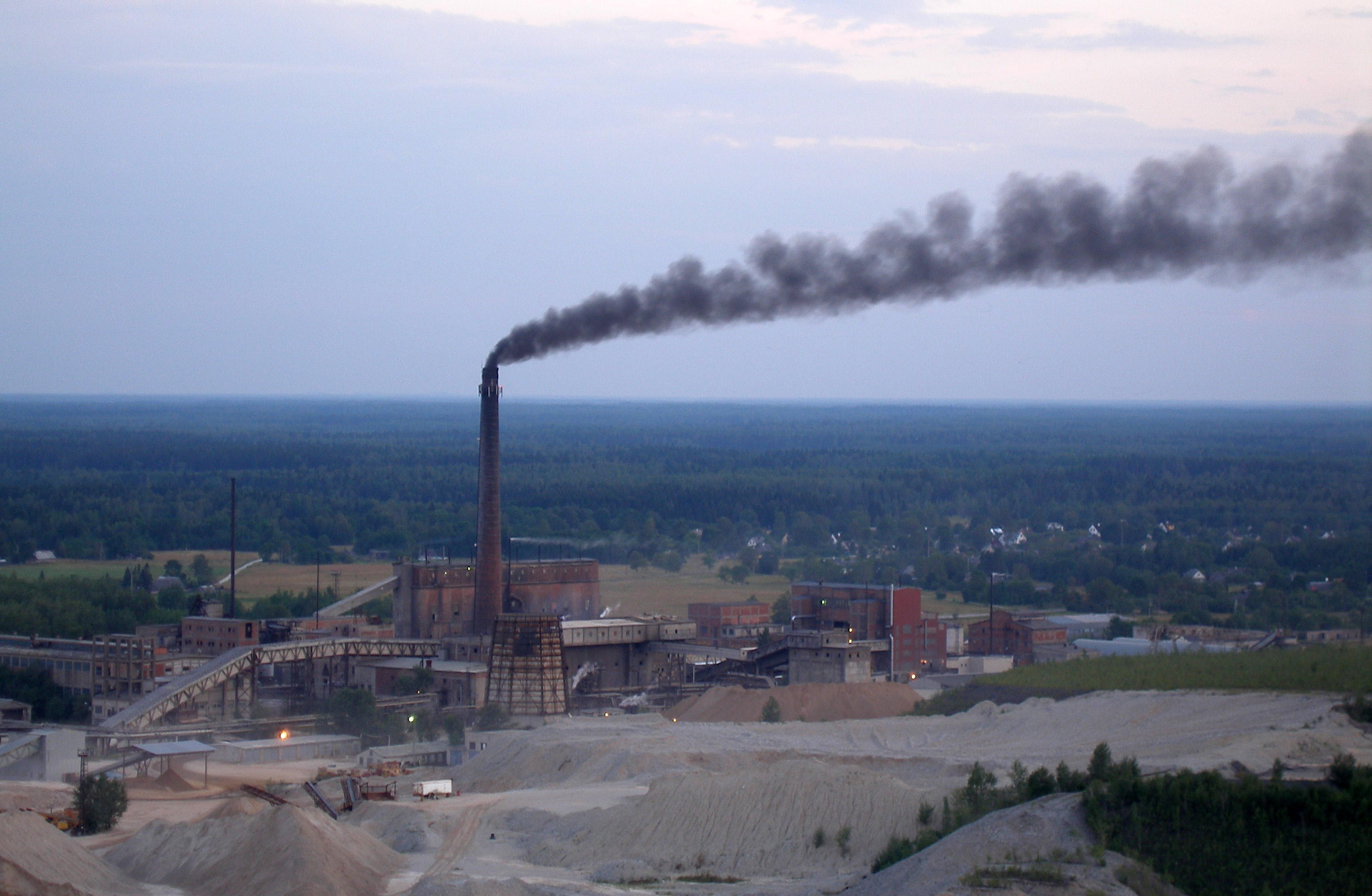
Kiviõli Oil Shale Processing & Chemicals Plant in Ida-Virumaa, Estonia

Environmental impact of the oil shale industry includes the consideration of issues such as land use, waste management, and water and air pollution caused by the extraction and processing of oil shale. Surface mining of oil shale deposits causes the usual environmental impacts of open-pit mining. In addition, the combustion and thermal processing generate waste material, which must be disposed of, and harmful atmospheric emissions, including carbon dioxide, a major greenhouse gas. Experimental in-situ conversion processes and carbon capture and storage technologies may reduce some of these concerns in future, but may raise others, such as the pollution of groundwater.

== Surface mining and retorting ==
=== Land use and waste management ===
Surface mining and in-situ processing requires extensive land use. Mining, processing, and waste disposal require land to be withdrawn from traditional uses, and therefore should avoid high density population areas. Oil shale mining reduces the original ecosystem diversity with habitats supporting a variety of plants and animals. After mining the land has to be reclaimed, process takes time and cannot necessarily re-establish the original biodiversity. The impact of sub-surface mining on the surroundings will be less than for open pit mines. However, sub-surface mining may also cause subsidence of the surface due to the collapse of mined-out area and abandoned stone drifts.

Disposal of mining wastes, spent oil shale (including semi-coke) and combustion ashes needs additional land use. According to the study of the European Academies Science Advisory Council, after processing, the waste material occupies a greater volume than the material extracted, and therefore cannot be wholly disposed underground. According to this, production of a barrel of shale oil can generate up to 1.5 tonnes of semi-coke, which may occupy up to 25% greater volume than the original shale. This is not confirmed by the results of Estonia's oil shale industry. The mining and processing of about one billion tonnes of oil shale in Estonia has created about 360-370 million tonnes of solid waste, of which 90 million tonnes is a mining waste, 70–80 million tonnes is a semi-coke, and 200 million tonnes are combustion ashes.

The waste material may consist of several pollutants including sulfates, heavy metals, and polycylic aromatic hydrocarbons (PAHs), some of which are toxic and carcinogenic. To avoid contamination of the groundwater, the solid waste from the thermal treatment process is disposed in an open dump (landfill or "heaps"), not underground where it could potentially reach clean ground water. As semi-coke consists of, in addition to minerals, up to 10% organics that may pose hazard to the environment owing to leaching of toxic compounds as well as to the possibility of self-ignition.

=== Water management ===
Mining influences the water runoff pattern of the area affected. In some cases it requires the lowering of groundwater levels below the level of the oil shale strata, which may have harmful effects on the surrounding arable land and forest. In Estonia, for each cubic meter of oil shale mined, 25 cubic meters of water must be pumped from the mine area. At the same time, the thermal processing of oil shale needs water for quenching hot products and the control of dust. Water concerns are a particularly sensitive issue in arid regions, such as the western part of the United States and Israel's Negev Desert, where there are plans to expand the oil shale industry. Depending on technology, above-ground retorting uses between one and five barrels of water per barrel of produced shale oil. In situ processing, according to one estimate, uses about one-tenth as much water.

Water is the main transmitter of oil shale industry pollutants. One environmental issue is to prevent noxious materials leaching from spent shale into the water supply. The oil shale processing is accompanied by the formation of process waters and waste waters containing phenols, tar and several other products, heavily separable and toxic to the environment. A 2008 programmatic environmental impact statement issued by the United States Bureau of Land Management stated that surface mining and retort operations produce 2 to 10 U.S. gallons (7.6 to 37.9 L; 1.7 to 8.3 imp gal) of waste water per 1 short ton (0.91 t) of processed oil shale.

=== Air pollution management ===
Main air pollution is caused by the oil shale-fired power plants. These factory plants provide the atmospheric emissions of gaseous products like nitrogen oxides, sulfur dioxide and hydrogen chloride, and the airborne particulate matter (fly ash). It includes particles of different types (carbonaceous, inorganic ones) and different sizes. The concentration of air pollutants in flue gas depends primarily on the combustion technology and burning regime, while the emissions of solid particles are determined by the efficiency of fly ash-capturing devices.

Open deposition of semi-coke causes distribution of pollutants in addition to aqueous vectors also via air (dust).

There are possible links from being in an oil shale area to a higher risk of asthma and lung cancer than other areas.

=== Greenhouse gas emissions ===
Carbon dioxide emissions from the production of shale oil and shale gas are higher than conventional oil production and a report for the European Union warns that increasing public concern about the adverse consequences of global warming may lead to opposition to oil shale development.

Emissions arise from several sources. These include CO_{2} released by the decomposition of the kerogen and carbonate minerals in the extraction process, the generation of the energy needed to heat the shale and in the other oil and gas processing operations, and fuel used in the mining of the rock and the disposal of waste. As the varying mineral composition and calorific value of oil shale deposits varies widely, the actual values vary considerably. At best, the direct combustion of oil shales produces carbon emissions similar to those from the lowest form of coal, lignite, at 2.15 moles CO_{2}/MJ, an energy source which is also politically contentious due to its high emission levels. For both power generation and oil extraction, the CO_{2} emissions can be reduced by better utilization of waste heat from the product streams.

== In-situ processing ==
Currently, the in-situ process is the most attractive proposition due to the reduction in standard surface environmental problems. However, in-situ processes do involve possible significant environmental costs to aquifers, especially since in-situ methods may require ice-capping or some other form of barrier to restrict the flow of the newly gained oil into the groundwater aquifers. However, after the removal of the freeze wall these methods can still cause groundwater contamination as the hydraulic conductivity of the remaining shale increases allowing groundwater to flow through and leach salts from the newly toxic aquifer.

== See also ==
- Oil shale geology
- Oil shale industry
- Oil shale economics

== External links and further reading ==
- Oil Shale and Tar Sands Draft Programmatic Environmental Impact Statement (EIS) Concerning potential leases of Federal oil sands lands in Utah and oil shale lands in Utah, Wyoming, and Colorado
