= Oil shale economics =

Economic feasibility of oil shale extraction and processing

Oil shale economics deals with the economic feasibility of oil shale extraction and processing. Although usually oil shale economics is understood as shale oil extraction economics, the wider approach evaluates usage of oil shale as a whole, including for the oil-shale-fired power generation and production of by-products during retorting or shale oil upgrading processes.

The economic feasibility of oil shale is highly dependent on the price of conventional oil, and the assumption that the price will remain at a certain level for some time to come. As a developing fuel source the production and processing costs for oil shale are high due to the small nature of the projects and the specialist technology involved. A full-scale project to develop oil shale would require heavy investment and could potentially leave businesses vulnerable should the oil price drop and the cost of producing the oil exceed the price they could obtain for the oil.

Due to the volatile prices and high capital costs few deposits can be exploited economically without subsidies. However, some countries, such as Estonia, Brazil, and China, operate oil-shale industries, while some others, including Australia, United States, Canada, Jordan, Israel, and Egypt, are contemplating establishing or re-establishing this industry.

The production cost of a barrel of shale oil ranges from as high as US$95 per barrel to as low US$25 per barrel, although there is no recent confirmation of the latter figure. The industry is proceeding cautiously due to the losses incurred during the last major investment into oil shale in the early 1980s, when a subsequent collapse in the oil price left the projects uneconomic.

== Break-even price of crude oil ==
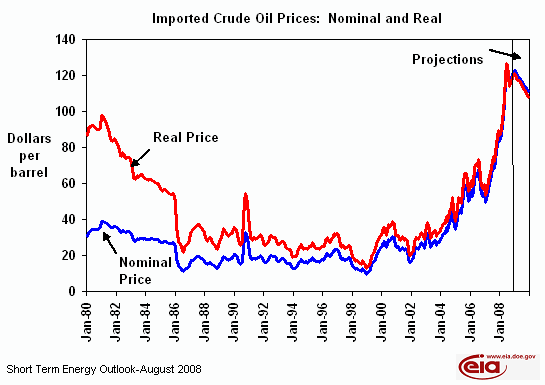
Real and Nominal Oil Prices, 1980-2008

The various attempts to develop oil shale deposits have succeeded only when the cost of shale-oil production in a given region comes in below the price of crude oil or its other substitutes (break-even price). The United States Department of Energy estimates that the ex-situ processing would be economic at sustained average world oil prices above US$54 per barrel and in-situ processing would be economic at prices above $35 per barrel. These estimates assume a return rate of 15%. The International Energy Agency estimates, based on the various pilot projects, that investment and operating costs would be similar to those of Canadian oil sands, that means would be economic at prices above $60 per barrel at current costs. This figure does not account carbon pricing, which will add additional cost. According to the New Policies Scenario introduced in its World Energy Outlook 2010, a price of $50 per tonne of emitted CO_{2}, expected by 2035, will add additional $7.50 per barrel cost of shale oil.

According to a survey conducted by the RAND Corporation, the cost of producing a barrel of oil at a surface retorting complex in the United States (comprising a mine, retorting plant, upgrading plant, supporting utilities, and spent shale reclamation), would range between $70–95 ($440–600/m^{3}, adjusted to 2005 values). This estimate considers varying levels of kerogen quality and extraction efficiency. In order for the operation to be profitable, the price of crude oil would need to remain above these levels. The analysis also discusses the expectation that processing costs would drop after the complex was established. The hypothetical unit would see a cost reduction of 35–70% after its first 500 million barrels (79×10^{6} m^{3}) were produced. Assuming an increase in output of 25 thousand barrels per day (4.0×10^{3} m^{3}/d) during each year after the start of commercial production, the costs would then be expected to decline to $35–48 per barrel ($220–300/m^{3}) within 12 years. After achieving the milestone of 1 billion barrels (160×10^{6} m^{3}), its costs would decline further to $30–40 per barrel ($190–250/m^{3}).

In 2025 Incorrys estimates that the lowest average full cycle cost for US tight oil in 2022-2024 was in the Permian Delaware at $48.50/Bbl followed by Williston at $54.00/Bbl and Permian Midland at $59.00/Bbl. Full cycle cost includes capital and operational cost, basis differential to WTI, royalties and taxes, general and administrative expenses, and cost of capital for oil producers.

In 2005, Royal Dutch Shell announced that its in situ extraction technology could become competitive at prices over $30 per barrel ($190/m^{3}). However, Shell reported in 2007 that the cost of creating an underground freeze wall to contain groundwater contamination had significantly escalated. Anyway, as the commercial scale production by Shell is not foreseen until 2025, the real price needed to make production economic remains unclear.

At full-scale production, the production costs for one barrel of light crude oil of the Australia's Stuart plant were projected to be in the range of $11.3 to $12.4 per barrel, including capital costs and operation costs over a projected 30-year lifetime. However, the project has been suspended due to environmental concerns.

The project of a new Alberta Taciuk Processor which was planned by VKG Oil, was estimated to achieve break-even financial feasibility operating at 30% capacity, assuming a crude oil price of $21 per barrel or higher. At 50% utilization, the project was expected to be economic at a price of $18 per barrel, while at full capacity, it could be economic at a price of $13 per barrel. However, instead of Alberta Taciuk Processor VKG proceeded with a Petroter retort which production price level is not disclosed. Production costs in China have been reported to be as low as less than $25 per barrel, although there is no recent confirmation of this figure.

== Capital cost ==
A comparison of the proposed American oil shale industry to the Alberta oil-sands industry has been drawn (the latter enterprise generated over 1 million barrels per day (160×10^{3} m^{3}/d) of oil in late 2007), stating that "the first-generation facility is the hardest, both technically and economically". According to the United States Department of Energy, in 1980s the costs of a 100,000 barrels per day (16,000 m^{3}/d) ex-situ processing complex ranged from $8–12 billion at 2005 prices. It is estimated that the current capital costs are $3–10 billion at 2005 prices.

The new 100,000 tonnes shale oil per year retort built by VKG cost EEK 1.1 billion (€70.3 million); however, it is located in the existing production site and uses the existing infrastructure.

The RAND Corporation assumes that the development of 100,000 barrels per day (16,000 m^{3}/d) processing plant in the United States will take 12 years, while to achieve the level of 1 million barrels per day (160×10^{3} m^{3}/d) will take at least 20 years and 3 million barrels per day (480×10^{3} m^{3}/d) around 30 years.

== Previous investment ==
In the second half of the 20th century, oil shale production ceased in Canada, Scotland, Sweden, France, Australia, Romania, and South Africa due to the low price of oil and other competitive fuels. In the United States, during the 1973 oil crisis businesses expected oil prices to stay as high as US$70 a barrel, and invested considerable sums in the oil shale industry. World production of oil shale reached a peak of 46 million tonnes in 1980. Due to competition from cheap conventional petroleum in the 1980s, several investments became economically unfeasible. On 2 May 1982, known as "Black Sunday", Exxon canceled its US$5 billion Colony Shale Oil Project near Parachute, Colorado because of low oil-prices and increased expenses. Because of the losses in 1980s, companies were reluctant to make new invests in shale oil production. However, in the early 21st century, USA, Canada and Jordan were planning or had started shale oil production test projects, and Australia was considering restarting oil shale production.

In a 1972 publication by the journal Pétrole Informations (ISSN 0755-561X), shale oil production was unfavorably compared to the liquefaction of coal. The article stated that coal liquefaction was less expensive, generated more oil, and created fewer environmental impacts than oil shale extraction. It cited a conversion ratio of 650 liters (170 U.S. gal; 140 imp gal) of oil per one ton of coal, as against 150 liters (40 U.S. gal) per one ton of shale oil.

== Energy usage ==
A measure of the viability of oil shale as a fuel source is the ratio of the energy produced to the energy used converting it (Energy Returned on Energy Invested - EROEI). The value of the EROEI for oil shale is difficult to calculate for a number of reasons. Lack of reliable studies of modern oil shale processes, poor or undocumented methodology and a limited number of operational facilities are the main reasons. Due to technically more complex processes, the EROEI for oil shale is below the EROEI of about 20:1 for conventional oil extraction at the wellhead.

A 1984 study estimated the EROEI of the different oil shale deposits to vary between 0.7–13.3:1. More recent studies estimates the EROEI of oil shales to be 1–2:1 or 2–16:1 – depending on if self-energy is counted as a cost or internal energy is excluded and only purchased energy is counted as input. According to the World Energy Outlook 2010, the EROEI of ex-situ processing is typically 4–5:1 while of in-situ processing it may be even as low as 2:1. Royal Dutch Shell has reported an expected EROEI about 3–4:1 on its in-situ test project.

Internal energy (or self-energy) is energy released by the oil shale conversion process that is used to power that operation (e.g. obtained by combustion of conversion by-products such as oil shale gas), and therefore reducing the use of other fuels (external energy). There are different views as to if the internal energy should be added to the calculation as cost or not. One opinion is that internal energy should not be counted as an energy cost because it does not have an opportunity cost, unlike external energy used in the process. Another opinion is that internal energy is used for performing useful work and therefore should be added to the calculation. It might also be argued that internal energy should be included as energy invested because it contributes to CO_{2} emissions. However, EROEI then becomes a measure of environmental acceptability rather than economic viability.

== Water usage ==
Development of oil shale resources will require significant quantities of water for mine and plant operations, reclamation, supporting infrastructure, and associated economic growth. Above-ground retorting typically consumes between one and five barrels of water per barrel of produced shale oil, depending on technology. For an oil shale industry producing 2.5 million barrels per day (400×10^{3} m^{3}/d), this equates to 105,000,000–315,000,000 US gallons per day (400,000–1,190,000 m^{3}/d) of water. These numbers include water requirements for power generation for in-situ heating processes, retorting, refining, reclamation, dust control and on-site worker demands. Municipal and other water requirements related to population growth associated with industry development will require an additional 58 million US gallons (220,000 m^{3}) per day. Hence, a 2.5 million barrels per day (400×10^{3} m^{3}/d) oil shale industry would require 180,000 to 420,000 acre-feet (220,000,000 to 520,000,000 m^{3}) of water per year, depending on location and processes used.

The largest deposit of oil shale in the United States is in the Green River basin. Though scarce, water in the western United States is treated as a commodity which can be bought and sold in a competitive market. Royal Dutch Shell has been reported to be buying groundwater rights in Colorado as it prepares to drill for oil in the shale deposits there. In the Colorado Big-Thompson project, average prices per share (0.7 acre-feet (860 m^{3})/share) increased from some $2,000 in 1990 to more than $12,000 in mid-2003 (constant 2001 dollars). CBT Prices from 2001 to 2006 has had a range of $10,000 to $14,000 per share, or $14,000 to $20,000 per acre foot. At $10,000 per acre foot, capital costs for water rights to produce 2.5 million barrels per day (400×10^{3} m^{3}/d) would range between $1.8-4.2 billion.

== Co-pyrolysis ==
Several co-pyrolysis processes to increase efficiency of oil shale retorting have been proposed or tested. In Estonia, the co-pyrolysis of kukersite with renewable fuel (wood waste), as well as with plastic and rubber wastes (tyres), has been tested. Co-pyrolysis of oil shale with high-density polyethylene (HDPE) has been tested also in Morocco and Turkey. Israel's AFSK Hom Tov co-pyrolyses oil shale with oil refinery residue (bitumen). Some tests involve co-pyrolysis of oil shale with lignite and cellulose wastes. Depending on reaction conditions, the co-pyrolysis may lead to higher conversion ratios and thus lower production costs, and in some cases solves the problem of utilization of certain wastes.

== See also ==
- Price of petroleum
- Environmental impact of the oil shale industry
