= Creveney =

- Commune
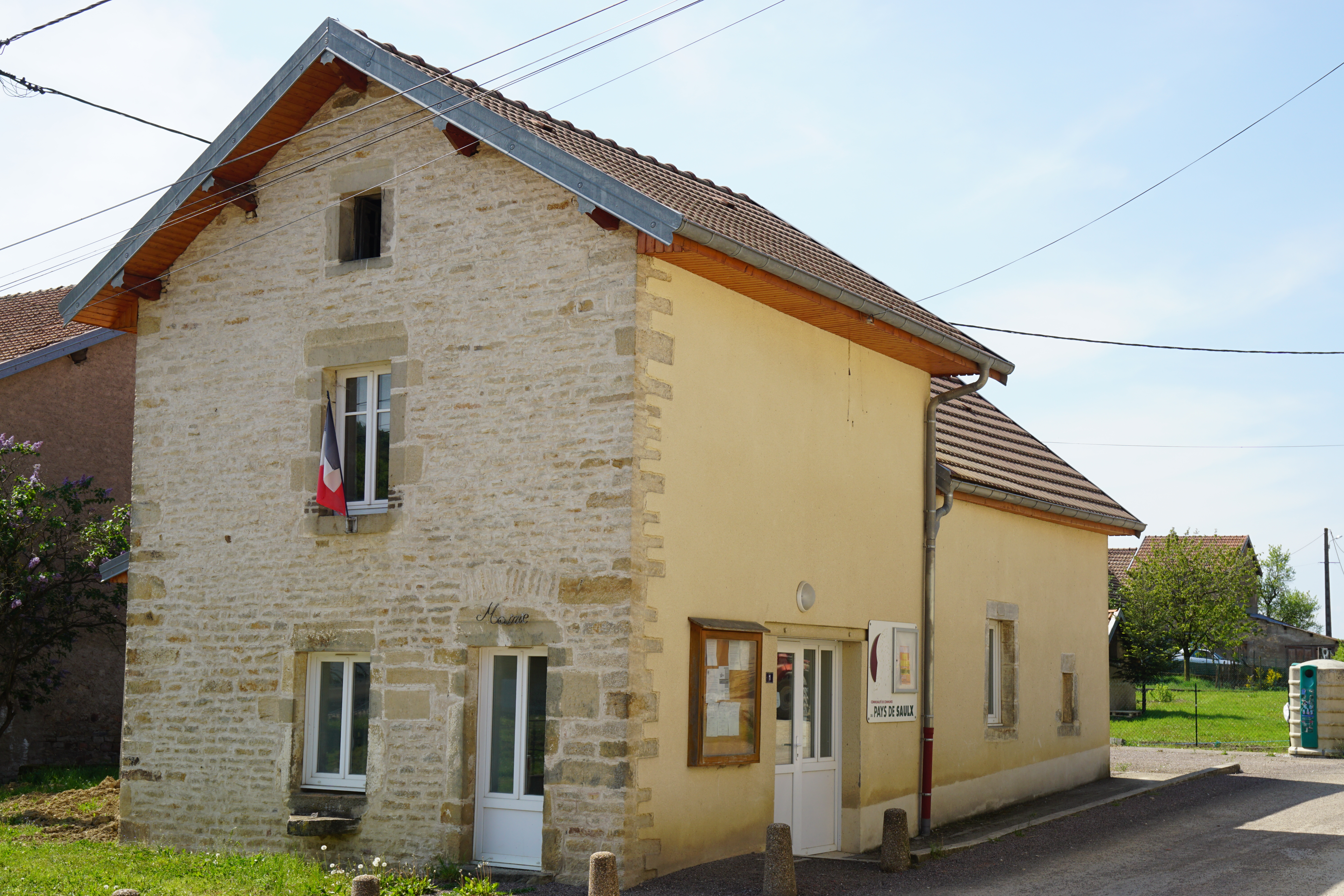
- The town hall in Creveney

- Coat of arms
- Location of Creveney
- Location within France Location within Bourgogne-Franche-Comté
- Coordinates: 47°41′05″N 6°17′33″E
- Country: France
- Region: Bourgogne-Franche-Comté
- Department: Haute-Saône
- Arrondissement: Lure
- Canton: Lure-1
- Area^{1}: 2.44 km^{2} (0.94 sq mi)
- Highest elevation: 331 m (1,086 ft)
- Lowest elevation: 249 m (817 ft)
- Population (2023): 44
  - Density: 18/km^{2} (47/sq mi)
- Time zone: UTC+01:00 (CET)
  - Summer (DST): UTC+02:00 (CEST)
- INSEE/Postal code: 70188 /70240
- ^{1} French Land Register data, which excludes lakes, ponds, glaciers > 1 km^{2} (0.386 sq mi or 247 acres) and river estuaries.

Creveney is a commune in the Haute-Saône department in the region of Bourgogne-Franche-Comté in eastern France.

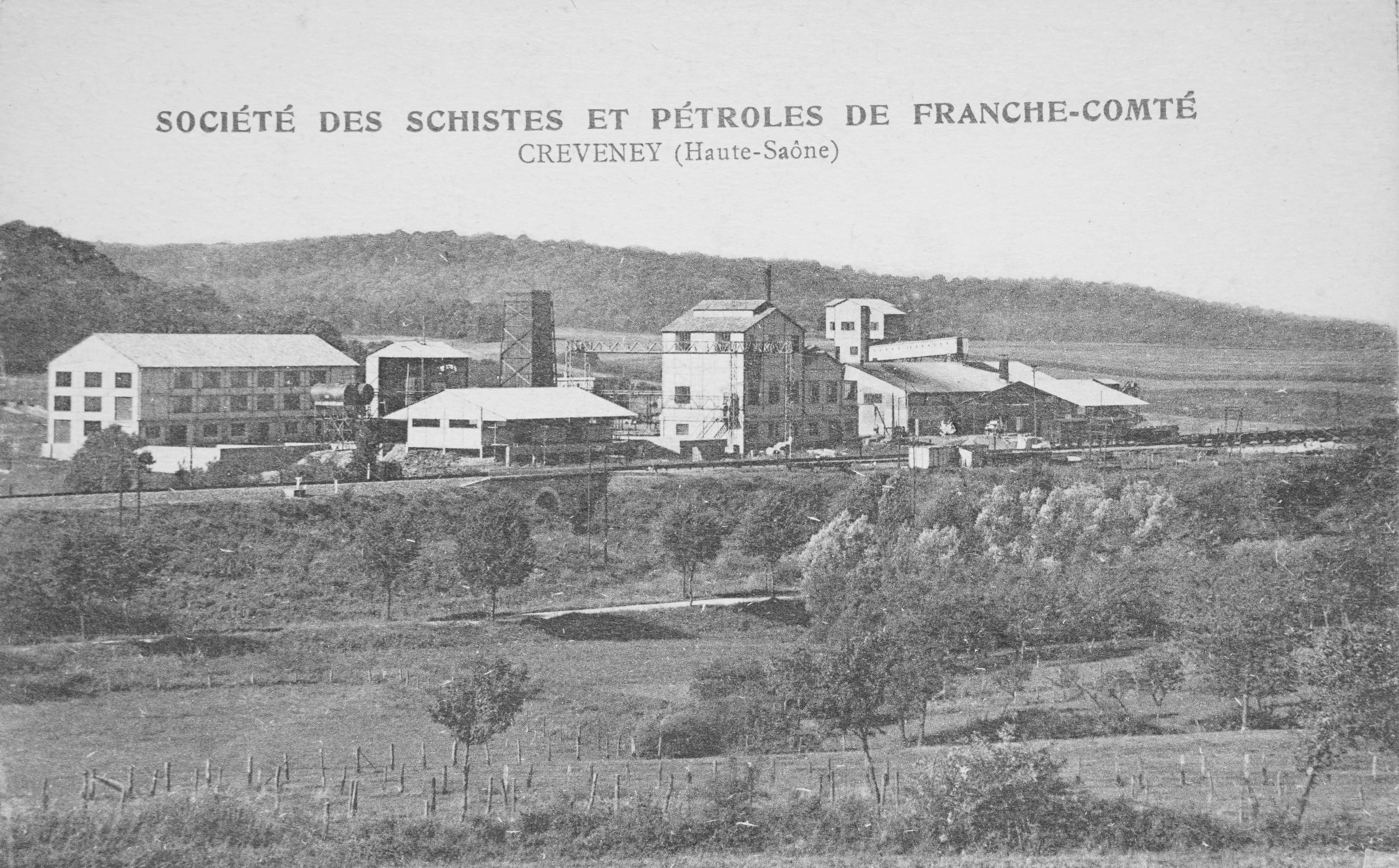
Creveney bituminous shale distillation plant, a rare operation in France between the two world wars

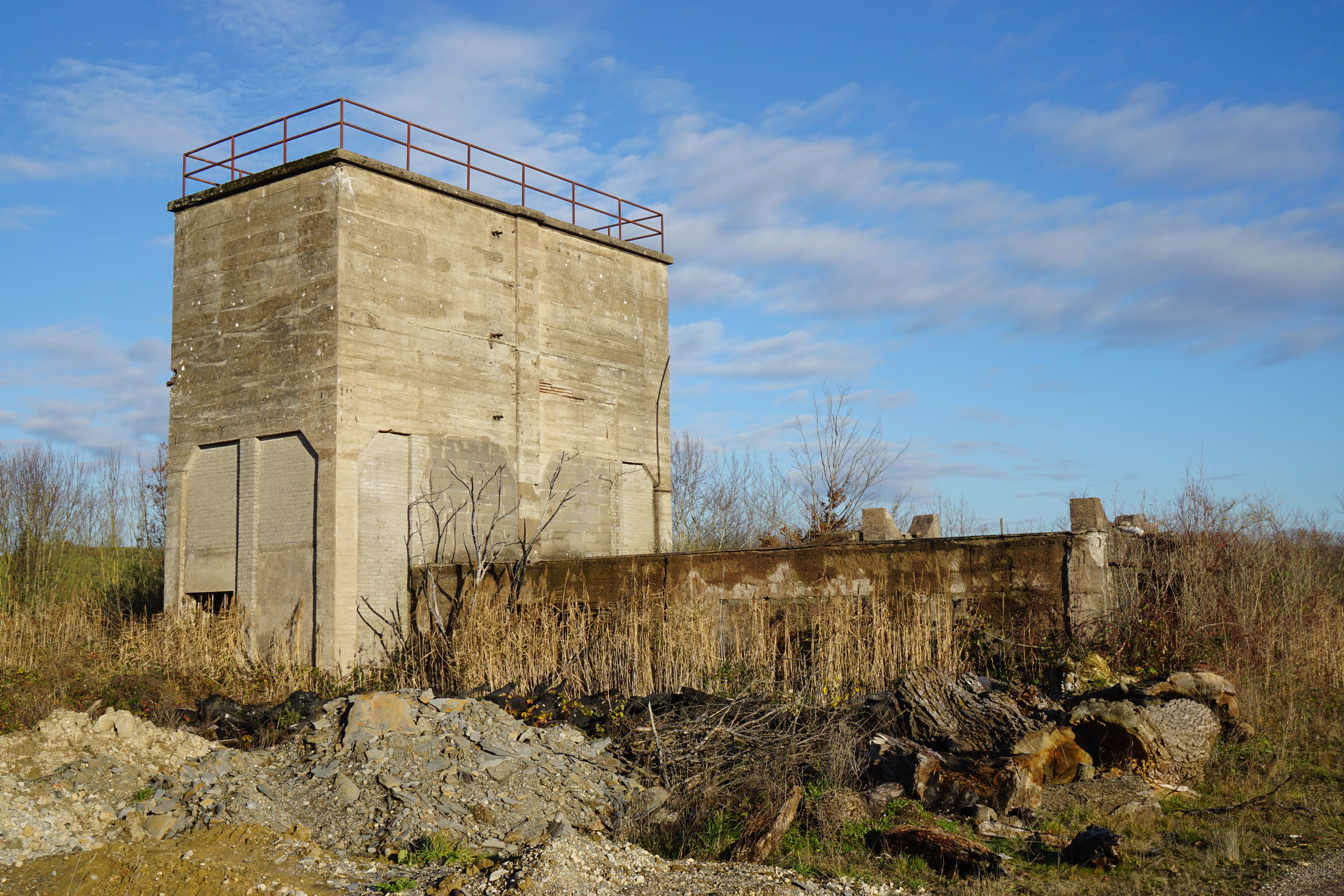
The ruins in 2015.

== See also ==
- Communes of the Haute-Saône department
