= Shale oil =

Oil produced from oil shale rock fragments

Shale oil is an unconventional oil produced from oil shale rock fragments by pyrolysis, hydrogenation, or thermal dissolution. These processes convert the organic matter within the rock (kerogen) into synthetic oil and gas. The resulting oil can be used immediately as a fuel or upgraded to meet refinery feedstock specifications by adding hydrogen and removing impurities such as sulfur and nitrogen. The refined products can be used for the same purposes as those derived from crude oil.

The term "shale oil" is also used for crude oil produced from shales of other unconventional, very low permeability formations. However, to reduce the risk of confusion of shale oil produced from oil shale with crude oil in oil-bearing shales, the term "tight oil" is preferred for the latter. The International Energy Agency recommends to use the term "light tight oil" and World Energy Resources 2013 report by the World Energy Council uses the term "tight oil" for crude oil in oil-bearing shales.

== History ==
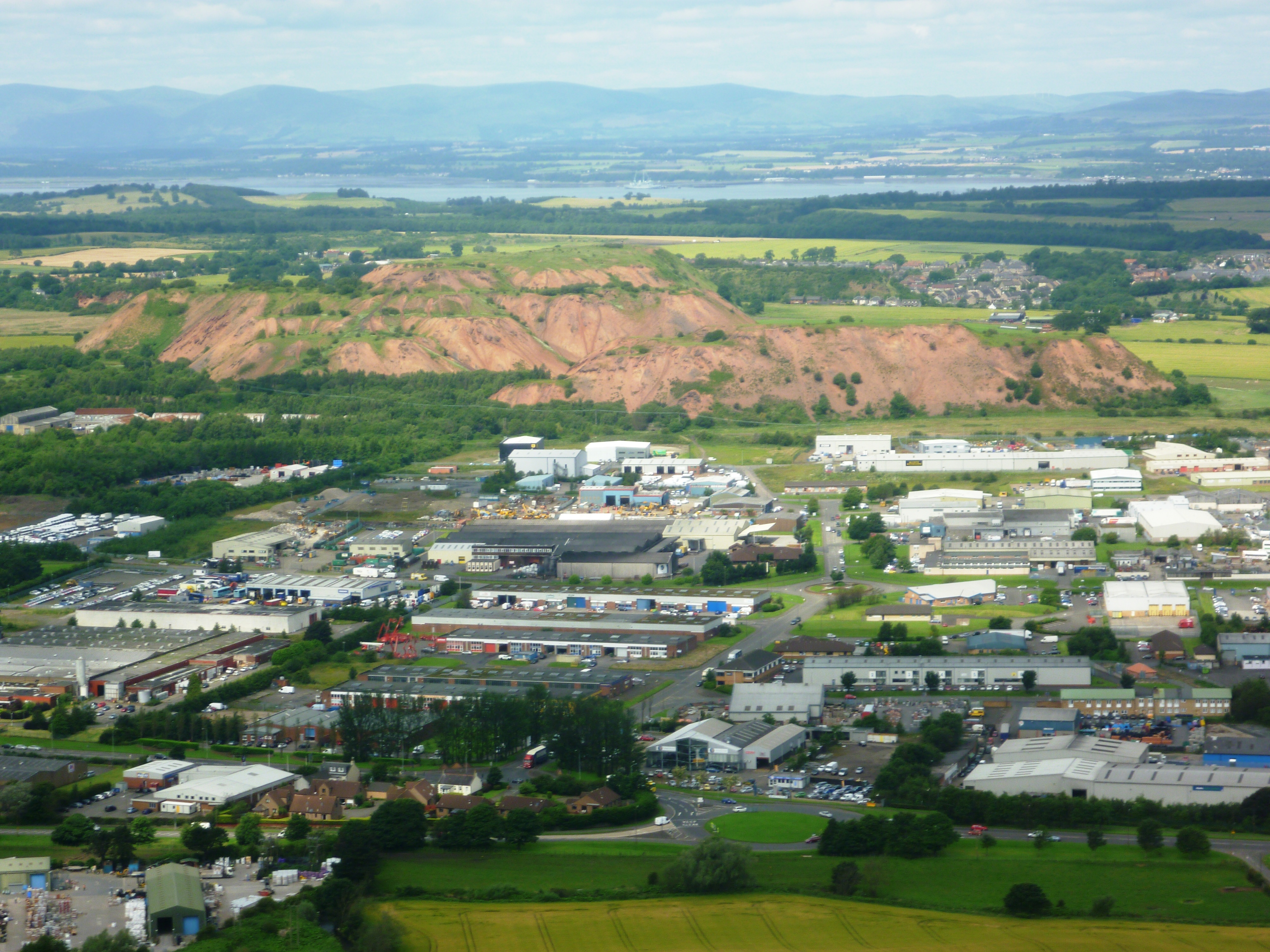
Three West Lothian shale mounds, evidence of the early paraffin oil industry in the 19th century Scotland

Oil shale was one of the first sources of mineral oil used by humans. In the 10th century, the Arabic physician Masawaih al-Mardini (Mesue the Younger) first described a method of extracting oil from "some kind of bituminous shale". It was also reported to have been used in Switzerland and Austria in the early 14th century. In 1596, the personal physician of Frederick I, Duke of Württemberg wrote of its healing properties. Shale oil was used to light the streets of Modena, Italy at the turn of the 18th century. The British Crown granted a patent in 1694 to three persons who had "found a way to extract and make great quantities of pitch, tarr and oyle out of a sort of stone." Later sold as Betton's British Oil, the distilled product was said to have been "tried by diverse persons in Aches and Pains with much benefit." Modern shale oil extraction industries were established in France during the 1830s and in Scotland during the 1840s. The oil was used as fuel, as a lubricant and lamp oil; the Industrial Revolution had created additional demand for lighting. It served as a substitute for the increasingly scarce and expensive whale oil.

During the late 19th century, shale-oil extraction plants were built in Australia, Brazil and the United States. China, Estonia, New Zealand, South Africa, Spain, Sweden and Switzerland produced shale oil in the early 20th century. The discovery of crude oil in the Middle East during mid-century brought most of these industries to a halt, although Estonia and Northeast China maintained their extraction industries into the early 21st century. In response to rising petroleum prices at the turn of the 21st century, extraction operations have commenced, been explored, or been renewed in the United States, China, Australia and Jordan.

== Extraction process ==
Shale oil is extracted by pyrolysis, hydrogenation, or thermal dissolution of oil shale. The pyrolysis of the rock is performed in a retort, situated either above ground or within the rock formation itself. As of 2008, most oil shale industries perform the shale oil extraction process after the rock is mined, crushed and transported to a retorting facility, although several experimental technologies perform the process in place. The temperature at which the kerogen decomposes into usable hydrocarbons varies with the time-scale of the process; in the above-ground retorting process decomposition begins at 300 °C (570 °F), but proceeds more rapidly and completely at higher temperatures. Decomposition takes place most quickly at a temperature between 480 and 520 °C (900 and 970 °F).

Hydrogenation and thermal dissolution (reactive fluid processes) extract the oil using hydrogen donors, solvents, or a combination of these. Thermal dissolution involves the application of solvents at elevated temperatures and pressures, increasing oil output by cracking the dissolved organic matter. Different methods produce shale oil with different properties.

A critical measure of the viability of extraction of shale oil lies in the ratio of the energy produced by the oil shale to the energy used in its mining and processing, a ratio known as "Energy Returned on Energy Invested" (EROEI). An EROEI of 2 (or 2:1 ratio) would mean that to produce 2 barrels of actual oil the equivalent in energy of 1 barrel of oil has to be burnt/consumed. A 1984 study estimated the EROEI of the various known oil-shale deposits as varying between 0.7 and 13.3. More recent studies estimates the EROEI of oil shales to be 1–2:1 or 2–16:1 – depending on whether self-energy is counted as a cost or internal energy is excluded and only purchased energy is counted as input. Royal Dutch Shell reported an EROEI of three to four in 2006 on its in situ development in the "Mahogany Research Project."

The amount of oil that can be recovered during retorting varies with the oil shale and the technology used. About one sixth of the oil shales in the Green River Formation have a relatively high yield of 25 to 100 US gallons (95 to 379 L; 21 to 83 imp gal) of shale oil per ton of oil shale; about one third yield from 10 to 25 US gallons (38 to 95 L; 8.3 to 20.8 imp gal) per ton. (Ten US gal/ton is approximately 3.4 tons of oil per 100 tons of shale.) About half of the oil shales in the Green River Formation yield less than 10 US gal/ton.

The major global shale oil producers have published their yields for their commercial operations. Fushun Mining Group reports producing 300,000 tons per year of shale oil from 6.6 million tons of shale, a yield of 4.5% by weight. VKG Oil claims to produce 250,000 tons of oil per year from 2 million tons of shale, a yield of 13%. Petrobras produces in their Petrosix plant 550 tons of oil per day from 6,200 tons of shale, a yield of 9%.

== Properties ==
The properties of raw shale oil vary depending on the composition of the parent oil shale and the extraction technology used. Like conventional oil, shale oil is a complex mixture of hydrocarbons, and is characterized according to the bulk properties of the oil. It usually contains large quantities of olefinic and aromatic hydrocarbons. It can also contain significant quantities of heteroatoms. A typical shale oil composition includes 0.5–1% of oxygen, 1.5–2% of nitrogen and 0.15–1% of sulfur; some deposits contain more heteroatoms than others. Mineral particles and metals are often present as well. Generally, the oil is less fluid than crude oil, becoming pourable at temperatures between 24 and 27 °C (75 and 81 °F), while conventional crude oil is pourable at temperatures between −60 and 30 °C (−76 and 86 °F); this property affects shale oil's ability to be transported in existing oil pipelines.

Shale oil contains polycyclic aromatic hydrocarbons, which are carcinogenic. The US EPA has concluded that raw shale oil has a mild carcinogenic potential, comparable to some intermediate petroleum refinery products, while upgraded shale oil has lower carcinogenic potential, as most of the polycyclic aromatics are believed to have been broken down by hydrogenation. The World Health Organization classifies shale oil as a Group 1 carcinogen to humans.

== Upgrading ==
Although raw shale oil can be immediately burnt as a fuel oil, many of its applications require that it be upgraded. The differing properties of the raw oils call for correspondingly various pre-treatments before it can be sent to a conventional oil refinery.

Particulates in the raw oil clog downstream processes; sulfur and nitrogen create air pollution. Sulfur and nitrogen, along with the arsenic and iron that may be present, also destroy the catalysts used in refining. Olefins form insoluble sediments and cause instability. The oxygen within the oil, present at higher levels than in crude oil, lends itself to the formation of destructive free radicals. Hydrodesulfurization and hydrodenitrogenation can address these problems and result in a product comparable to benchmark crude oil. Phenols can be first removed by water extraction. Upgrading shale oil into transport fuels requires adjusting hydrogen–carbon ratios by adding hydrogen (hydrocracking) or removing carbon (coking).

Shale oil produced by some technologies, such as the Kiviter process, can be used without further upgrading as an oil constituent and as a source of phenolic compounds. Distillate oils from the Kiviter process can also be used as diluents for petroleum-originated heavy oils and as an adhesive-enhancing additive in bituminous materials such as asphalt.

== Uses ==
Before World War II, most shale oil was upgraded for use as transport fuels. Afterwards, it was used as a raw material for chemical intermediates, pure chemicals and industrial resins, and as a railroad wood preservative. As of 2008, it is primarily used as a heating oil and marine fuel, and to a lesser extent in the production of various chemicals.

Shale oil's concentration of high-boiling point compounds is suited for the production of middle distillates such as kerosene, jet fuel and diesel fuel. Additional cracking can create the lighter hydrocarbons used in gasoline.

"Pale sulfonated shale oil" (PSSO), a sulfonated and ammonia-neutralized variant named "Ichthammol" (chemical name: Ammonium bituminosulfonate) is still in application today.

== Reserves and production ==
Global technically recoverable oil shale reserves have recently been estimated at 2.8 to 3.3 trillion barrels (450×10^{9} to 520×10^{9} m^{3}) of shale oil, with the largest reserves in the United States, which is thought to have 1.5–2.6 trillion barrels (240×10^{9}–410×10^{9} m^{3}). Worldwide production of shale oil was estimated at 17,700 barrels per day (2,810 m^{3}/d) in 2008. The leading producers were China (7,600 barrels per day (1,210 m^{3}/d)), Estonia (6,300 barrels per day (1,000 m^{3}/d)), and Brazil (3,800 barrels per day (600 m^{3}/d)).

The production of shale oil has been hindered because of technical difficulties and costs. In March 2011, the United States Bureau of Land Management called into question proposals for commercial operations in Colorado, Utah and Wyoming, stating that "(t)here are no economically viable ways yet known to extract and process oil shale for commercial purposes". The US Energy Information Administration sometimes uses the phrase "shale (tight) oil" to refer to tight oil, "crude oil ... produced directly from tight oil resources". In 2021, the US produced 7.23 million barrels of such tight oil each day, equal to about 64% of total U.S. crude oil production. The IEA also occasionally calls tight oil "shale oil", but classifies any products from oil shale with solid fuels.

== See also ==
- Unconventional (oil & gas) reservoir
- Oil shale economics
- Oil shale gas
- Underground coal gasification
- Spent shale
- Vaca Muerta
- Creveney shale mining operation
