= FAB Link =

Proposed electricity interconnector between the UK and France

- Map of FAB Link

Location
- Country: France; Alderney; England
- From: L'Étang-Bertrand (lieu-dit Menuel)
- Passes through: Alderney; English Channel
- To: Exeter Airport

Ownership information
- Partners: RTE and FAB Link Limited

Construction information
- Construction started: Planned
- Commissioned: 2030/31 (planned)

Technical information
- Type: submarine
- Current type: HVDC
- Total length: 220 km (140 mi)
- Capacity: 1,250 MW
- AC voltage: ±400 kV
- DC voltage: ±320 kV

FAB Link is a proposed HVDC Interconnector, spanning the 220 kilometres (140 mi) between France and Great Britain, running close to the island of Alderney.

As of March 2022, project planning has tentatively re-started after a five-year pause.

== Current project status ==
In 2017, the French energy regulator said it needed more clarity on the conditions of the UK’s exit from the European Union, putting the whole project in doubt.

In March 2022, the project promoters, FAB Link Limited and RTE, agreed to "review and reassess the project." The aim is to seek regulators' support to restart the project.

In July 2022 the proposed route was announced and it would avoid landfall in Alderney.

On 1 June 2023 the project announced a reduction in the interconnector capacity to 1,250 MW with the construction due to be completed in 2030/31.

== Route ==
According to plans, 25 km AC land cables in France (L'Étang-Bertrand, lieu-dit Menuel), landfall will be made at Siouville-Hague, 30 km HVDC submarine cables between France and Alderney. 1 km land cables across Alderney, 140 km HVDC submarine cables with landfall at Budleigh Salterton with 20 km HVDC land cables to a converter station planned to be located near Exeter Airport with some AC land cables to connect to the grid in England.

Within Alderney, The FAB Link is a set of cables, each 5 inches in diameter, buried 1–2 metres deep crossing Alderney at Longis Common. It connects to the undersea cables from France to Alderney and from Alderney to England.

The final proposed route will not make landfall in Alderney.

== Technical specification ==
Twin 700 MW cables giving a capacity of 1,400 MW.

Land cables carry 400 kV AC Voltage, The submarine voltage will be 320 kV DC Voltage.

Voltage Sourced Converters (VSC) are the preferred converter technology.

== Project economics ==
The cost is estimated at €750m.

The FAB project has received funding from the European Commission through the Connecting Europe Facility of €7.235m

FAB is unlikely to facilitate the export of electricity from Tidal Turbines in Alderney’s waters, due to the cable bypassing the Island.

Submarine power cables need to incorporate fibre optic cables to monitor performance, which gives an excess capacity that can be used for high-speed communications.

Alderney will not now receive rent of around £70,000 per annum for the facilities they would have provided together with a possible reduction in electricity prices paid by consumers, following the cool response from Alderney and the change in the final route to bypass the Island.

== Wider context ==
A European project, part of a series of grid ‘interconnectors’ between mainland Europe and UK, part of the High-voltage direct current (HVDC) power interconnector system.

As of 2021, two other links (IFA 2000MW and IFA-2 1000MW) connect France with the United Kingdom. In 2022, ElecLink was completed and provides 1000MW capacity between the countries.

== Project history ==
In January 2017 applications for licences from the Marine Management Organisation, East Devon District Council and the States of Guernsey were submitted.

Approval for the project is expected after Ofgem give their final project assessment decision in July 2017 with the final investment decision made in late 2017.

The project was scheduled to commence construction in 2018 with a proposed completion by 2022. However, this schedule was delayed, with construction now planned to start in 2021 and completion in 2025.

== Project promoters ==
The project is being jointly developed by Réseau de Transport d'Électricité (RTE) and FAB Link Limited.

FAB Link Limited is a joint venture between Alderney Renewable Energy Limited and Transmission Investment LLP. Transmission Investment is a leading independent transmission business spanning origination, project development, acquisition management, financial structuring and asset management. It is doubtful whether a connection is possible to the cable following the decision to bypass Alderney, making it unlikely to be viable to connect any renewable system to the cable.

== Planning issues ==
Unresolved conflicts about the appropriateness of this project to the island resulted in the delaying of controversial planning law changes in 2016. The unprecedented change of law would open the area known as the "Green Belt" to industrial utility development, granting FAB Link permission to lay cables across a rural part of Alderney. The retention of the preservation laws would result in the cables having to by-pass Alderney altogether.

=== Controversy ===
Some Alderney residents believe the character of Alderney would be ruined, damaging the island's seasonal tourism industry; protest demonstrations took place in 2016 and in July 2017 to this end. Others believe the link will assist future tidal turbine projects and financially benefit construction and energy production contractors.

== See also ==
- Channel Islands Electricity Grid
- High-voltage direct current
