= IFA-2 =

Electrical interconnector between the UK and France

Location
- Country: France, United Kingdom
- Coordinates: 50°49′05″N 1°11′38″W; 49°06′39″N 0°15′43″W
- General direction: North–South
- From: Tourbe, France
- Passes through: English Channel
- To: Lee-on-the-Solent, Hampshire, United Kingdom

Ownership information
- Partners: National Grid plc Réseau de Transport d'Électricité

Construction information
- Cable manufacturer: Prysmian Group
- Substation manufacturer: ABB Group
- Construction started: 2017
- Commissioned: January 2021

Technical information
- Type: submarine cable
- Current type: HVDC
- Total length: 204 km (127 mi)
- Capacity: 1,000 MW
- DC voltage: ±320 kV
- No. of poles: 2
- No. of circuits: 1

IFA-2 (Interconnexion France-Angleterre 2) is a subsea electrical interconnector, running beneath the English Channel between France and the United Kingdom. The 204-kilometre (127 mi) high voltage direct current (HVDC) cable operates at +/-320kV with the capacity to transmit 1,000 MW of power. IFA-2 is the second interconnector built between France and Great Britain, after IFA (HVDC Cross-Channel) link.

== Route ==
The cable connects to the French grid at the Tourbe 400 kV substation. From there, a 300 m (1,000 ft) long high-voltage alternating current (HVAC) underground cable runs to the converter station nearby. A 24 km (15-mile) long underground HVDC cable runs from the converter station to the landfall point east of Merville-Franceville-Plage, near Caen in Normandy.

On the British side, the landfall point is located at Monks Hill Beach, at the southern end of Solent Airfield, near Portsmouth. The converter station is located to the north east of Solent Airfield. From there, a 2 km (1.2-mile) long HVAC cable runs underwater to the point of connection to the grid at Chilling 400 kV substation, near Warsash, Hampshire.

== Project history ==
The project was developed by IFA2 SAS, a joint venture between the UK's National Grid and RTE of France.

In 2015, the European Commission identified IFA-2 as one of key energy infrastructure projects.

In 2017, contract for IFA-2 was awarded to the Prysmian Group and ABB.

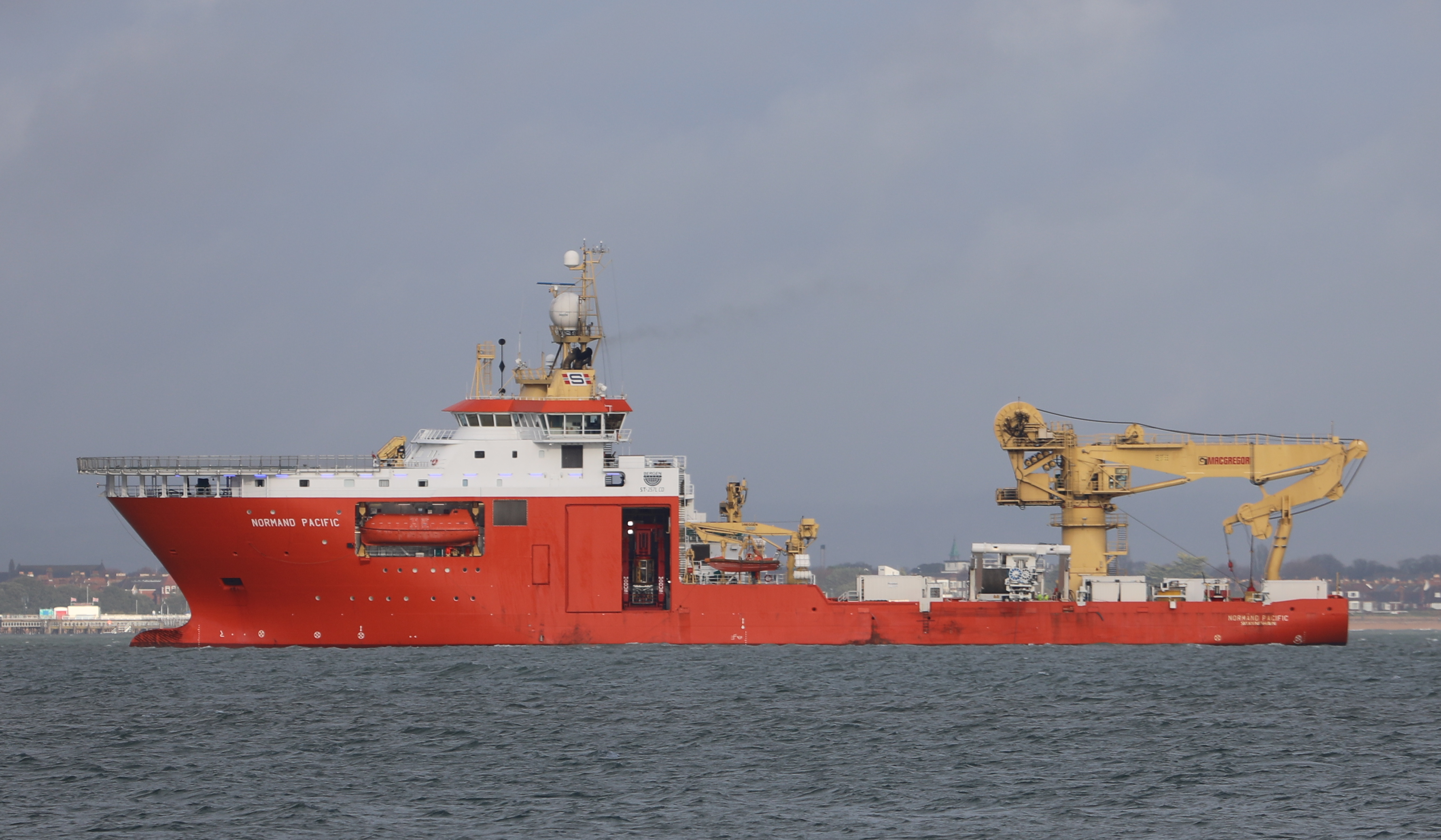
Normand Pacific in the Solent for cable burial works on IFA-2

In October 2019, the project completed the external construction of the UK convertor building. Cable laying works in the eastern Solent took place at the end of 2019.

The cable was energised for the first time on 15 October 2020, in preparation for testing before going live. It was placed into live operation on 22 January 2021 with an opening flow from France to the UK. The connector tripped in the morning of January 29, causing a loss of 900 MW, and grid batteries compensated some of the loss to keep frequency drop at 0.25 Hz.

== See also ==
- ElecLink, a 1,000 MW UK-France interconnector through the Channel Tunnel, completed in 2021
