= HVDC Cross-Channel =

Submarine HVDC interconnector between the UK and France

HVDC Cross-Channel Interconnexion France Angleterre
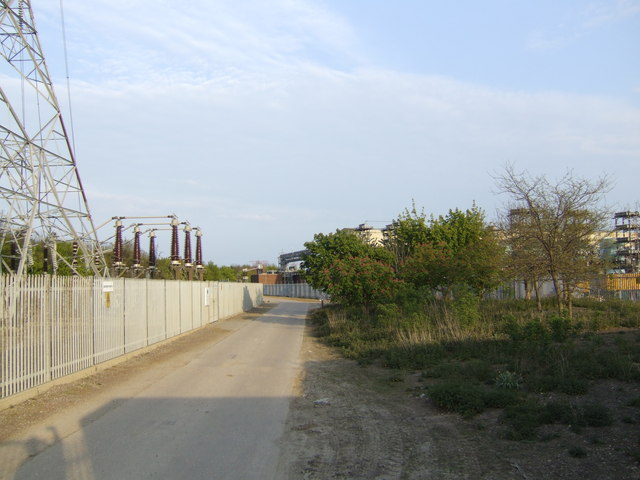
- Sellindge Converter Station on the UK side of the interconnector
- Location of Cross-Channel; Interconnexion France Angleterre

Location
- Country: France, United Kingdom
- General direction: North-South
- From: Sellindge, United Kingdom
- Passes through: English Channel
- To: Bonningues-lès-Calais, France

Ownership information
- Partners: National Grid plc Réseau de Transport d'Électricité

Construction information
- Cable manufacturer: Alstom
- Substation manufacturer: ASEA (160 MW scheme); Alstom (2,000 MW scheme)
- Construction started: 1985 (2,000 MW scheme)
- Commissioned: 1986 (2,000 MW scheme)

Technical information
- Type: submarine cable
- Current type: HVDC
- Total length: 73 km (45 mi)
- Capacity: 2,000 MW
- AC voltage: 400 kV
- DC voltage: ±270 kV
- No. of poles: 4 (2 bipoles)

The HVDC Cross-Channel (French: Interconnexion France Angleterre IFA 2000) is the 73-kilometre-long (45 mi) high-voltage direct current (HVDC) interconnector that has operated since 1986 under the English Channel between the continental European grid at Bonningues-lès-Calais and the British electricity grid at Sellindge. The cable is also known as IFA, and should not be confused with the new IFA-2, another interconnect with France that is three times as long but only half as powerful.

The current 2,000 MW link is bi-directional and the countries can import or export depending upon market demands, mostly depending upon weather conditions and availability of renewable energy on the British Isles, and French surplus of nuclear generation or demand for electric heating. It was completed in 1986, and replaced the first cross-Channel link which was a 160 MW link completed in 1961 and decommissioned in 1984.

A fire in September 2021 caused the link to be removed from service. National Grid announced that half of its capacity would be restored on 20 October 2021, with full capacity being restored by October 2023.

== 160 MW system (1961) ==
The first HVDC Cross-Channel scheme was built by ASEA and went into service in 1961, between converter stations at Lydd in England (next to Dungeness Nuclear Power Station) and Echinghen, near Boulogne-sur-Mer, in France. This scheme was equipped with mercury-arc valves, each having four anodes in parallel.

In order to keep the disturbances of the magnetic compasses of passing ships as small as possible, a bipolar cable was used. The cable had a length of 65 km (40 miles) and was operated symmetrically at a voltage of ±100 kV and a maximum current of 800 amperes. The maximum transmission power of this cable was 160 megawatts (MW). The cable was built by ABB. Given that the cable was laid on the surface of the seabed it was prone to being fouled by fishing nets, causing damage. Whilst repairs were undertaken there was considerable down time on the circuit resulting in a loss of trading. Indeed, by 1984 the circuit was disconnected from the Main Transmission System.

== 2,000 MW system (1986) ==
Because the first installation did not meet increasing requirements, it was replaced in 1975–1986 by a new HVDC system with a maximum transmission rating of 2,000 MW between France and the United Kingdom, for which two new converter stations were built in Sellindge, between Ashford and Folkestone in Kent, England and in Bonningues-lès-Calais (Les Mandarins station), near Calais, France. Unlike most HVDC schemes, where the two converter stations are built by the same manufacturer, the two converter stations of the 2,000 MW scheme were built by different manufacturers (although both have subsequently become part of the same parent company, Alstom). The Sellindge converter station was built by GEC and the Les Mandarins converter station was built by CGE Alstom.

This HVDC-link is 73 km (45 miles) long in route, with 70 km (43 miles) between the two ends. The undersea section consists of eight 46 km (29 miles) long 270 kV submarine cables, laid between Folkestone (UK) and Sangatte (France), arranged as two fully independent 1,000 MW Bipoles, each operated at a DC voltage of ±270 kV. Cables are laid in pairs in four trenches so that the magnetic fields generated by the two conductors are largely cancelled. The landside parts of the link consist of 8 cables with lengths of 18.5 km (11.5 miles) in England, and 6.35 km (3.95 miles) in France.

In common with the 1961 scheme, there is no provision to permit neutral current to flow through the sea. Although each station includes an earth electrode, this is used only to provide a neutral reference, and only one of the two electrodes is connected at a given time so that there can be no current flow between them.

The system was built with solid-state semiconductor thyristor valves from the outset. Initially these were air-cooled and used analogue control systems, and in 2011 and 2012 respectively, the thyristor valves of Bipole 1 and Bipole 2 were replaced by modern water-cooled thyristor valves and digital control systems supplied by Alstom.

This system remains the world's largest-capacity submarine cable HVDC system.

In November 2016, during Storm Angus, a ship dragging an anchor cut four of the eight cable components, reducing capacity by 50%. Repairs were completed by the end of February 2017. The equipment occasionally faults, causing capacity to drop: in a bad year, this might happen several times. To maintain grid frequency and power, the National Grid has a variety of frequency response assets, of which market batteries are the first to respond.

In September 2021, a major fire at the Sellindge converter station led to the shutdown of the link. National Grid initially announced that half of the link capacity would be restored within a fortnight, with full capacity being restored in March 2022. The shutdown came at a time of high prices and supply shortage in the UK electricity market, caused by low wind speeds and high prices for natural gas. On 15 October 2021, National Grid announced that half of the link capacity would be restored within the next few days, that 75% capacity would be available between October 2022 and May 2023, and that they hoped to restore full capacity by October 2023.

== Significance ==
Since the commissioning of the 2,000 MW DC link in the 1980s, the bulk of power flow through the link has been from France to Britain. However, France imports energy as needed during the winter to meet demand, or when there is low availability of hydroelectric power.

As of 2005, imports of electricity from France have historically accounted for about 5% of electricity available in the UK. Imports through the interconnector have generally been around the highest possible level, given the capacity of the link. In 2006, 97.5% of the energy transfers were made from France to UK, supplying the equivalent of 3 million English homes. Prior to the 2021 fire, the link availability was around 98%, which was among the best rates in the world. The continued size and duration of the flows are open to some doubt, given the growth in demand in continental Europe for clean electricity, and increasing electricity demand within France.

== Sites ==
Site	Coordinates
Echingen converter station	50°41′48″N 1°38′21″E
Lydd converter station	50°54′54″N 0°56′50″E
Les Mandarins converter station	50°54′11″N 1°47′5″E
Sellindge converter station	51°6′21″N 0°58′32″E

== See also ==
- IFA-2, 1,000 MW between the UK and France
- ElecLink, 1,000 MW link between the UK and France through the Channel Tunnel
- BritNed, 1,000 MW between UK and Netherlands
- Nemo Link, 1,000 MW between UK and Belgium
- List of HVDC projects in Europe
