= Ronchamp thermal power station =

Coal-fired power plant

Thermal power station of Ronchamp
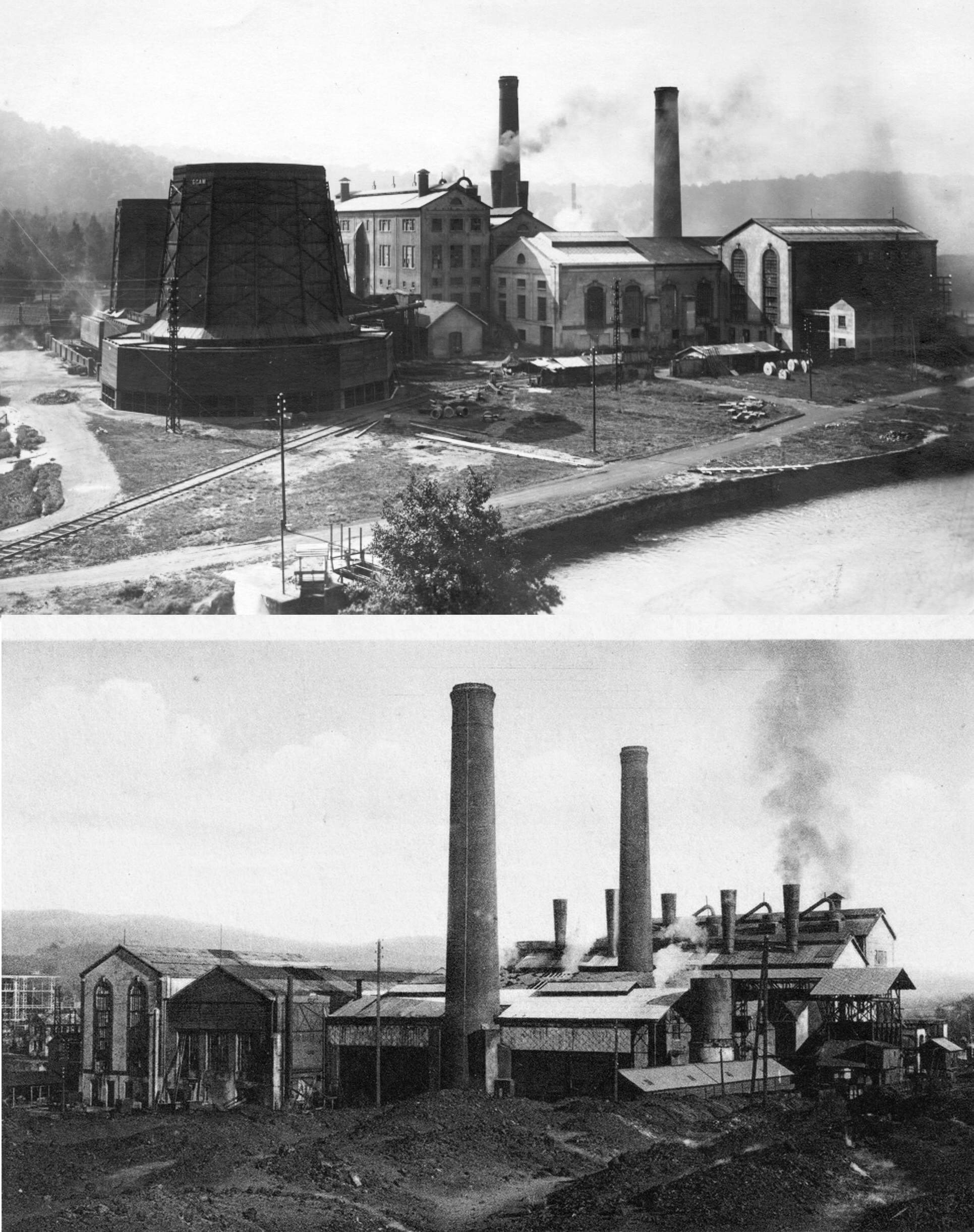
- The power station after 1924.
- Country: France
- Location: Bourgogne-Franche-Comté, Haute-Saône, Ronchamp
- Coordinates: 47°41′39″N 06°37′38″E
- Status: Decommissioned
- Commission date: 1907, 1910–1919, 1924
- Decommission date: 1958
- Owners: Houillères de Ronchamp (SHR) (1907–1946); EDF (1946–1958)

External links
- Commons: Related media on Commons

The Ronchamp thermal power station is a coal-fired power plant near the Chanois coal mine in the town of Ronchamp, Haute-Saône, in the French region of Bourgogne-Franche-Comté.

From the outset, in 1906-1907, until its nationalization in 1946, the station was operated by the Ronchamp coal mines. It then became the property of Électricité de France and remained so until its closure in 1958. The plant underwent two expansions between 1910 and 1924, increasing its capacity to 30 MW. Annual production ranged from 5 to 37 kWh until 1950.

After its closure in 1958, the plant was dismantled promptly. However, the buildings were gradually demolished throughout the latter half of the 20th century. By the early 21st century, only remnants and indications of the plant's former presence remained.

== Location ==
The plant is in Ronchamp, Haute-Saône department, Bourgogne-Franche-Comté region, France. The property is between the town center and the Chanois plain, near the Rahin riverbed. The plant's location forms a triangle with the Chanois coal mine, approximately 100 meters away, and the sorting, washing, and coking plant, situated 200 meters away. (Note: Verifiable positions and measurements on Géoportail.)

== History ==
=== Construction ===
In 1905, the Ronchamp coal mines strategically constructed a power plant, utilizing unsaleable washing waste (slurry) as a fuel source for the plant's boilers. Construction commenced the following year on the Chanois coal mine site, following architectural plans by Léon Poussigue, and was completed in one year (1906-1907). The boiler house is a brick-filled metal structure, while the machine and transformer houses are constructed of stone with brick ornamentation in a style similar to that of the Arthur de Buyer coal mine. The facility has three steam turbines, coupled to alternators, powered by two batteries of five boilers and transformers.

Construction of the boiler house in the summer of 1907.

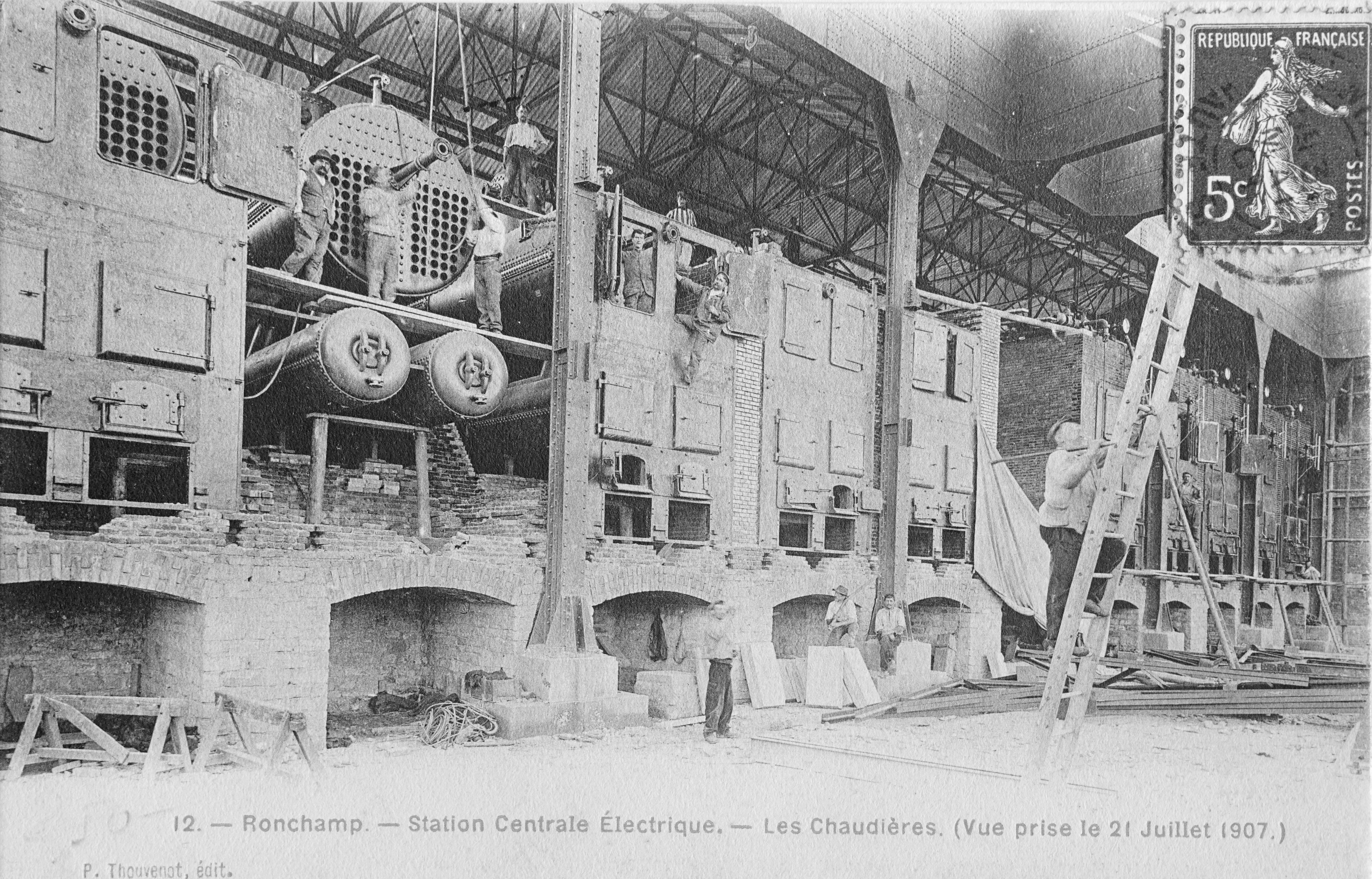
The boilers

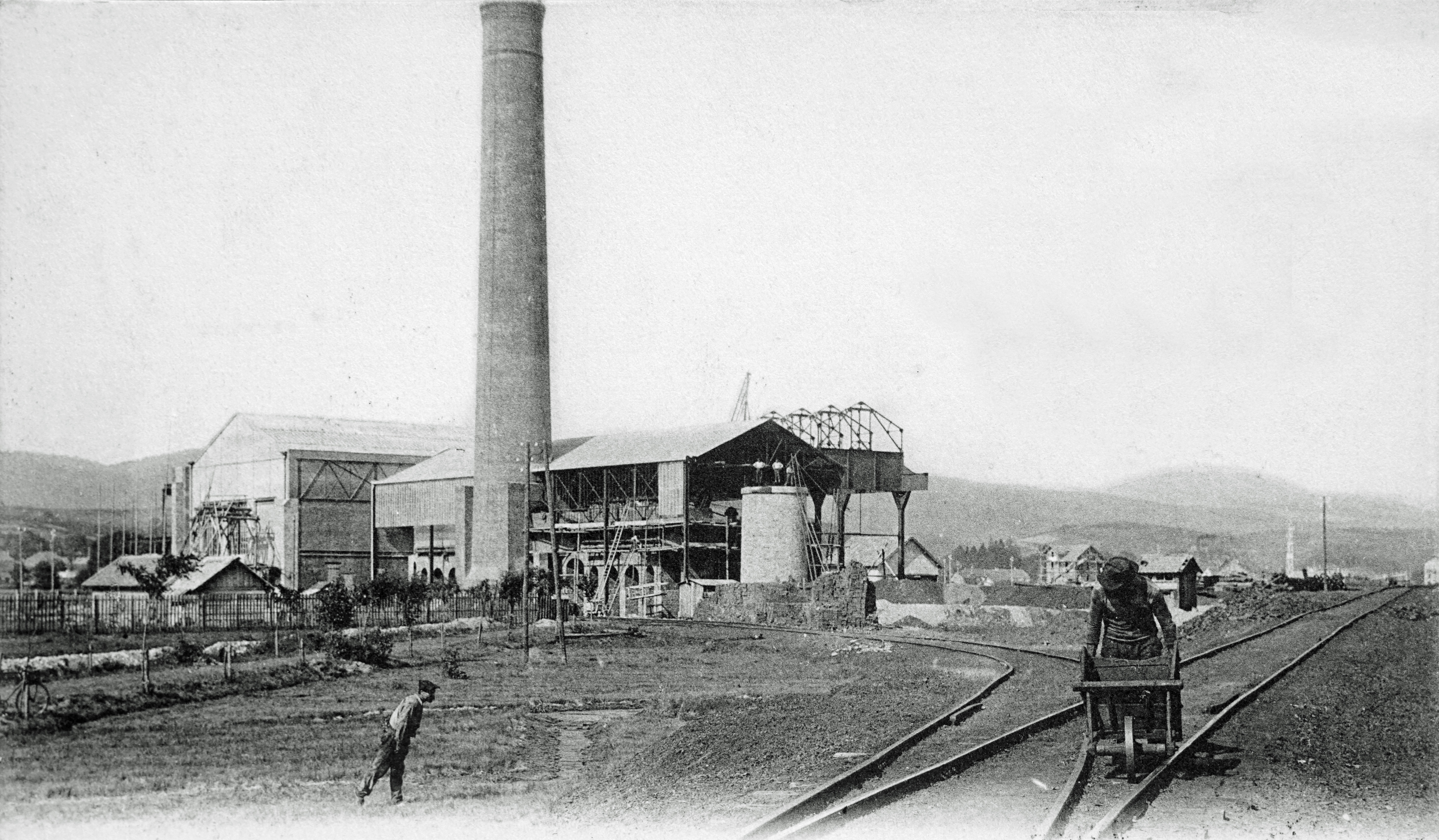
Overview of the same period.

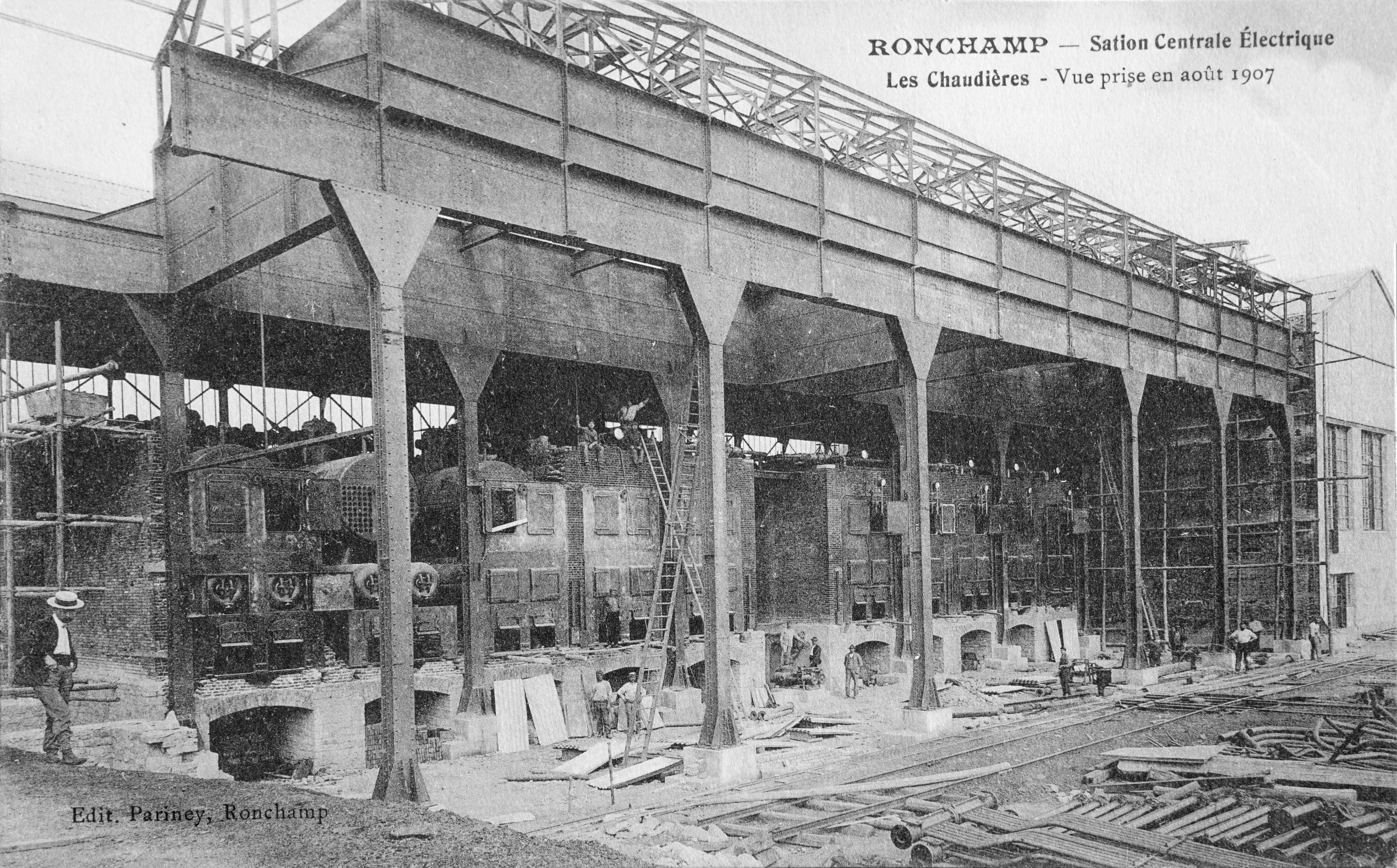

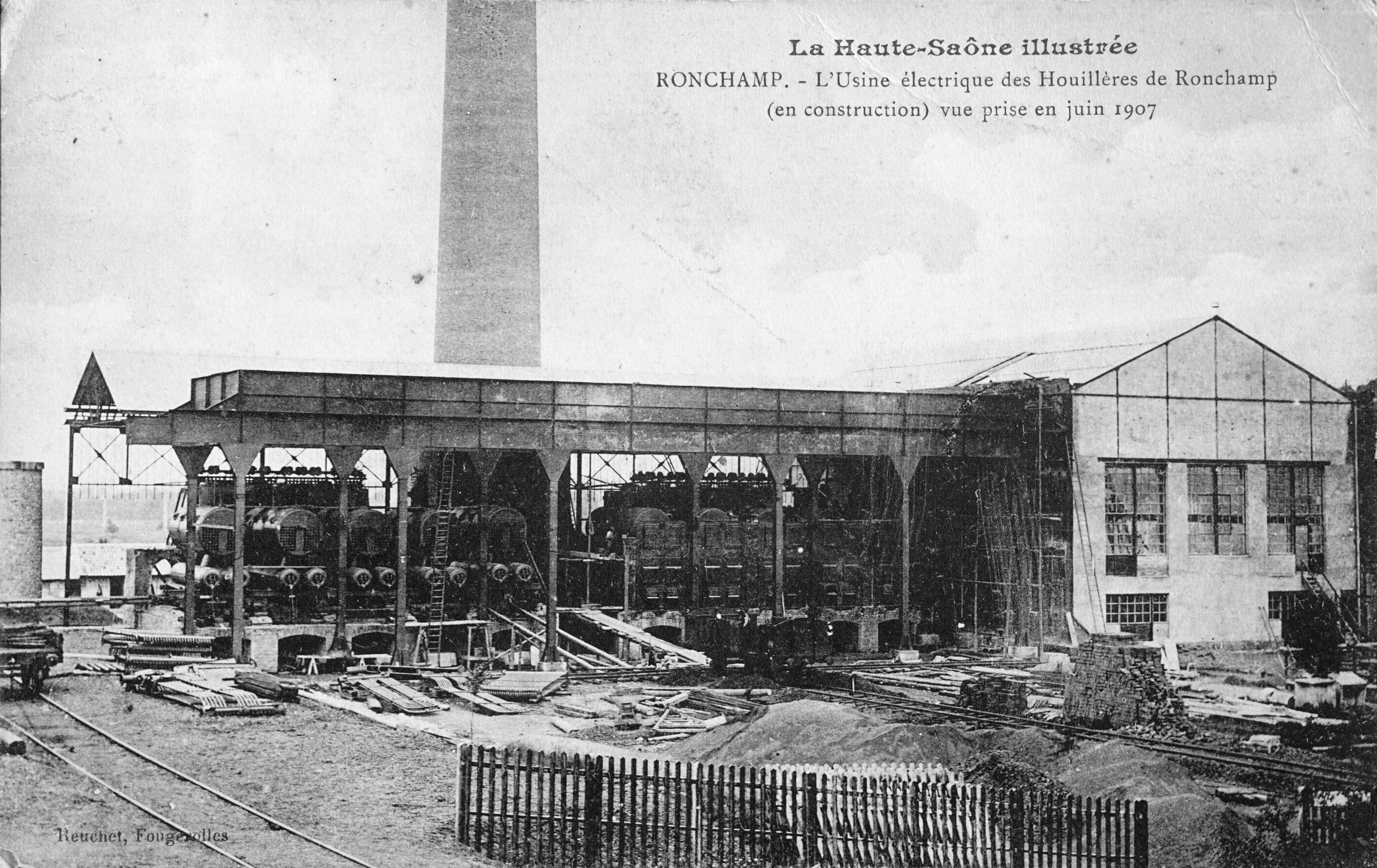

=== Expansions ===
Although the plant was modest in its beginnings, it was designed to expand step-by-step. Following a rapid expansion around 1910, the plant's boilers could no longer utilize washing waste as a fuel source, with all saleable coal consumed. As electricity production remained insufficient to meet growing demand, an agreement was reached with a Swiss hydroelectric power company to supply the Société de Ronchamp with several thousand kilowatts. The first electricity deliveries commenced in 1914. In 1912, the electric generators at the Gouhenans facilities were connected to the grid, providing additional power.

Before/during/after comparison of the first expansion with adding a second chimney.

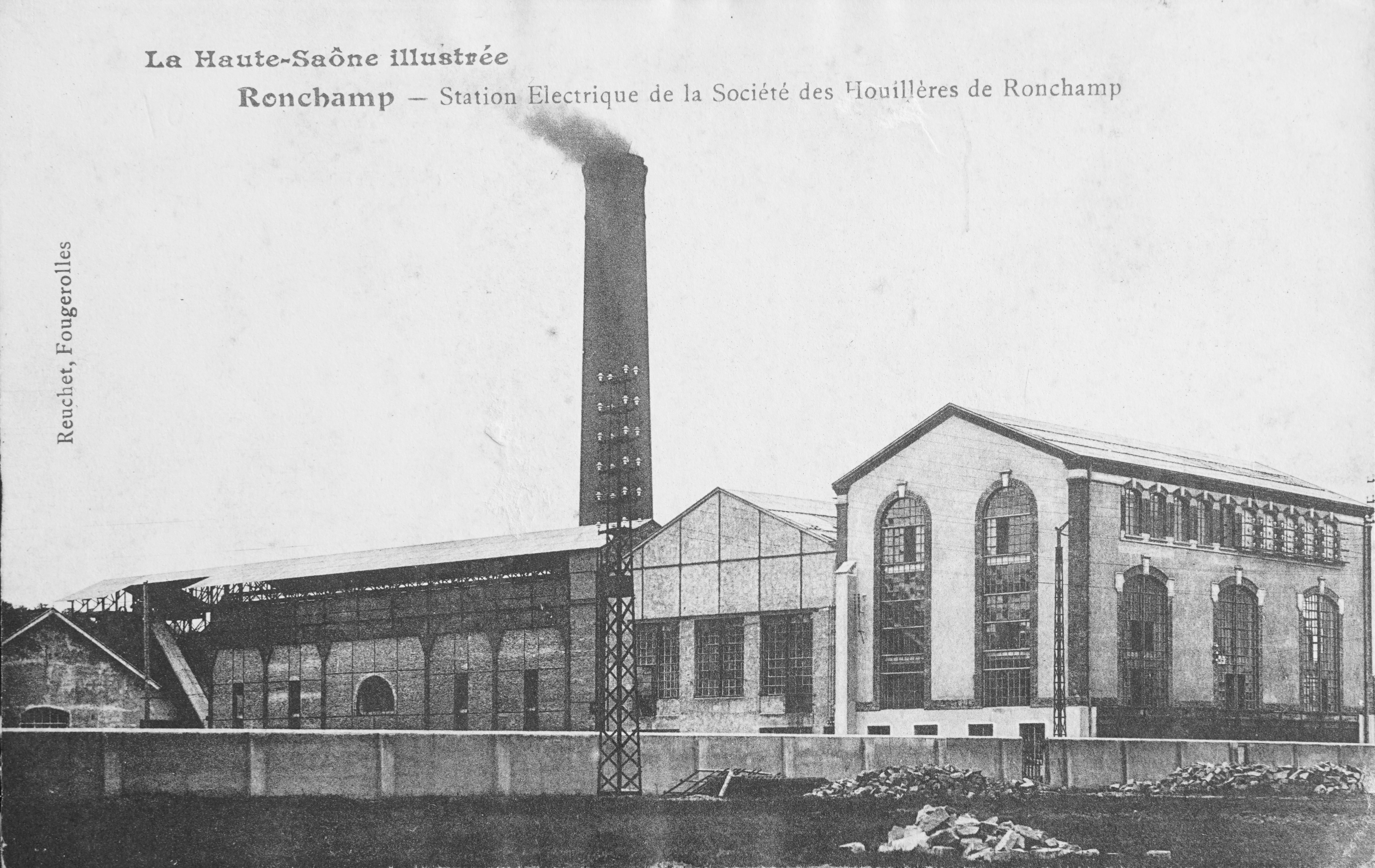
Before

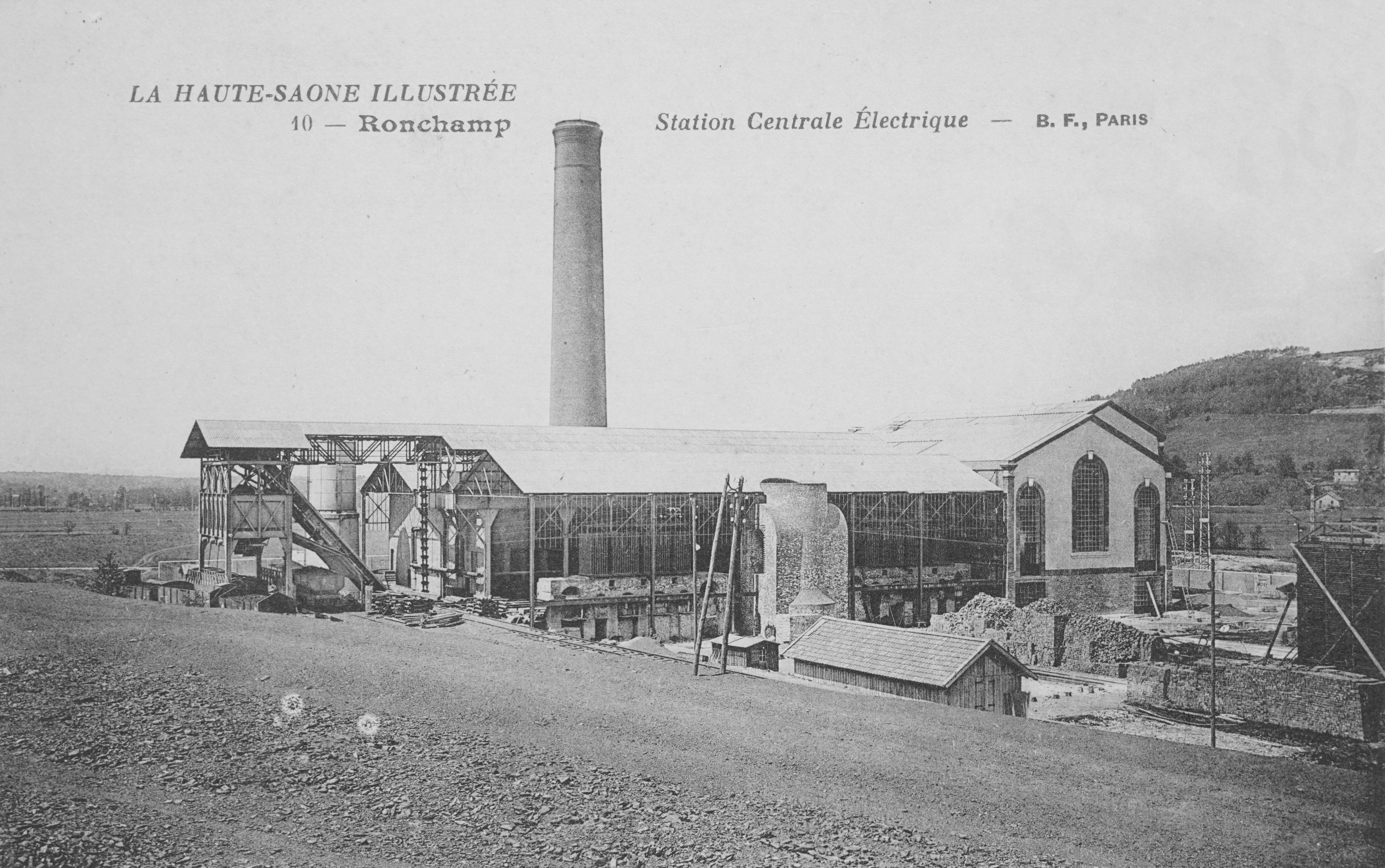
During

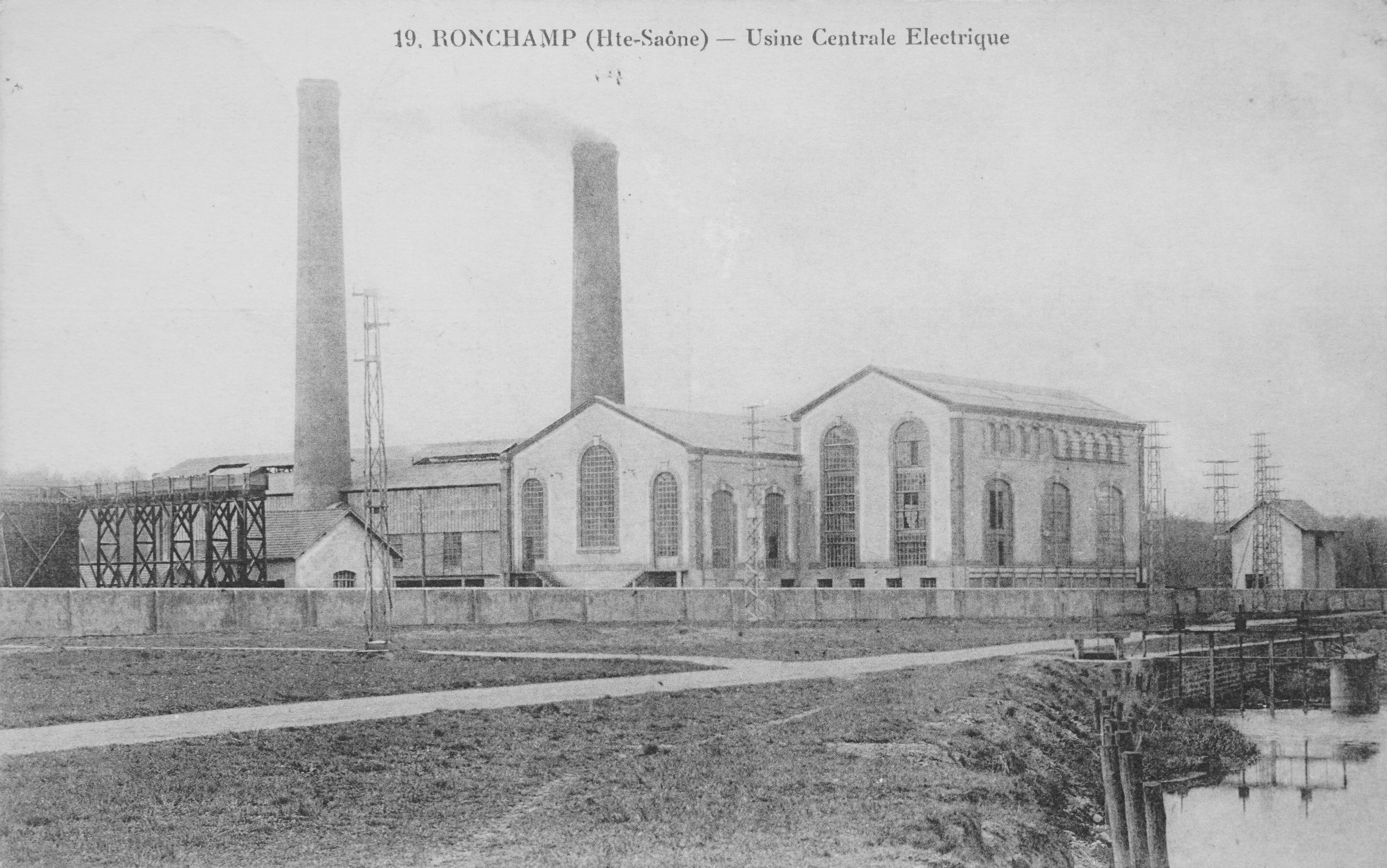
After

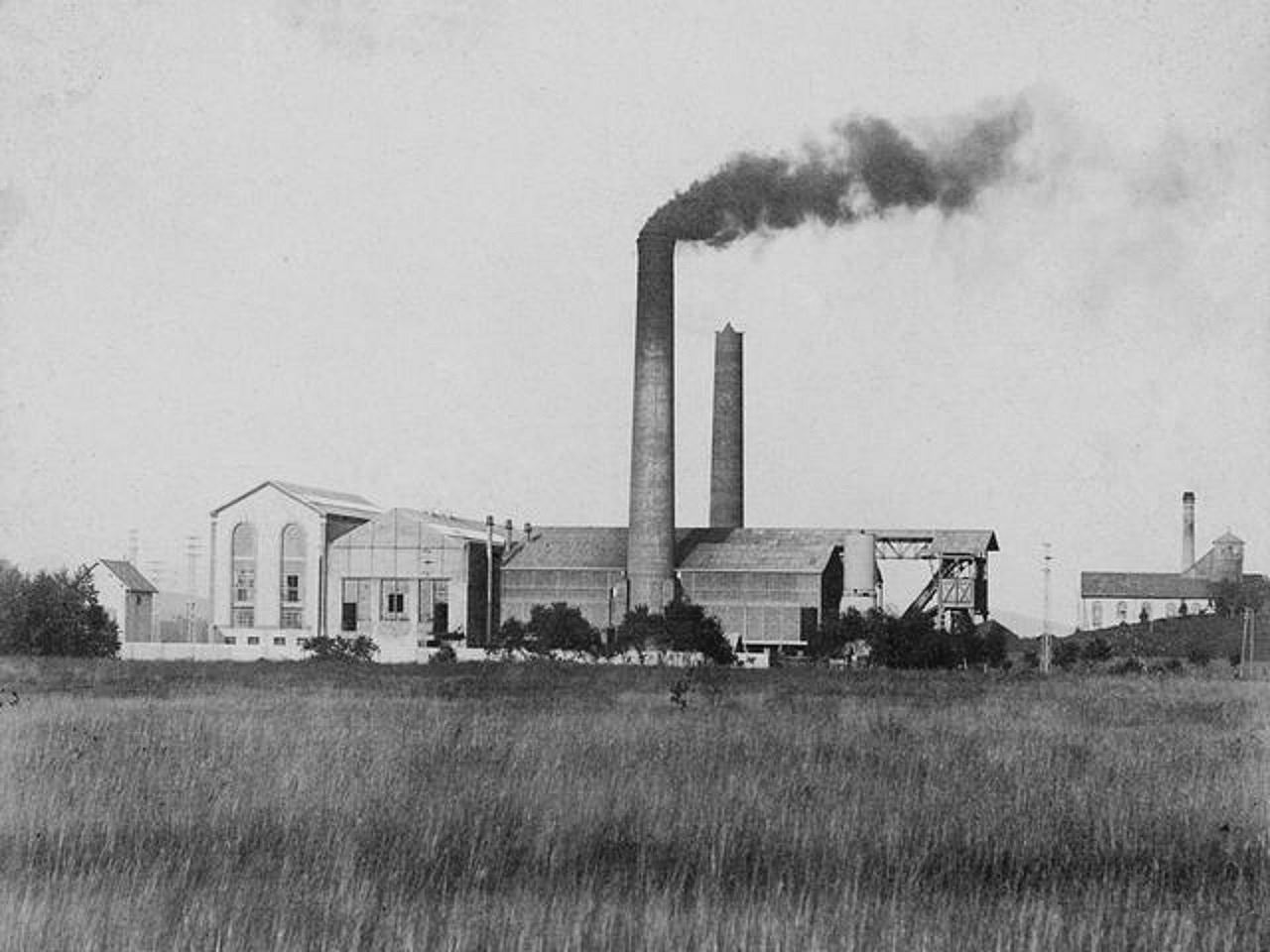
Distant view of the Chanois shaft

Following the conclusion of the First World War, electricity consumption in France and the Ronchamp power station significantly increased. This led to the installation of a new alternator at the Ronchamp power station and the development of hydroelectric power in Switzerland. By 1924, after several years of work, the Ronchamp electric service had a reasonably powerful installation with five turbo-alternators. In 1935, the coal mines integrated the Montbozon hydroelectric power station in Haute-Saône, which had generated electricity from the Ognon since 1893.

=== Nationalization ===
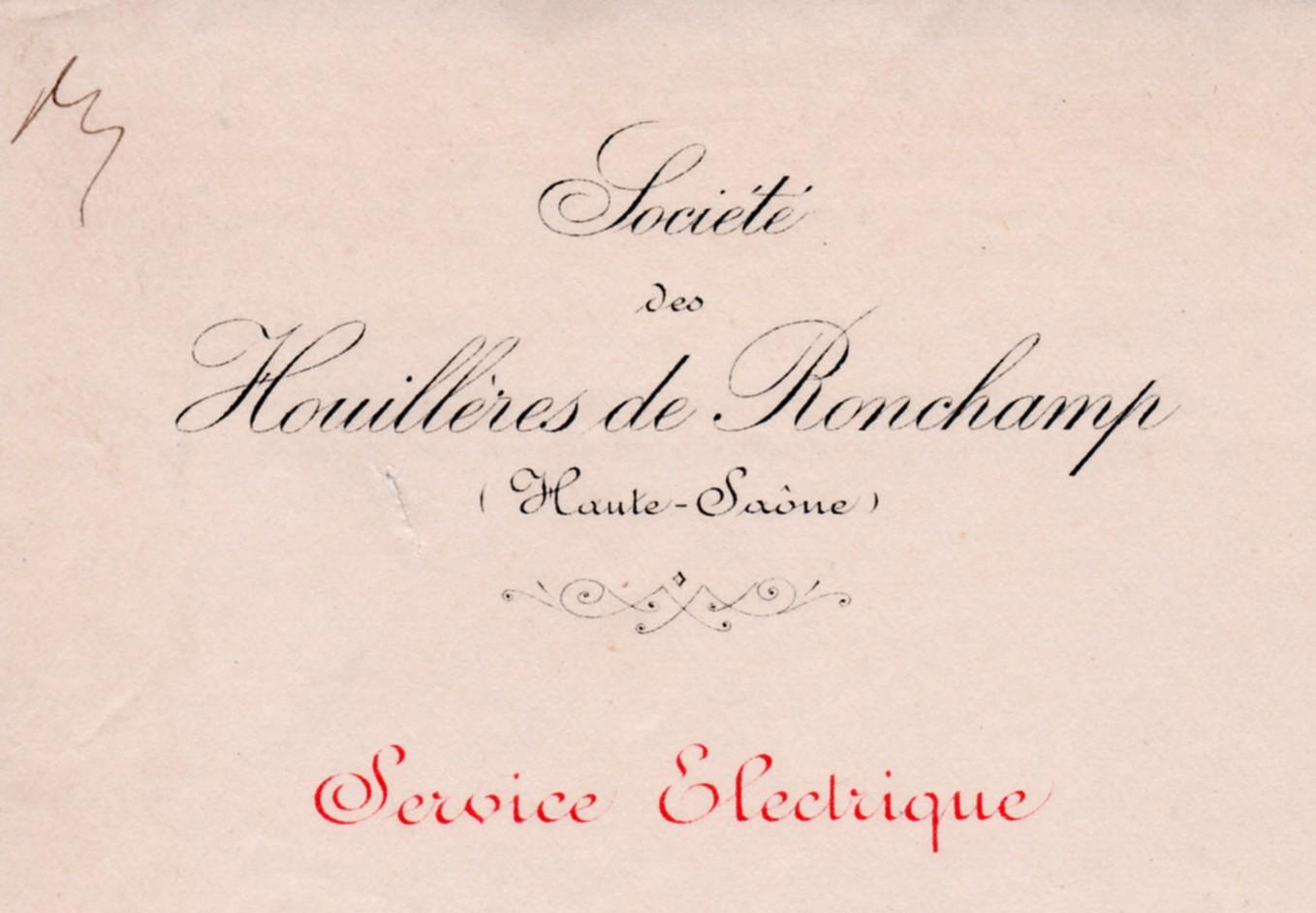
Letterhead of the coal-mining electric department in 1913.

In 1946, the French coal industry was nationalized under the direction of the Provisional Government, initially led by Charles de Gaulle. The Ronchamp coalfield was assigned to Électricité de France (EDF) due to its distance from other significant coalfields and a substantial thermal power station. The power station was connected to the national grid and served this purpose for twelve years.

In 1947, the Montagney Forge hydroelectric power station, constructed in 1922, commenced production operations within the power grid.

As early as 1950, EDF attempted to cease coal mining at Ronchamp. However, the miners established a mine defense committee to extend the mine's lifespan (or even restart it) and modernize the power station, citing its profitability. However, no modernization took place, and one pit after another was closed.

=== Dismantling ===
Following the closure of the mines in 1958, the thermal power station, no longer required, was swiftly dismantled and partially demolished in the 1960s. This resulted in the remaining structures, namely the tallest building, a truncated chimney, and the base of the water tower, being left in disrepair. The remaining structures, including the water tower and a few small converted buildings, were demolished in 1991 to make way for a car manufacturer. (Note: Aerial photography missions available on Géoportail by year.)

== Facilities ==
=== Fuel ===
The power plant utilizes hard coal, which is extracted directly on-site at the local mines' four coal mines and then in the Ronchamp and Champagney coalfields during operation. From a geological standpoint, it is situated within the western sector of the Saint-Étienne sub-Vosges coalfield, which represents the most economically viable and accessible portion of the basin.

The surroundings of the Chanois coal mine and power station in 1949 Rail tracks Forested areas Mining buildings Slag heaps Mining towns Water bodies Other constructions

Name	Location	Distance	Transport	Supply time
Magny Coal Mine	47°41′16″N 6°38′00″E	0.8 km	Track	1907–1916; 1927–1958
Chanois Coal Mine	47°41′36″N 6°37′47″E	0.1 km	Track	1907–1951
Arthur de Buyer Coal Mine	47°40′37″N 6°36′51″E	2.1 km	Track	1907–1954
Étançon Mine	47°42′33″N 6°38′46″E	2.2 km	Road transport	1950–1958

=== The power station ===
The initial configuration of the plant includes three Zoelly steam turbines coupled to 1,500-kilowatt alternators. The turbines were fed by two batteries of five semi-tubular boilers with superheaters and green reheaters, each with 250 m^{2} of heating surface. The primary current, at 5,000 volts and 50 hertz, was boosted to 30,000 volts by 1,500 kW static transformers, except that sent directly to nearby distribution cabins. Following its construction, the power station expanded, adding a 3,000 kW turbine and automatic fireplaces to its boilers. Following the Armistice of the First World War, a 6,000 kW alternator was installed, with subsequent additions of alternators of lesser power in 1924, resulting in a total capacity of 16.5 MW.

By 1924, the power station was in its final configuration. The boiler hall comprised four batteries of five semi-tubular boilers, with a total heating surface area of 570 m^{2}. The boilers delivered steam at 18 kg/cm^{2} pressure, superheated to 375°C. Two 50-meter chimneys are used to evacuate fumes. The engine room is served by an overhead crane and houses five main turbo-alternators: three of 1.5 MW, one of 3 MW, one of 6 MW, and others less powerful, providing a total output of 30 MW (half that of the Lucy I power plant at Montceau-les-Mines in Saône-et-Loire, one of the largest coal-fired power plants in France between the wars). In May 1954, the final output was limited to 16 MW, and another building was constructed to accommodate the alternators' transformation and control of the current.

Facilities after 1924 Rail tracks Boiler buildings 1907 (pale), 1910 (light), 1924 (dark) Turboalternator buildings 1907 (pale), 1910 (light), 1924 (dark) Transformer buildings and control room Boiler loading Water towers Air coolers Other mining buildings Mining towns Other buildings

The interior of the machine room and turbine converters.

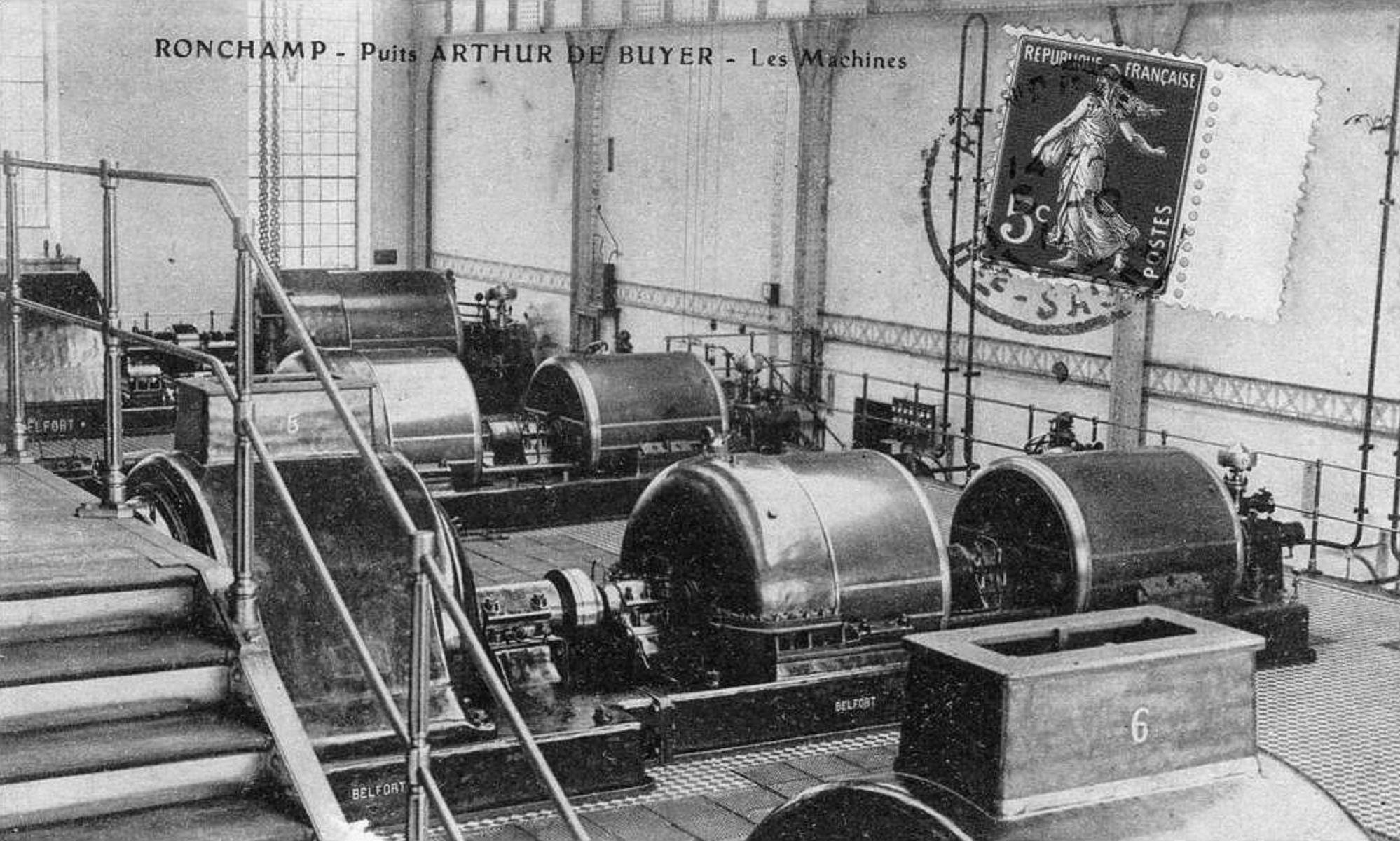

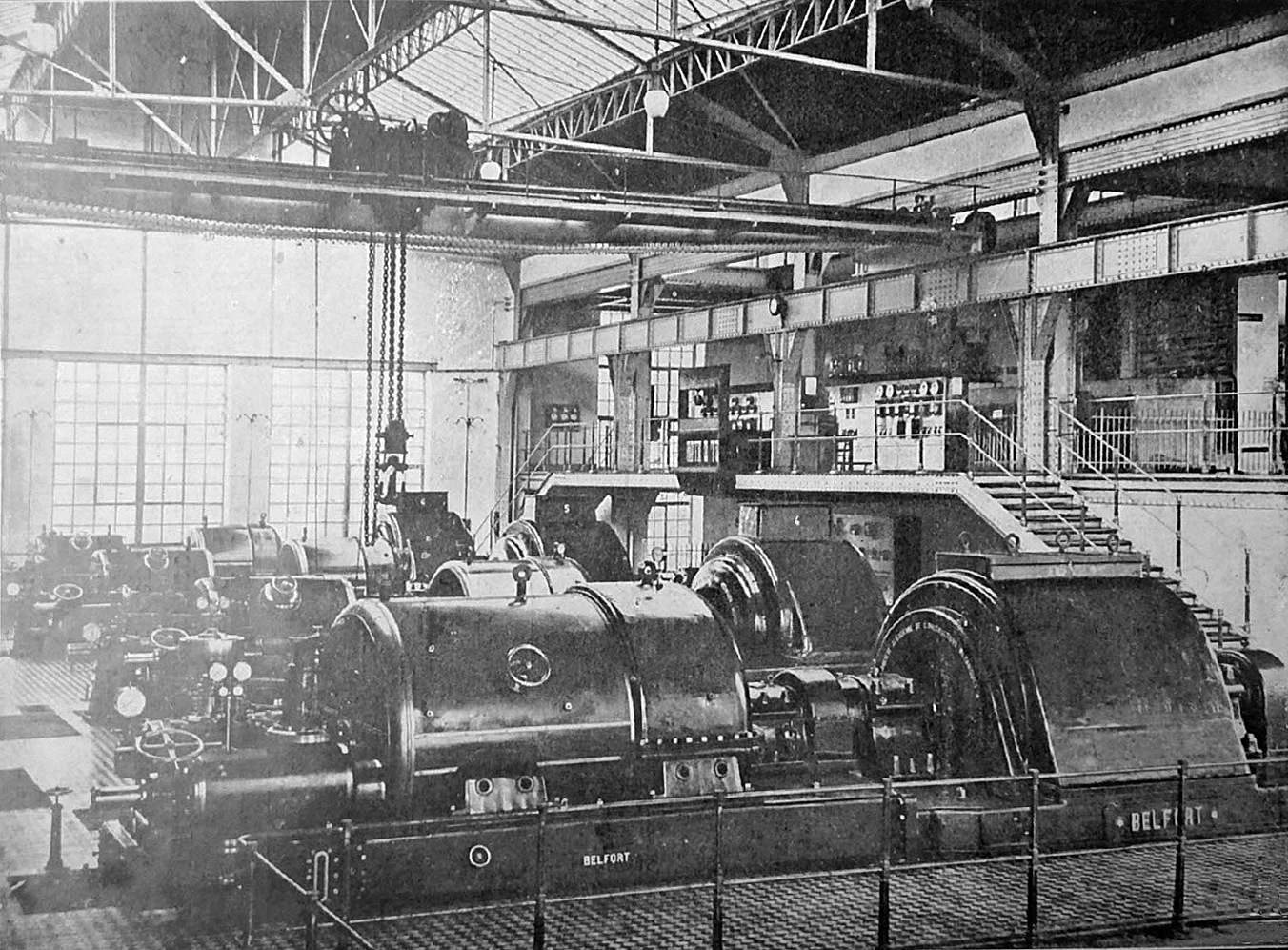

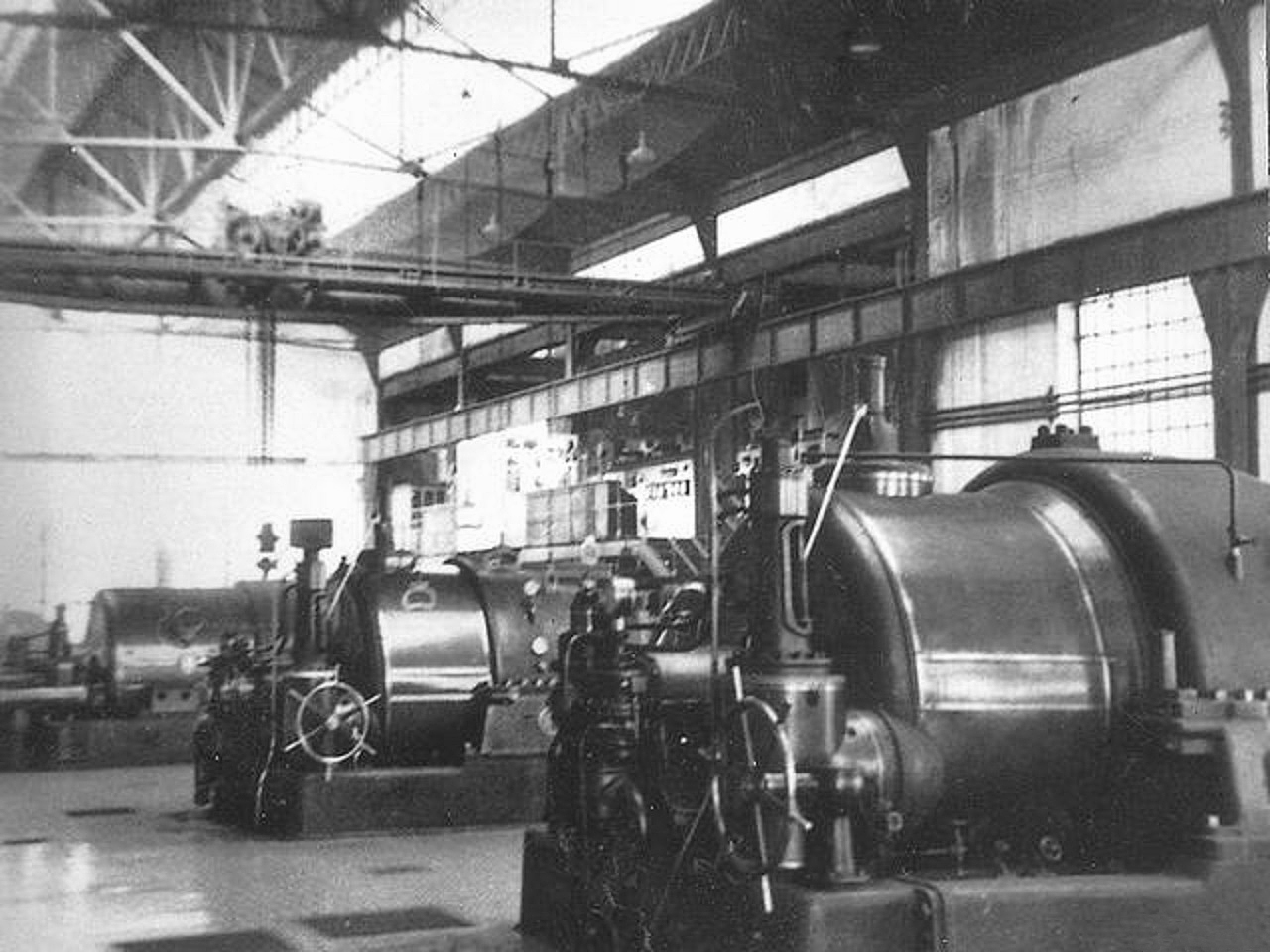

=== Ronchamp substation ===
The Ronchamp electrical substation is situated on an independent site less than 200 meters north of the power plant, opposite the River Rahin. Multiple bridges provide convenient access between the two locations. This site is home to the outgoing feeder for the network's high-voltage lines and the substation that supplies power directly to residents. Following the power station's closure, the site was operated by EDF and subsequently by RTE.

The substation's various infrastructures have been modernized multiple times, with no original elements remaining at the beginning of the 21st century. Furthermore, some of the 150,000-volt lines that depend on it have been decommissioned. These include the Ronchamp-Fougerolles-Plombières line, which was decommissioned at the end of 2010 following its prolonged period of inactivity since 1996, and the Ronchamp-Étupes line, which was decommissioned in 2008 after a 24-kilometre lifespan. In 2013, four lines were connected to the Ronchamp substation. In 2017, a project to construct nine wind turbines in Saulnot will distribute some of the energy produced via the Ronchamp substation. In 2020, a photovoltaic power station project on the Chanois slag heaps will also utilize the substation for distribution.

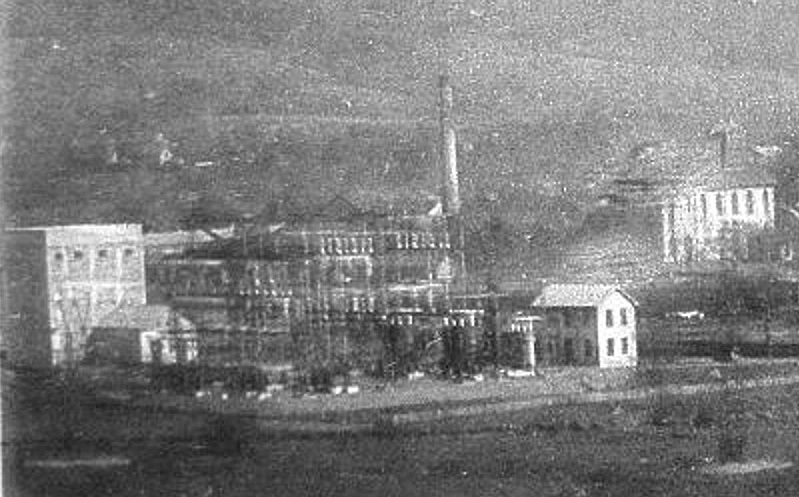
The Ronchamp substation and the Chanois coal mine.

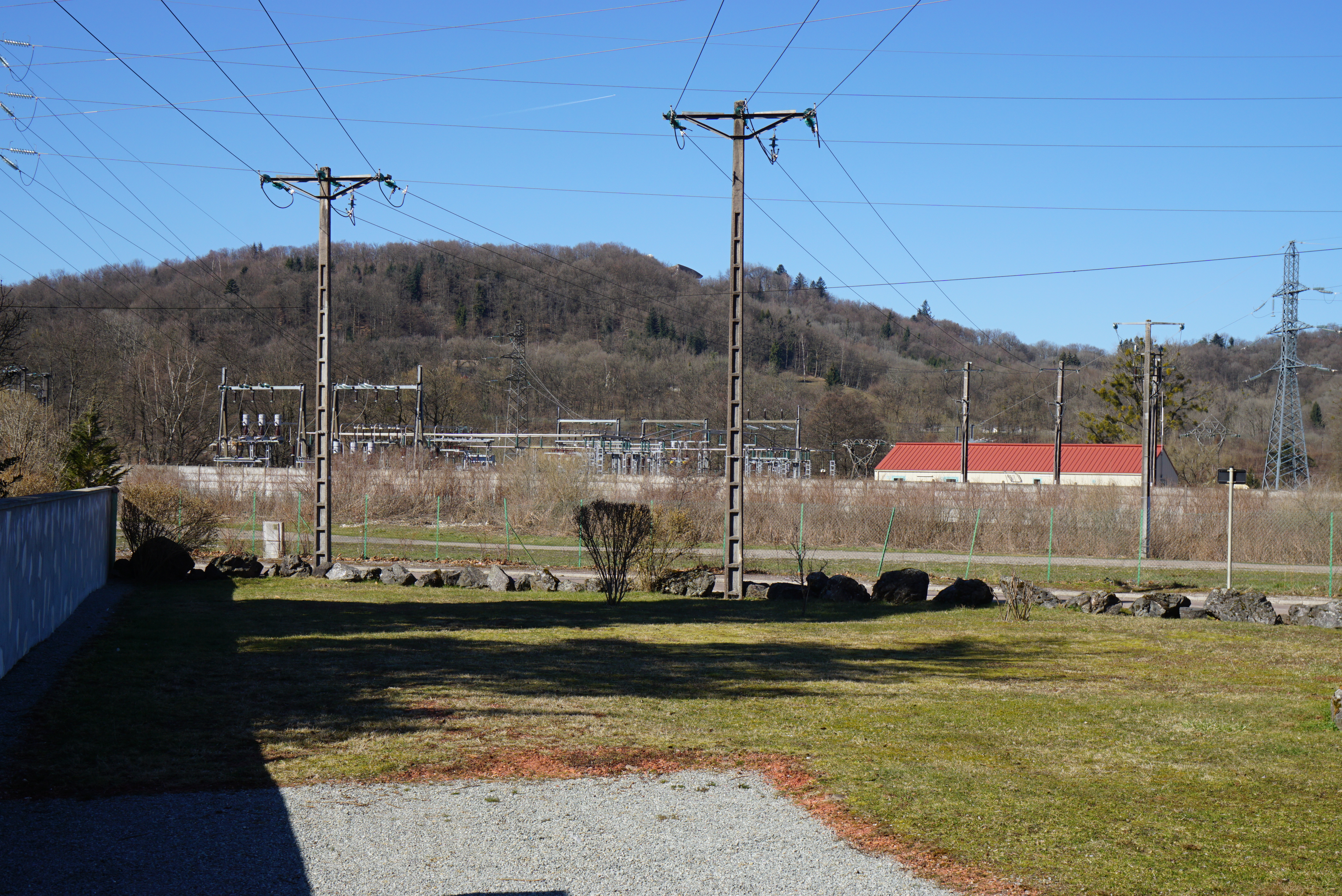
Overview

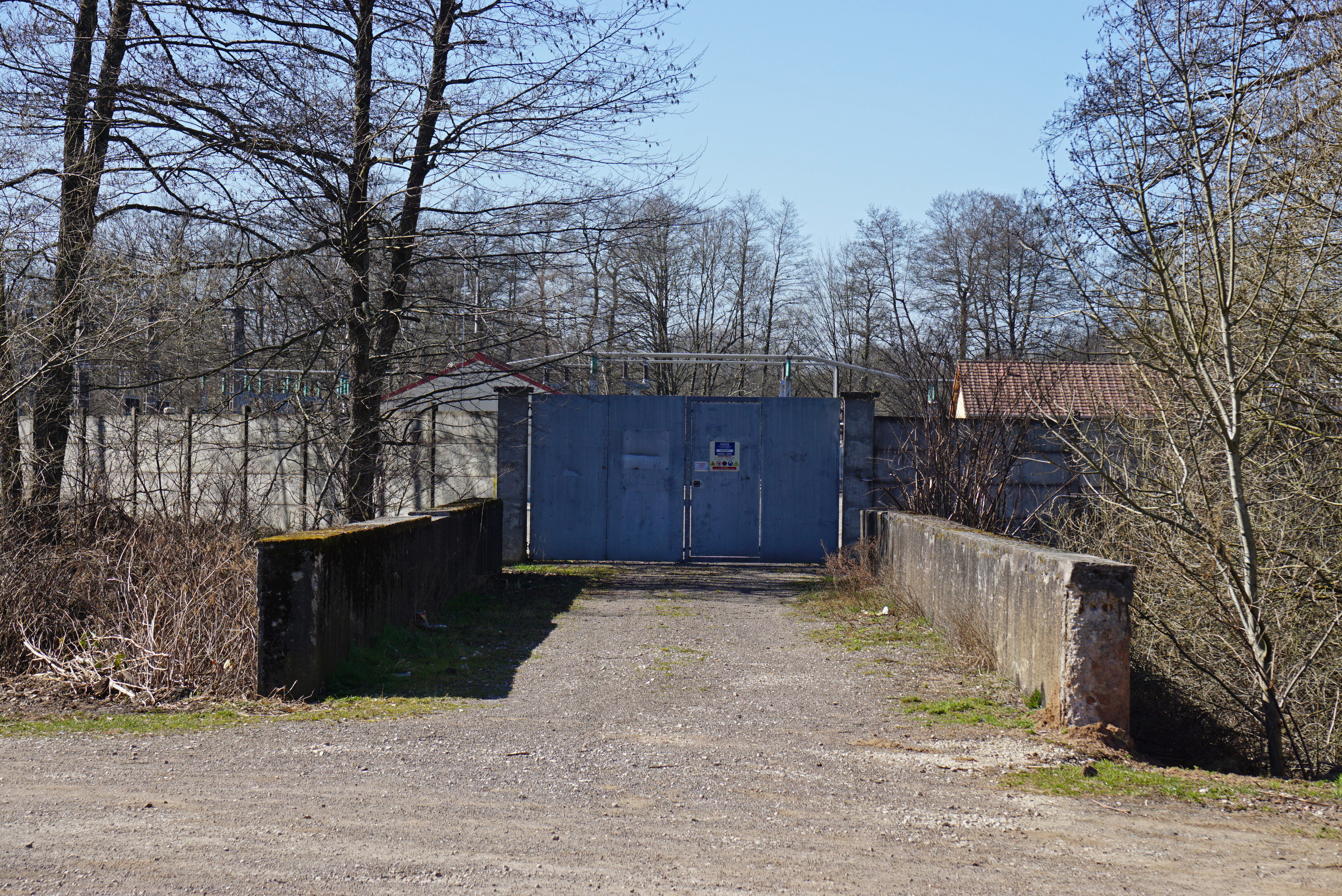
Access bridge

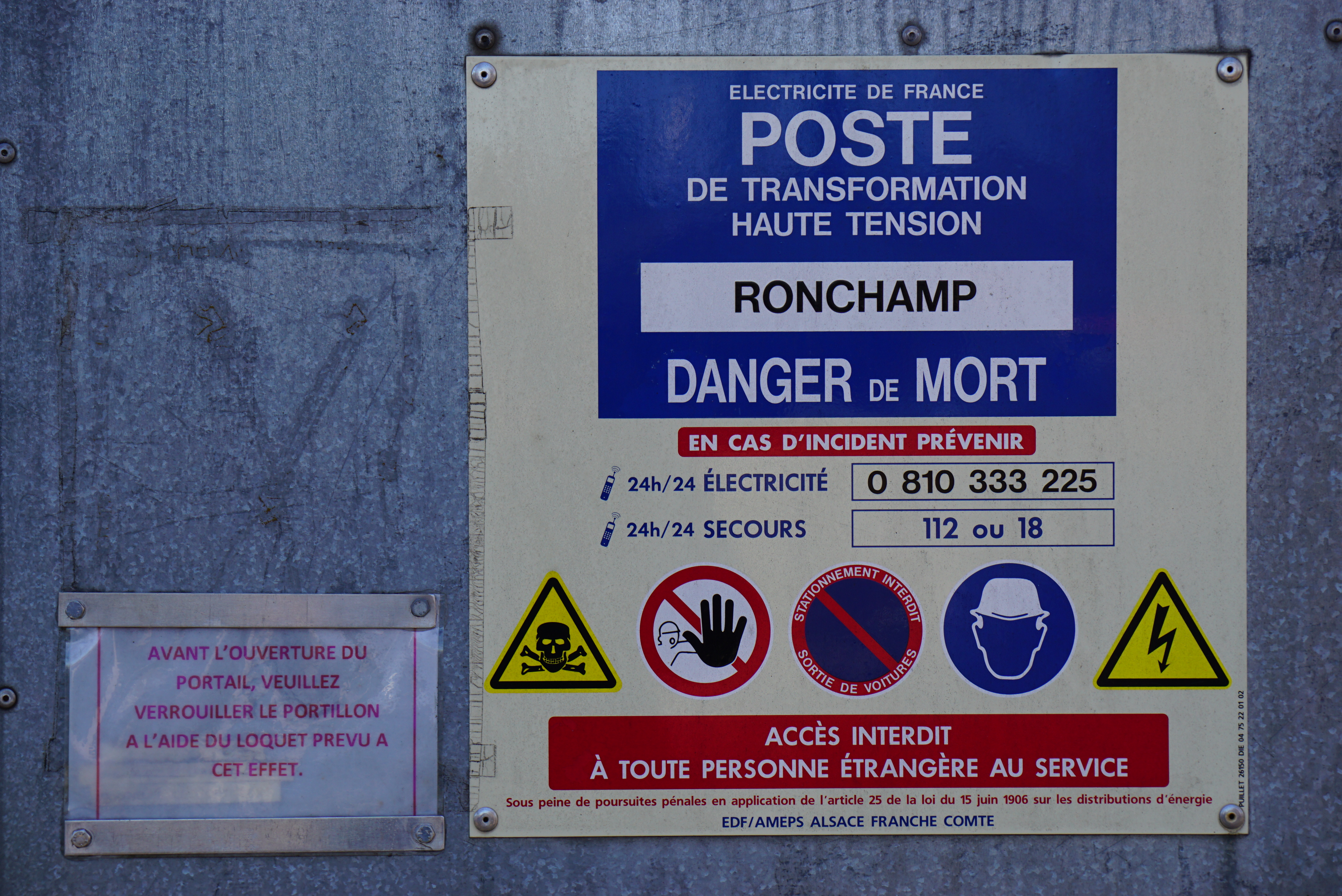
Signage

=== Network ===
The electrical grid comprises numerous transformer substations, including those in Belfort, Frahier, Giromagny, Plancher-Bas, Lure, Luxeuil, Fougerolles, Val d'Ajol, and Le Thillot. The Ronchamp thermal power station serves 62 communes, and 600 kilometers of lines supply the region with electricity.

The company has 5,500 customers for lighting and 650 for motorization, representing a power output of 17.245 MW. This requires the installation of 250 transformers and 3,500 meters. The lines are divided by voltage: 60 km at 55,000 volts, 240 km at 30,000 volts, 200 km at 5,000 volts, and 100 km at low voltage. In 1913, the coal mines' electrical network provided power to the local railway in the Territoire de Belfort, which utilized electric railcars. The Belfort substation offers service to this network. 1922, the contract was not renewed, and the railroad opted for steam traction. Following an agreement with a Swiss hydroelectric company, a reception and control station was constructed in the commune of Réchésy, along with a power line from this station to another in Belfort. The voltage was reduced from 55,000 to 30,000 volts at this transformer station.

To construct new lines, the coal companies typically entered into agreements with the relevant municipalities to obtain a concession and assume responsibility for the felling and resale of trees required for construction. This was the case with Champagney in October 1931 for the construction of the Ronchamp-Andelnans line. The commune granted a 36-year renewable concession for 1,815 francs a year. A total of 1,625 meters of the communal forest was traversed, with trees being felled over an area of sixteen meters. The sale of these trees generated 3,995 francs for the municipality.

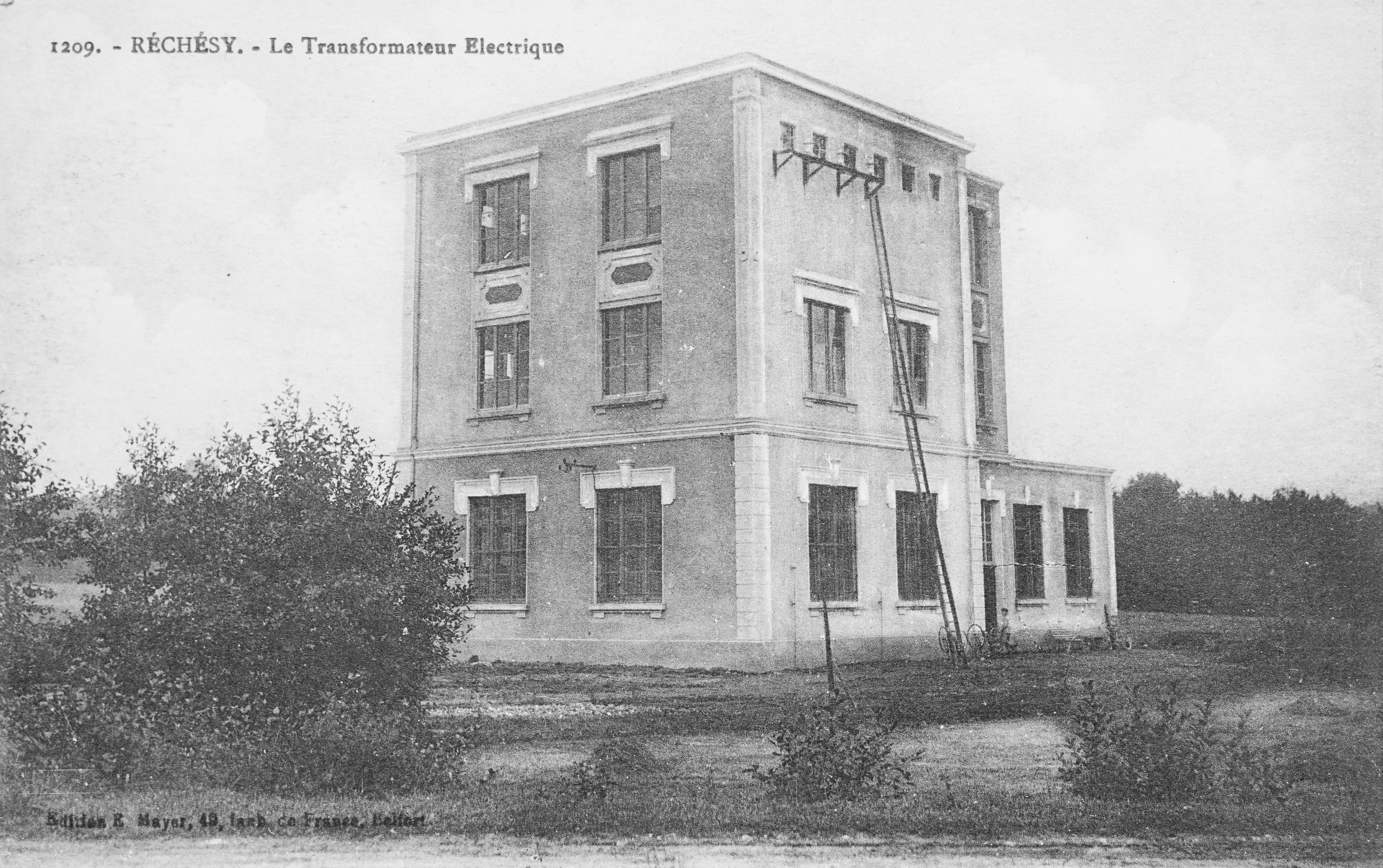
Réchésy station in 1917.

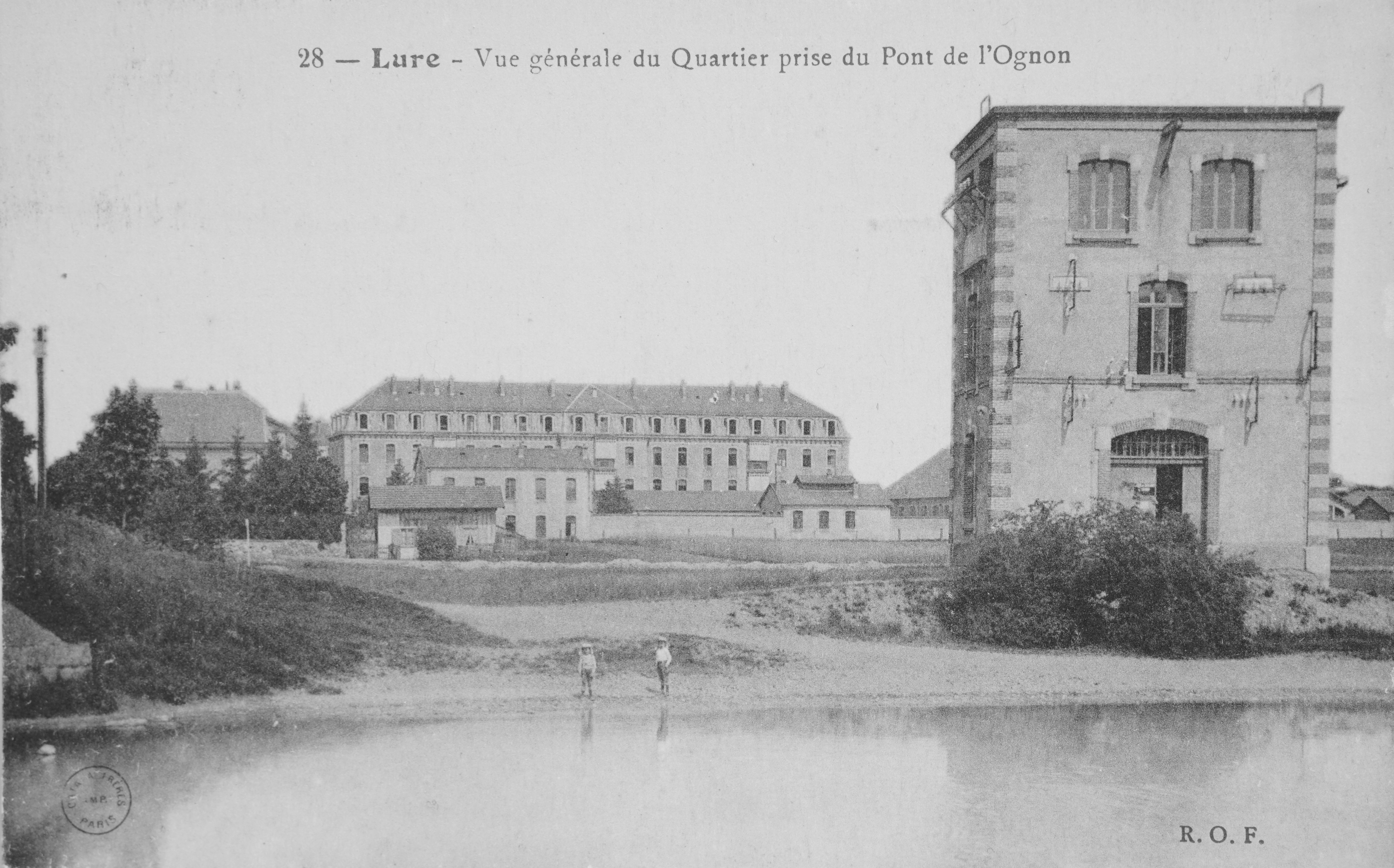
Lure station in operation.

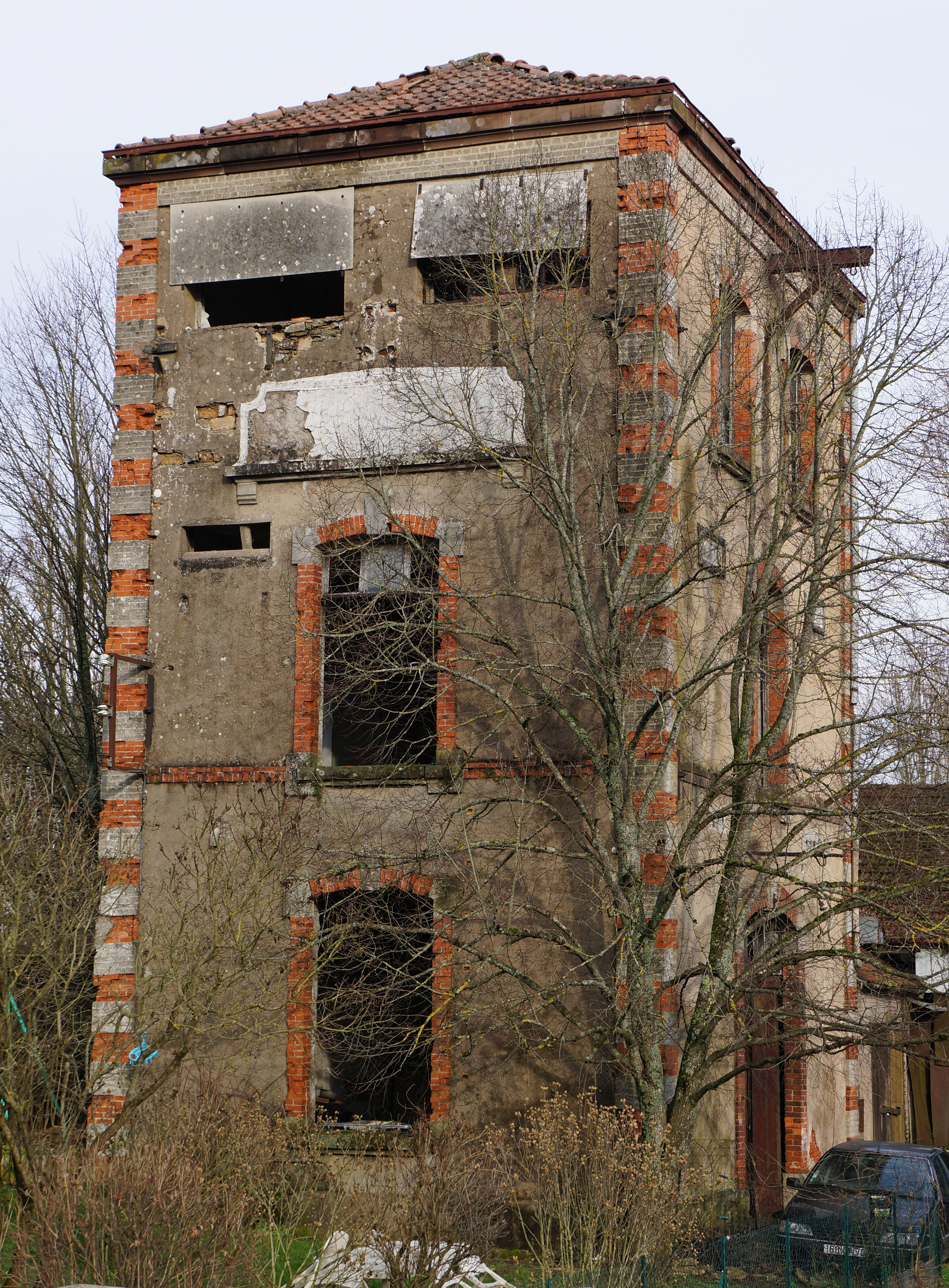
Lure station in 2013.

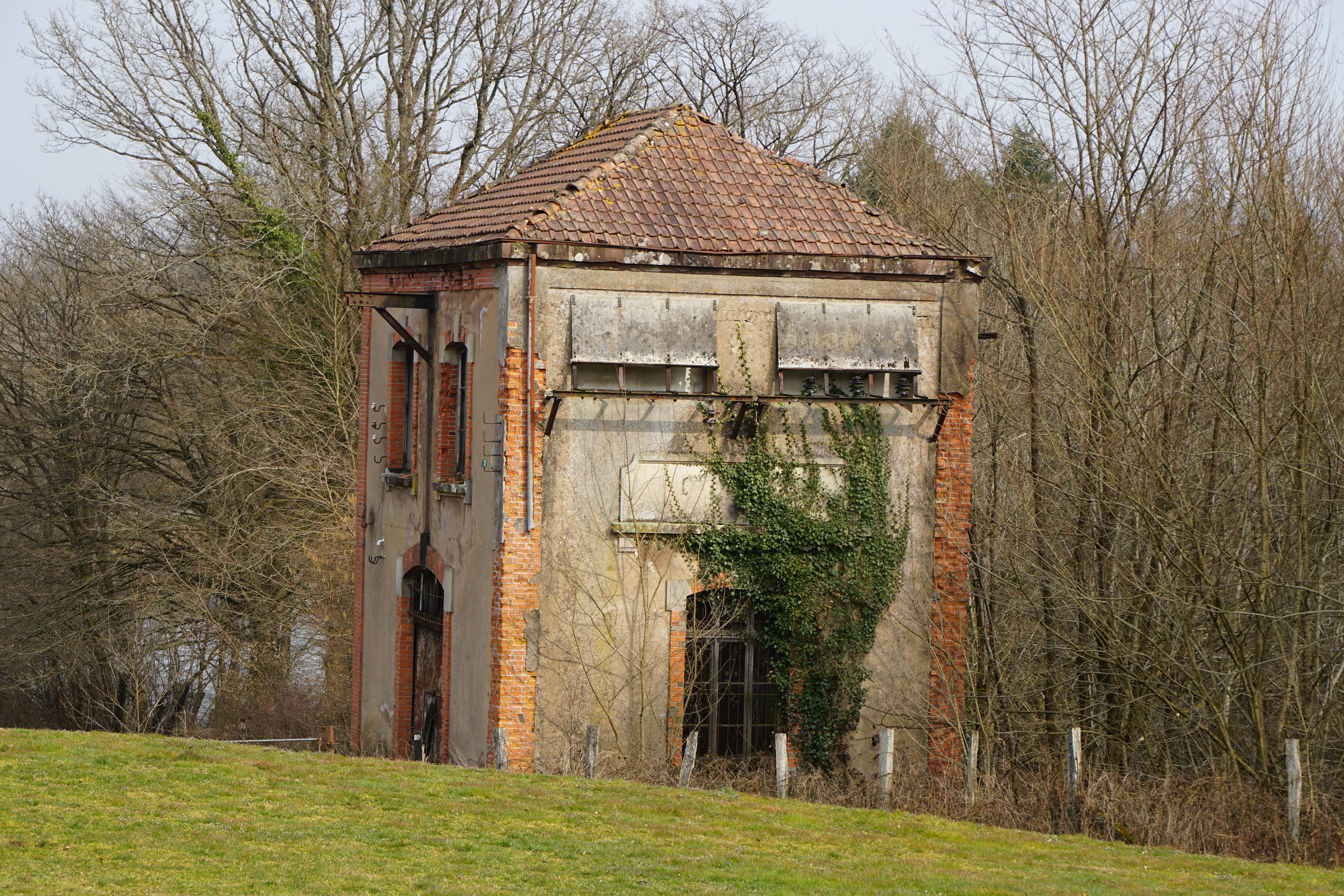
Frahier station.

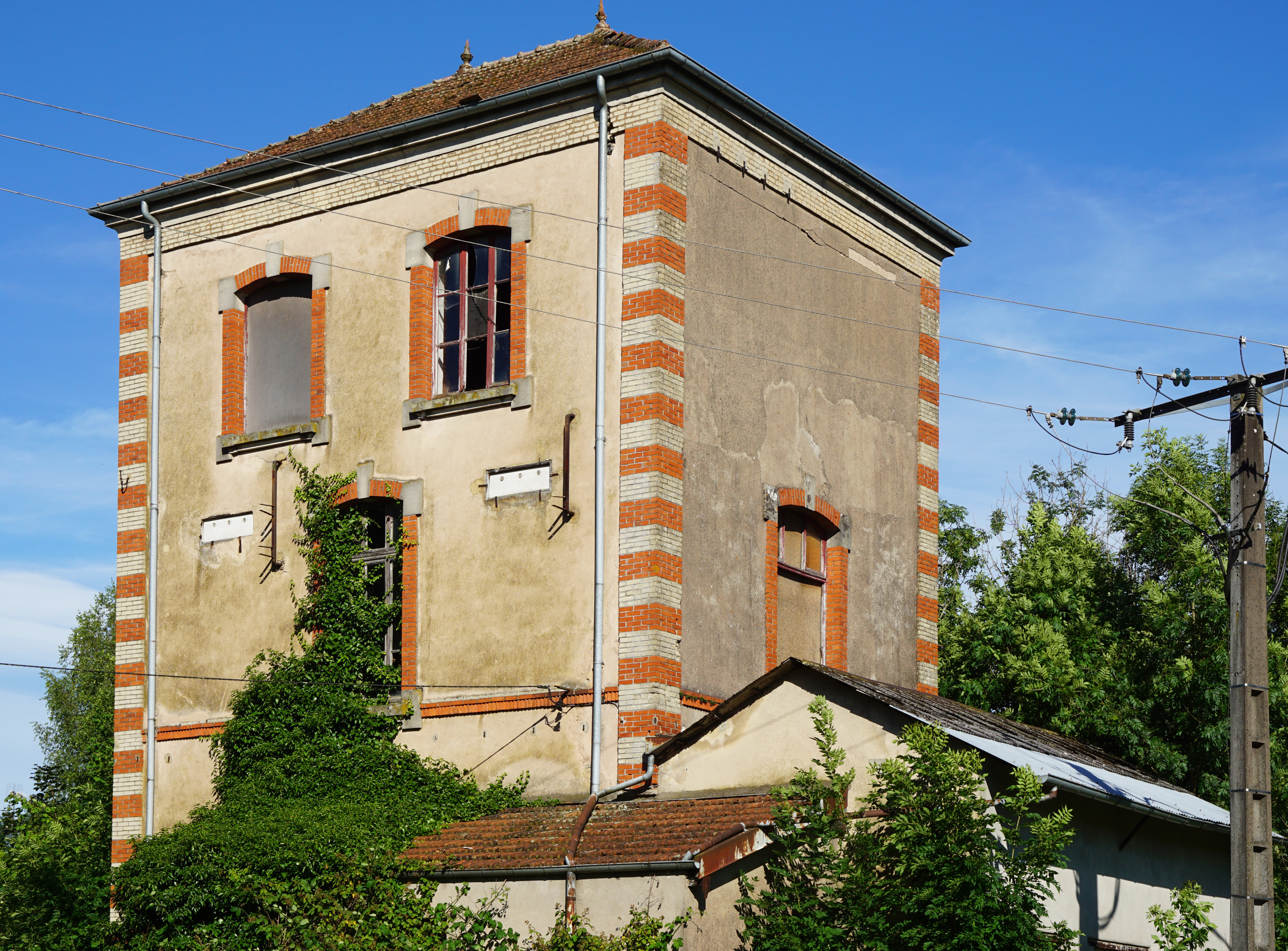
Fougerolles station.

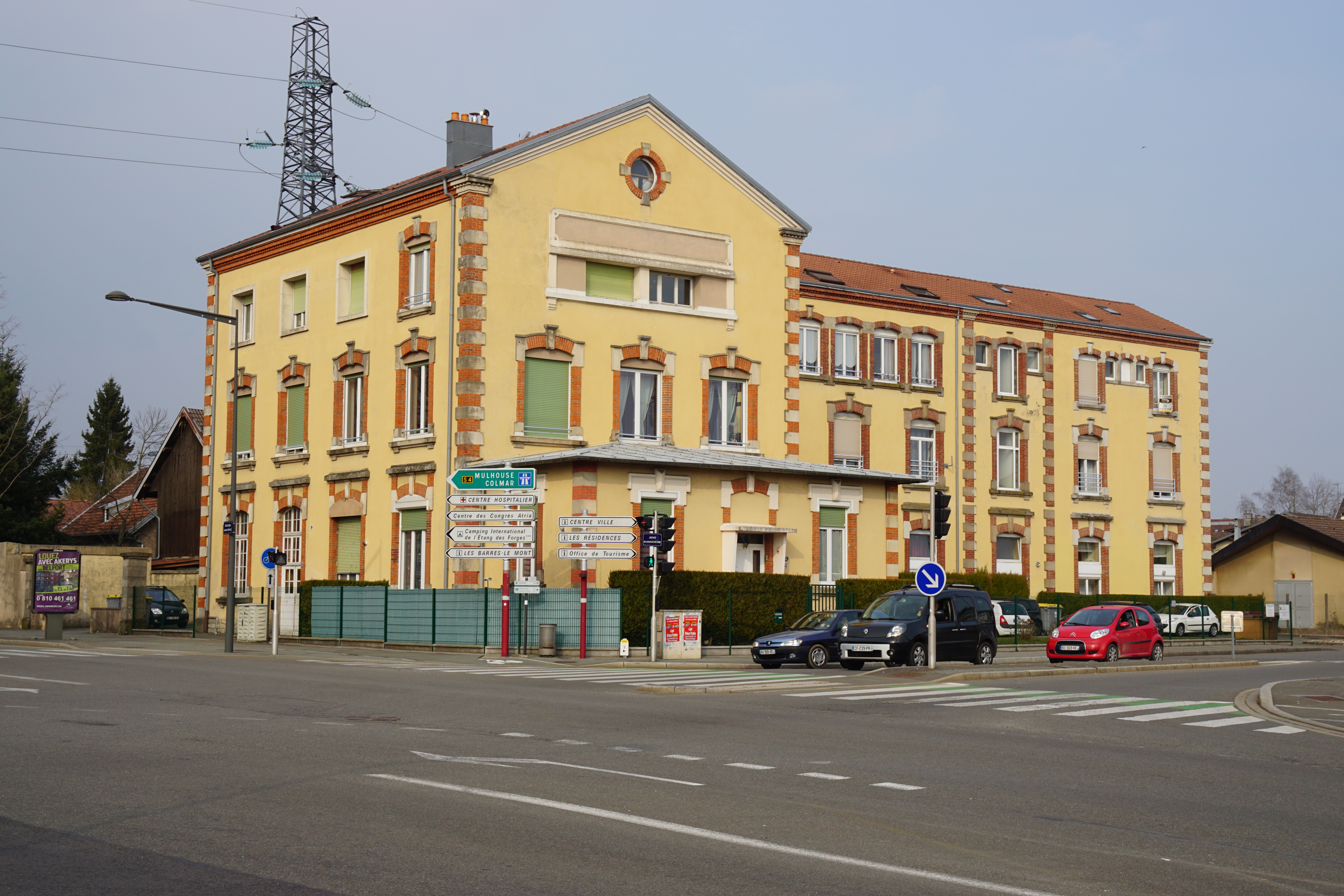
Essert station, Belfort.

== Production ==
Before the conclusion of the expansion, production levels remained relatively low, seldom exceeding 10 kWh per year. From 1924 to 1950, annual production ranged from 5.1 kWh (1924) to 36.3 kWh (1949). During this period, the plant consistently operated with annual capacity factors between 2% and 15% of capacity. The plant reached a capacity factor of 25% on two occasions: in 1929 and again in 1949.

Production performance
	1920	1922	1924	1926	1928	1930	1932	1934	1936	1938	1940	1942	1944	1946	1948	1950
Production in kWh	11,8	2,8	5,1	12,0	21,5	13,2	10,0	17,8	16,3	16,4	6,7	5,5	7,2	15,9	21,6	15,9

	1921	1923	1925	1927	1929	1931	1933	1935	1937	1939	1941	1943	1945	1947	1949
Production in kWh	10,0	4,8	5,5	18,2	34,9	5,5	17,5	17,1	17,7	11,7	10,0	7,7	7,9	17,8	36,3

Histogram

== Staff ==
The staff members are typically former miners who have been converted to electricians. Although the same company still employs them, their jobs are quite different and more varied. Their work involves laying lines, installing transformers, and making repairs. Some also supply coal and dump ash on nearby slag heaps. The plant's staff also includes machinists, technicians, mechanics, and firemen from the coal industry.

== Remnants ==
At the beginning of the 21st century, only a few remnants of these installations remained. These included the ruins of the Lure and Frahier stations, the large Belfort station that had been converted into housing, and some old metal pylons. A few vestiges of the power station remain, including a small circular wall (a remnant of the water tower), converted buildings, and the site of the tallest building, which has remained uncultivated. Additionally, the name "rue de la Centrale" remains in use.

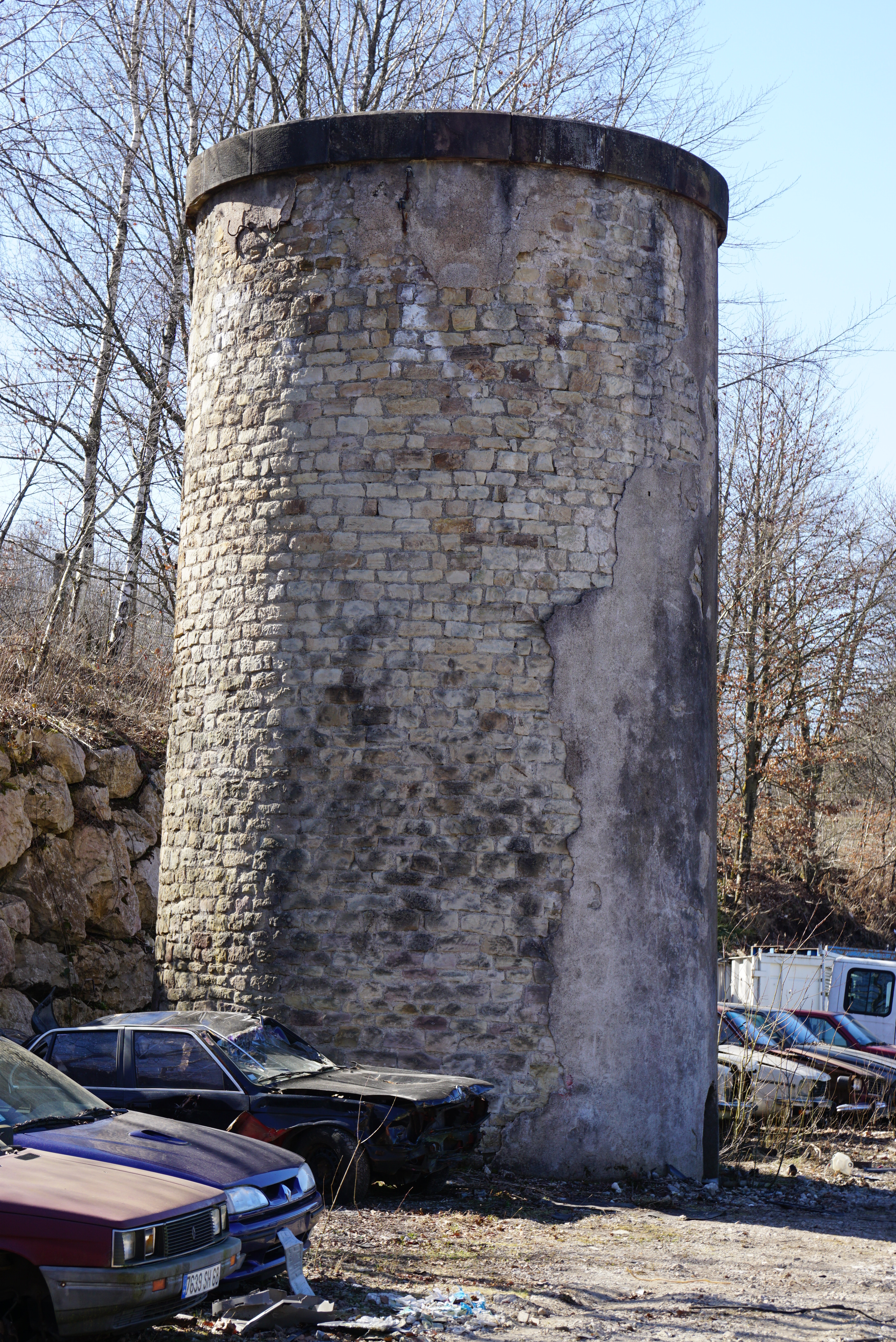
Ruins of the water tower.

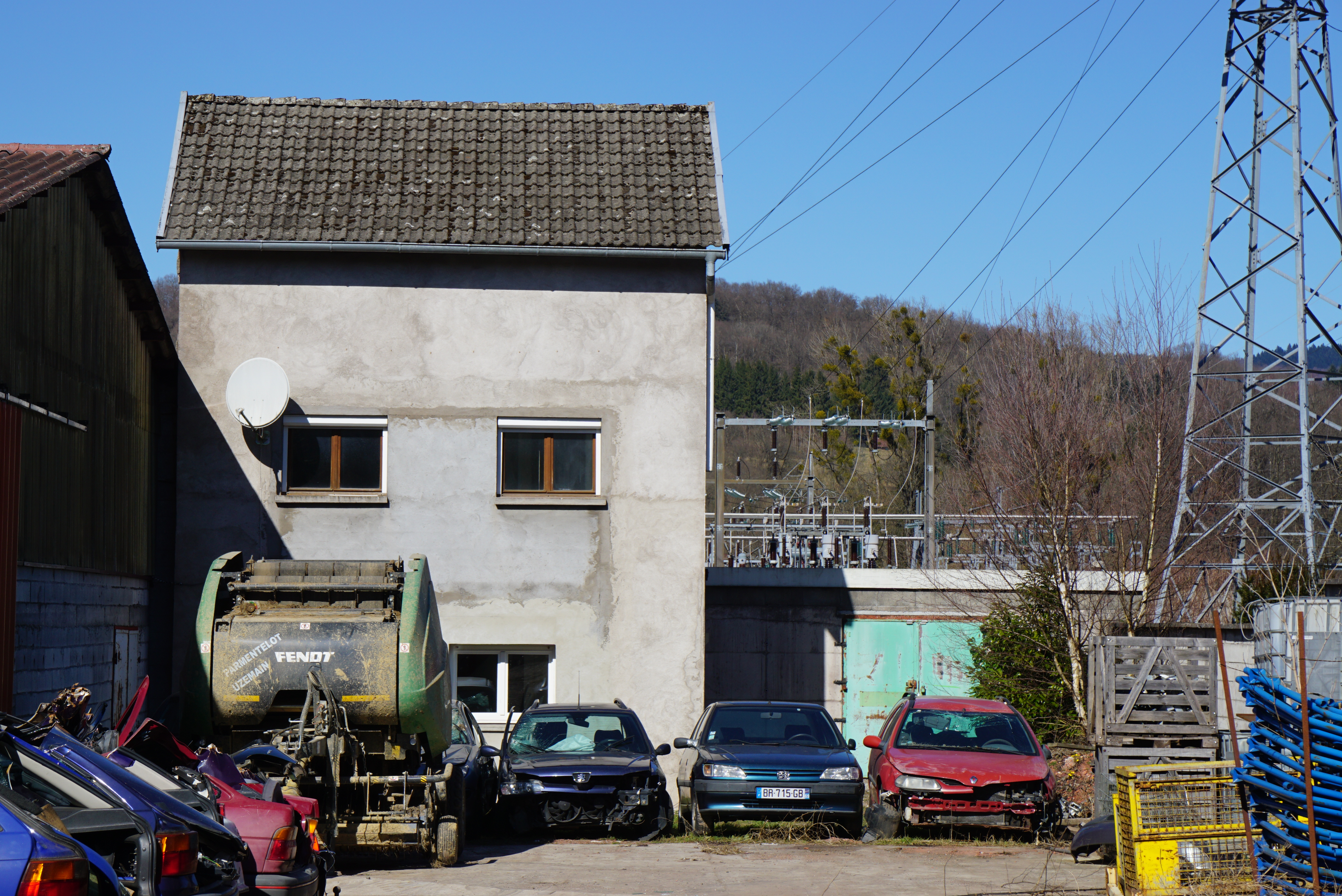
A former annex building.

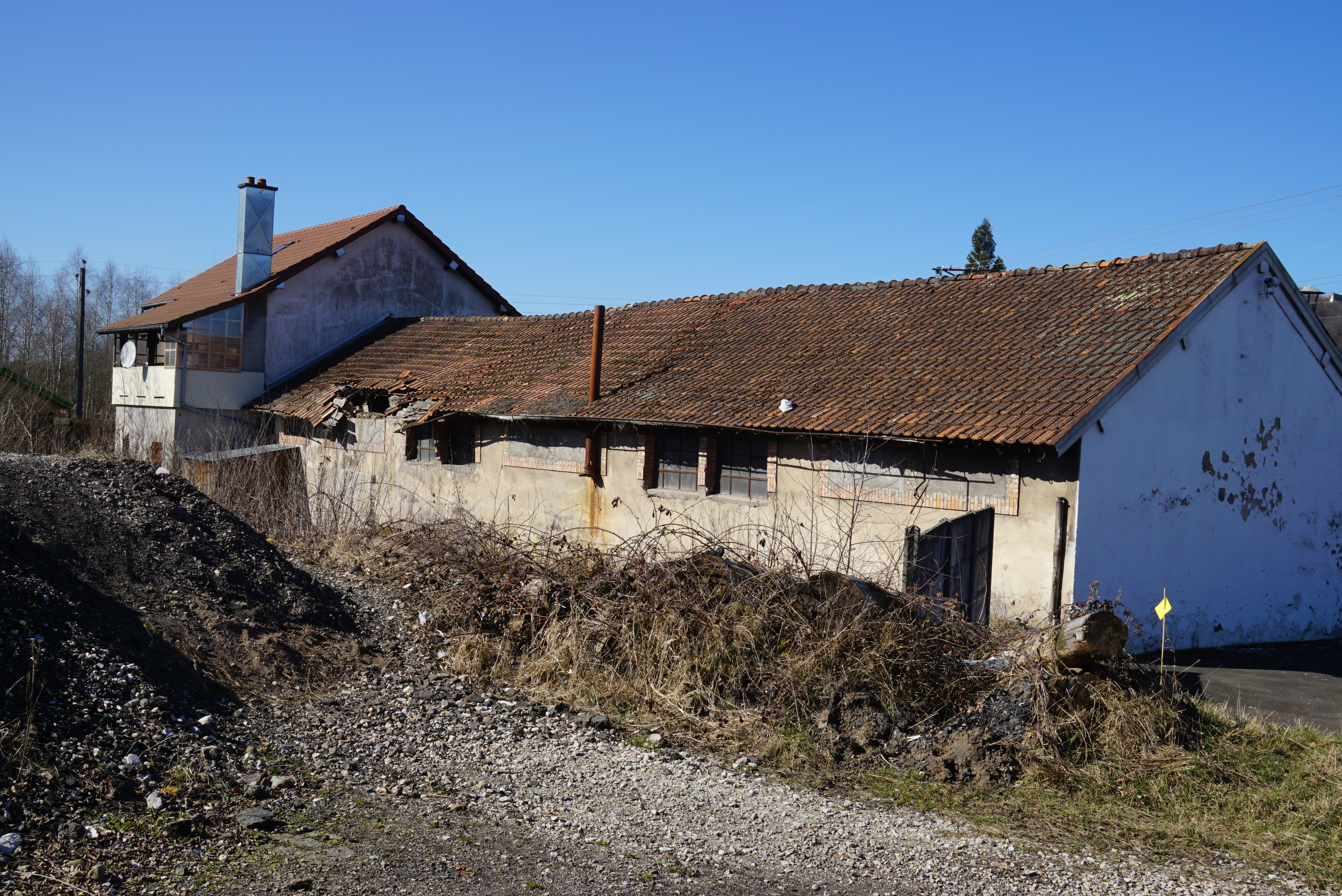
A building between the Chanois coal mine and the power plant.

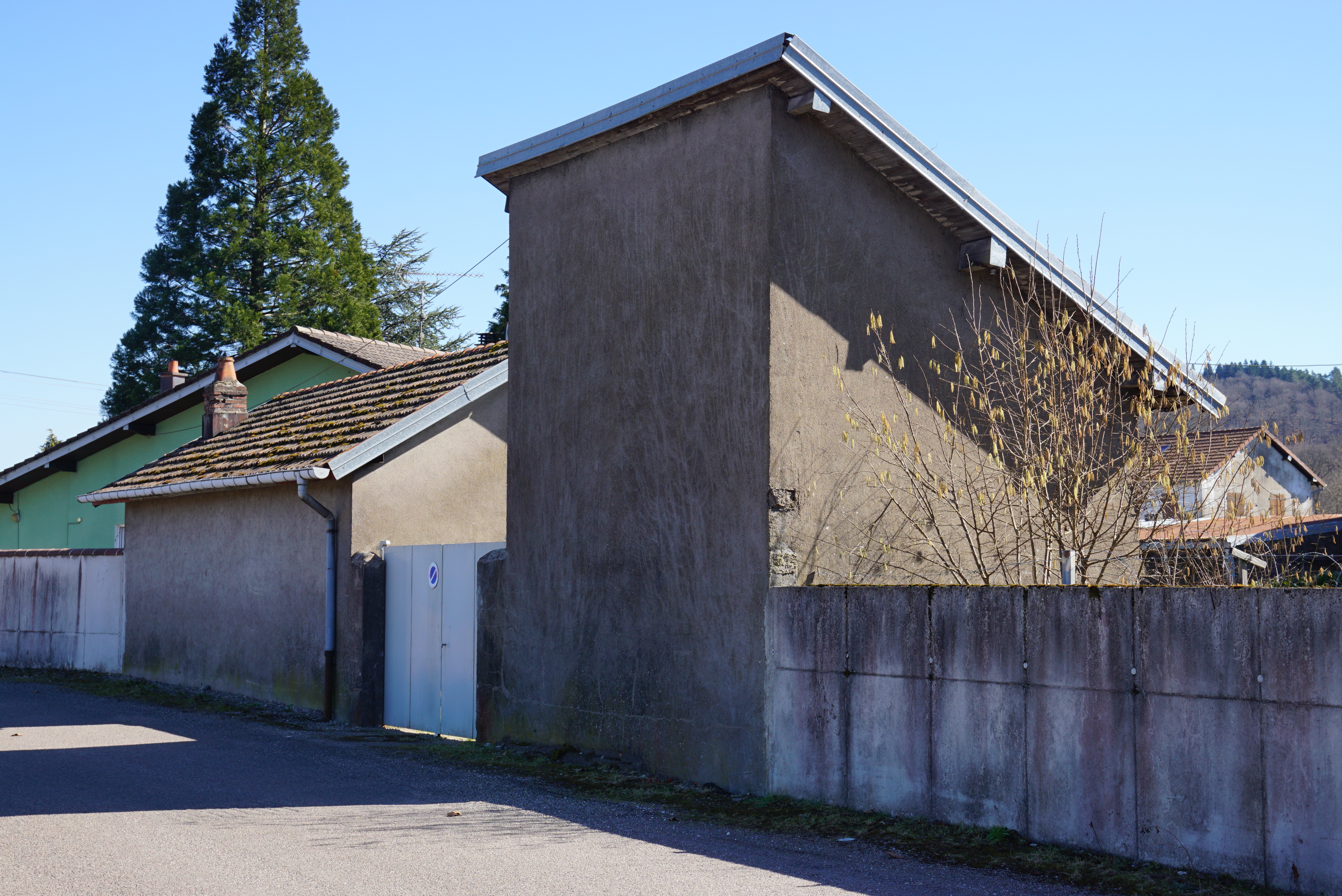
Old annex buildings.

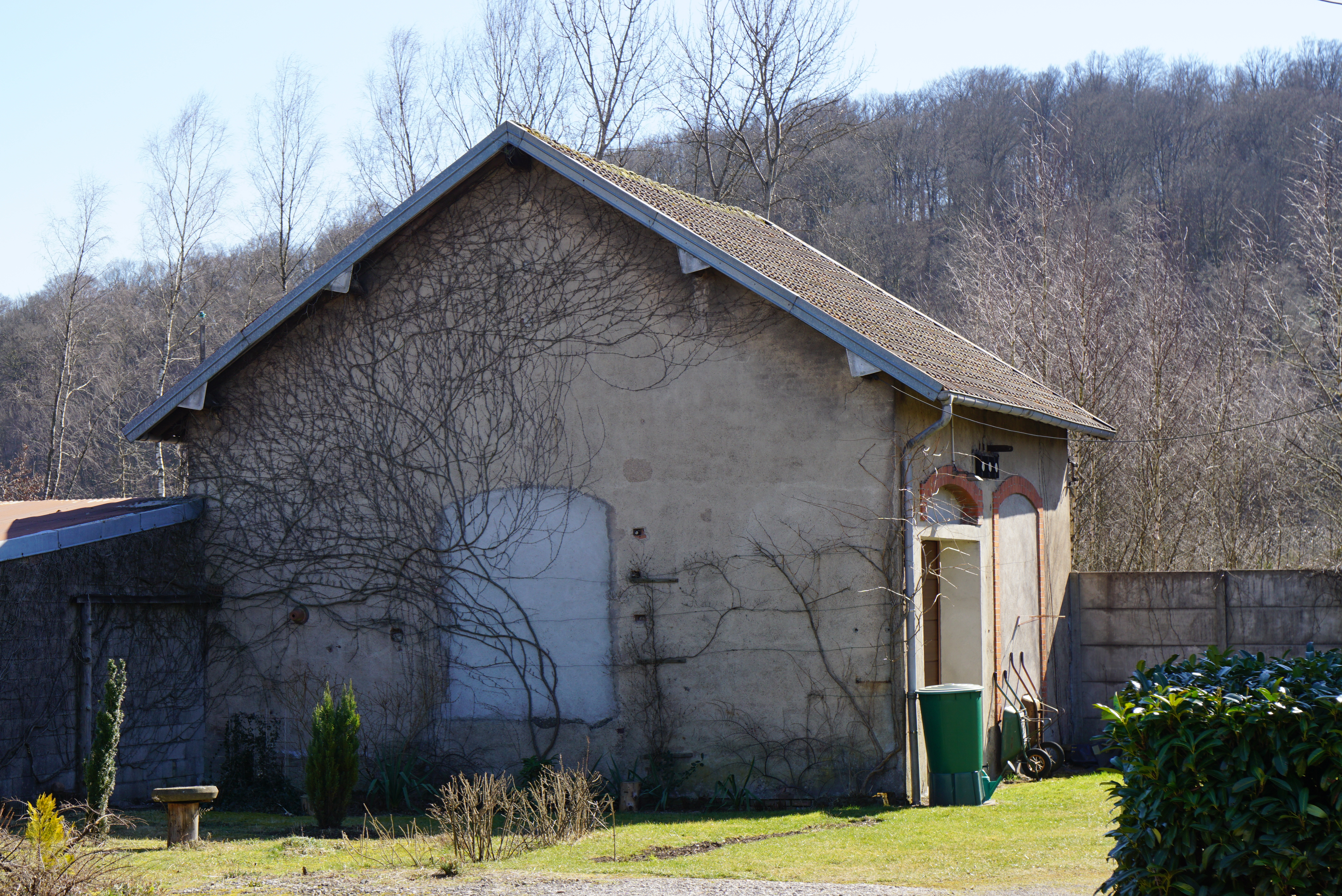
It's an old outbuilding.

== Bibliography ==
- Parietti, Jean-Jacques (2001). Les Houillères de Ronchamp vol. I : La mine (in French). Éditions Comtoises. ISBN 2-914425-08-2.
- Parietti, Jean-Jacques (2010). Les Houillères de Ronchamp - Tome 2 : Les mineurs (in French). Fc culture & patrimoine. ISBN 978-2362300011.
- PNRBV (1999). Le charbon de Ronchamp (in French). Déchiffrer le patrimoine - Parc naturel régional des Ballons des Vosges. ISBN 2-910328-31-7.
- Comité de défense de la mine et de la centrale thermique de Ronchamp (1954). Livre jaune pour le maintien en activité de l'exploitation minière et de la centrale thermique de Ronchamp (PDF) (in French). Comité de défense de la mine et de la centrale thermique de Ronchamp.
- Clerget, Yves (2012). Vestiges miniers, architecture industrielle, art contemporain (PDF) (in French). Service éducatif du Muséum Cuvier de Montbéliard. Archived from the original (PDF) on 2013-10-29.
- Velocita (2017). Parc éolien du Dôme Haut-Saônois : dossier de concertation (PDF) (in French). Velocita-Groupe Envision Energy.

== Related articles ==
- Thermal power station
- Ronchamp coal mines
