= ElecLink =

Electrical interconnector between the UK and France

- Map of ElecLink

Location
- Country: United Kingdom, France
- Coordinates: 51°05′54″N 1°08′41″E; 50°55′13″N 1°46′50″E
- General direction: North–South
- From: Folkestone, United Kingdom
- Passes through: English Channel
- To: Peuplingues, France

Ownership information
- Owner: Getlink

Construction information
- Cable manufacturer: Prysmian
- Substation manufacturer: Siemens
- Contractors: Balfour Beatty
- Construction started: 2017
- Construction cost: £490 million
- Commissioned: 25 May 2022

Technical information
- Type: submarine cable
- Current type: HVDC
- Total length: 51 km (32 mi)
- Capacity: 1,000 MW
- DC voltage: ±320 kV
- No. of poles: 2
- No. of circuits: 1
- Website: www.eleclink.co.uk

ElecLink is a 1,000 MW high-voltage direct current (HVDC) electrical interconnector between the United Kingdom and France, passing through the Channel Tunnel. ElecLink commenced operations on 25 May 2022.

== Route ==
The 51-kilometre (32-mile) DC cable runs via the Channel Tunnel between HVDC converter stations at Peuplingues in France and Folkestone in the UK, with an additional 14.5 km (9.0 mi) of underground AC cable on the English side to Sellindge substation, and 3.5 km (2.2 mi) on the French side to Les Mandarins substation, to link the converter stations to the existing transmission networks.

== Ownership ==
It is owned by a subsidiary of Getlink, which owns the tunnel itself.

ElecLink is the first UK interconnector to be entirely funded by private finance, without being underwritten by electricity consumers.

== Construction ==
The two converter stations were constructed by Siemens and the Siemens FIT (Field Installation Team). The HVDC cables and the cable between the Folkstone converter station and the National Grid substation at Sellindge were constructed by Prysmian and installed by Balfour Beatty, while RTE constructed the cable between the Peuplingues converter station and the Les Mandarins substation.

A specialized, 51-metre-long (167 ft), work train was manufactured by Clayton Equipment for the project to allow the HVDC cable to be installed in 2021 and tested. The train contained drilling modules, monorail modules, jointing platforms and hauling equipment, as well as staff accommodations and was entirely battery-powered.

In the entire length of the tunnel, a hexagonal monorail track was installed, as well as two, 7-metre-high (23 ft) high, 4-track helices (one on each end), that was straddled by a cable carrier which could carry sections of 2.5 km (1.6 mi) of HVDC cable into the tunnel. The actual cable pull happened between February and summer 2021, with cable sections then spliced in cleanrooms inside the tunnel. The monorail was later removed.

== Project history ==
Work commenced on the project in 2017.

The foundation stone of the Folkestone converter station was laid in February 2017, by Jesse Norman MP, Minister for Industry and Energy.

In 2019, the Anglo-French Channel Tunnel Intergovernmental Commission (IGC), which oversees the safety of the Channel Tunnel, suspended part of the project's consent due to concerns about safety of the HVDC cables within the tunnels. This decision prevented the cables from being installed. The IGC was expected to make a final decision on whether the cables can be installed in April 2020, based on a recommendation from the Channel Tunnel Safety Authority, however this approval was again delayed due to further safety concerns and the COVID-19 pandemic.

In December 2020, the IGC announced its approval of the project, with the cable expected to be installed by summer 2021 and commercial operation expected to start in mid-2022.

In February 2022, the IGC and national safety authorities announced their approval of ElecLink, which allowed final testing of the interconnector to commence, with entry into service still planned for mid-2022.

ElecLink commenced operations on 25 May 2022.

== See also ==
- List of high-voltage transmission links in the United Kingdom
