= Sellindge =

Village in Kent, England

Coordinates: 51.1073°N 0.990°E

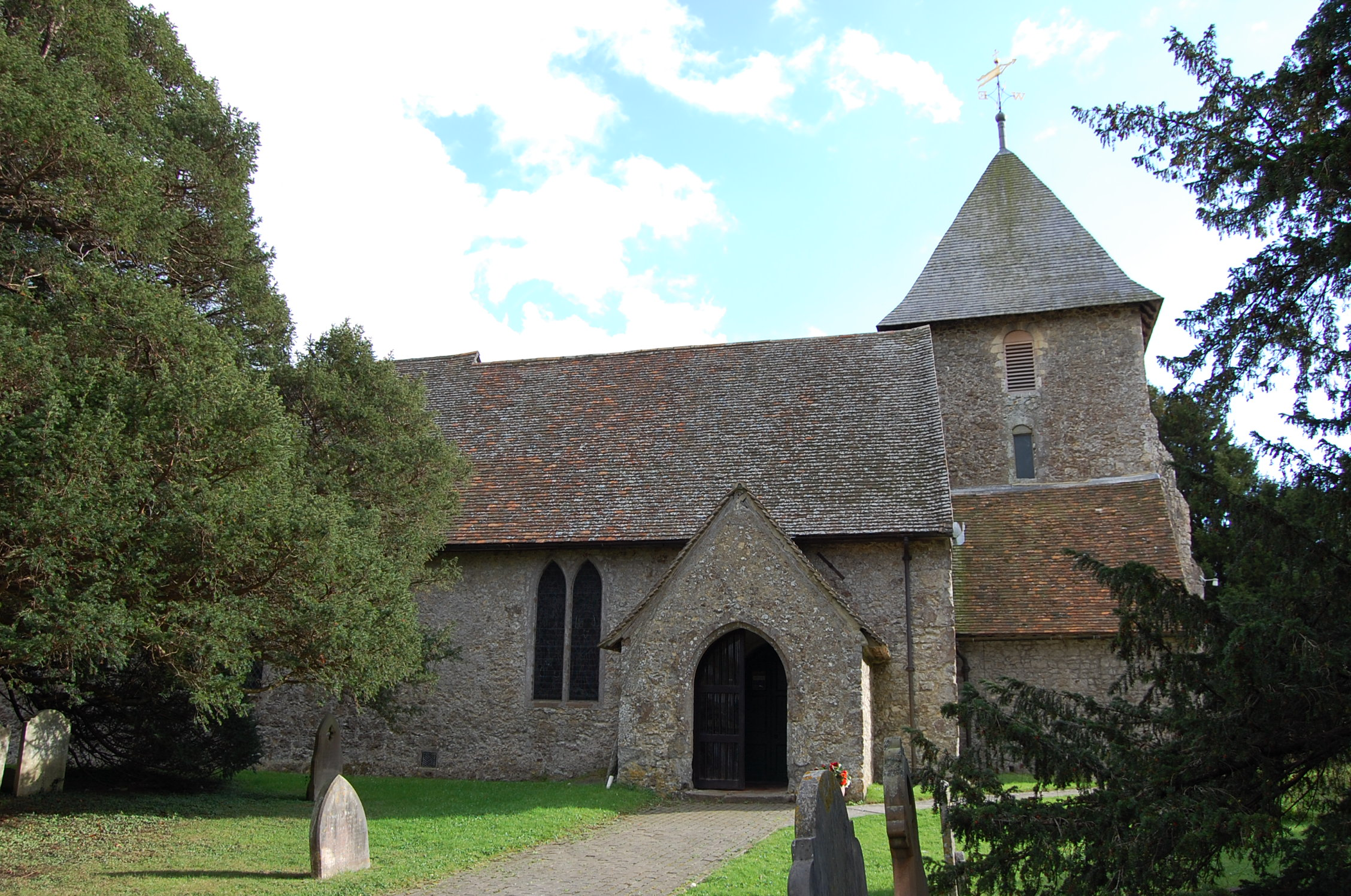
- St Mary the Virgin Church

- Location within Kent
- Population: 1,356 (parish, 2001 Census)
- OS grid reference: TR100382
- Civil parish: Sellindge
- District: Folkestone and Hythe
- Shire county: Kent
- Region: South East
- Country: England
- Sovereign state: United Kingdom
- Post town: ASHFORD
- Postcode district: TN25
- Dialling code: 01303
- Police: Kent
- Fire: Kent
- Ambulance: South East Coast

Sellindge is a civil parish and village on the A20 road between Ashford and Folkestone in Kent, South East England. Sellindge is part of North Downs West Ward of Folkestone and Hythe District Council but part of the Elham ward of Kent County Council.

Since 1971 til 2014 the yearly Sellindge Steam rally was held on Hope farm by Les Birch. Folkestone & Ashford Military Show has been held on the same site since 2019. In 2008 and 2009 the Sellindge Music Festival was held in the village.

The static inverter plant of HVDC Cross-Channel lies south of the motorway on Church Lane. Plans exist for a 3,000 capacity lorry park and an anaerobic digestion plant. A new town called Otterpool is planned nearby.

== Sport & Leisure ==
The village has a sports and social club and a village hall. Sellindge has to its northern side the Kent North Downs. The village has one public house, The Duke's Head, and a small shopping area. There is also a church.

== In popular culture ==
Author Russell Hoban repurposes Sellindge as "Sel Out" in his 1980, post apocalyptic novel Riddley Walker.

== Notable people ==
- Caroline Langrishe, actress
- Edmund Berry Godfrey, magistrate, (born 1621)
