= Réseau de Transport d'Électricité =

Electricity transmission system operator of France

- Company type: Société anonyme
- Industry: Public utility
- Founded: July 2000
- Headquarters: Paris, France
- Services: electricity transmission
- Revenue: €4,126 million (2007)
- Number of employees: 8279 (2007)
- Parent: Électricité de France
- Website: www.rte-france.com

Previous logo

Réseau de Transport d'Électricité (French pronunciation: [ʁezo də tʁɑ̃spɔʁ delɛktʁisite], "Electricity Transmission Network"), usually known as RTE, is the electricity transmission system operator of France. It is responsible for the operation, maintenance and development of the French high-voltage transmission system, which at approximately 100,000 kilometres (62,000 mi), is Europe's largest.

RTE is a société anonyme headquartered in Paris and mostly owned by the French state through Électricité de France and Caisse des dépôts et consignations.

== Corporation ==
=== History ===
RTE was formed as a result of European Directive No. 96/92/EC of December 1996, which directed that at least 26% of member countries' electricity sales be open to competition, and became law in France in February 2000. The directive required France to liberalise its electricity market by unbundling its generation and transmission activities, which until then had been fully controlled by EdF. RTE was established in July 2000 as a division of EdF, with a public charter to guarantee equitable access to its electricity market, and to secure the continuity and quality of electricity supply.

Further legal acts in July 2004 and August 2005 enforced the legal separation of RTE from EdF, transforming it into a limited liability subsidiary, and granted it trademark rights to its logo and the name Réseau de Transport d'Électricité.

=== Regulation ===
RTE's activities are overseen by the Government regulatory body Commission de régulation de l'énergie (Commission for Energy Regulation) (CRE). CRE's duties in this regard include ensuring RTE facilitates access to its network, and to survey and regulate the electricity market while opening it up to competition.

=== Commercial operations ===
RTE declared a turnover of €4,126 million in 2007, and yielding a profit of €466 million, both up slightly from the previous year, which RTE attributed to increases in network access payments and revenue derived from interconnector capacity auctions. The workforce in the same year was 8,279.

=== Data portal ===
RTE operate an open data portal named Open Data RTE which serves French electricity system data for public reuse.

== Transmission network ==
RTE's transmission system operates at voltages of 63 kV, 90 kV, 150 kV, 225 kV and 400 kV. RTE deems the 63 to 150 kV circuits to be "high voltage" and the 225 kV and 400 kV "extra high voltage". As of the end of 2006, there were 99,676 km (61,940 mi) of transmission lines interconnecting 2,490 substations. Most of the transmission network is carried on 77,544 route-kilometres (48,180 mi) of overhead power lines; only 3,258 km (2,020 mi) of the network consists of underground cable. In common with the rest of Europe, the supply frequency is a nominal 50 Hz.

=== Demand and trade ===
France's peak demand occurs during the winter, and in 2007 was 88,960 MW. The annual production of electricity was 544.7 TWh, generated from an installed capacity of 108,319 MW, almost 60% of which was nuclear.

RTE's network interconnects with those of its counterparts in most of France's neighbouring countries, and the international trade (both import and export) of electricity is a major contribution to RTE's business activities. France is the largest exporter of electricity in Europe, and the country is linked via a total of 44 high voltage interconnections to Spain, Italy, Switzerland, Germany, Belgium and the United Kingdom, the last of which by means of an HVDC submarine power cable. France's balance of trade in this market is normally positive; in 2007, exports of electrical energy totalled 83.0 TWh and imports 27.5 TWh. The largest trading partner was Switzerland, which imported 26.1 TWh of French electricity and exported 4.4 TWh back.
