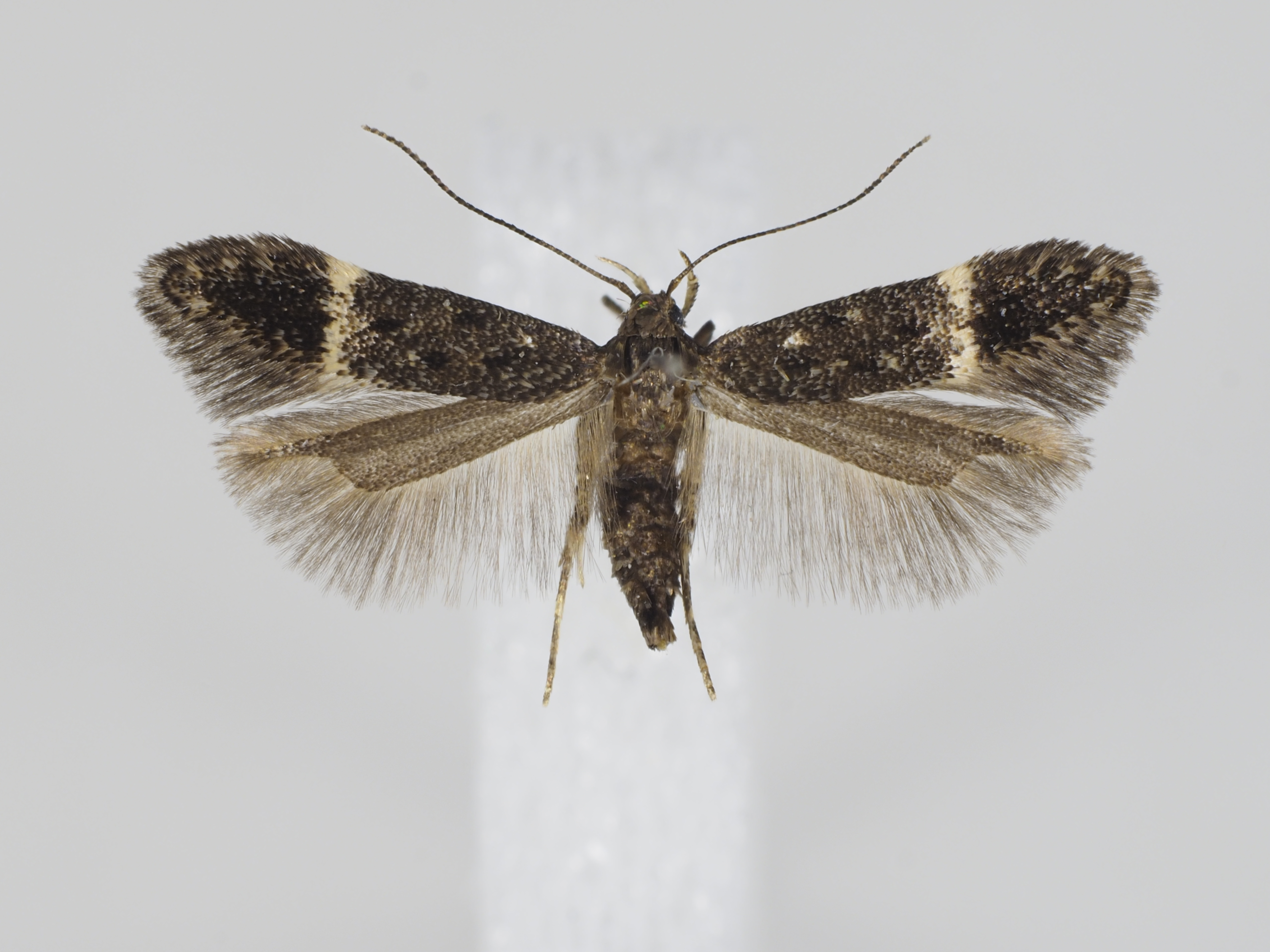

Scientific classification
- Kingdom: Animalia
- Phylum: Arthropoda
- Class: Insecta
- Order: Lepidoptera
- Family: Gelechiidae
- Genus: Monochroa
- Species: M. sepicolella

Binomial name
- Monochroa sepicolella (Herrich-Schäffer, 1854)

Synonyms
- Anacampsis sepicolella Herrich-Schäffer, 1854; Monochroa (Xystophora) agasta Gozmany, 1954; Xystophora rectifasciella Fuchs, 1902; Anacampsis balcanica Rebel, 1903

= Monochroa sepicolella =

Species of moth

Monochroa sepicolella is a moth of the family Gelechiidae. It is found from central and northern Europe to the Ural Mountains, the Caucasus and southern Siberia.

The wingspan is 10–12 mm. Adults are on wing from June to August.

The larvae feed on Fallopia dumetorum and Rumex thyrsiflorus. They mine the leaves of their host plant.
