= Saint-Forgeot =

- Commune
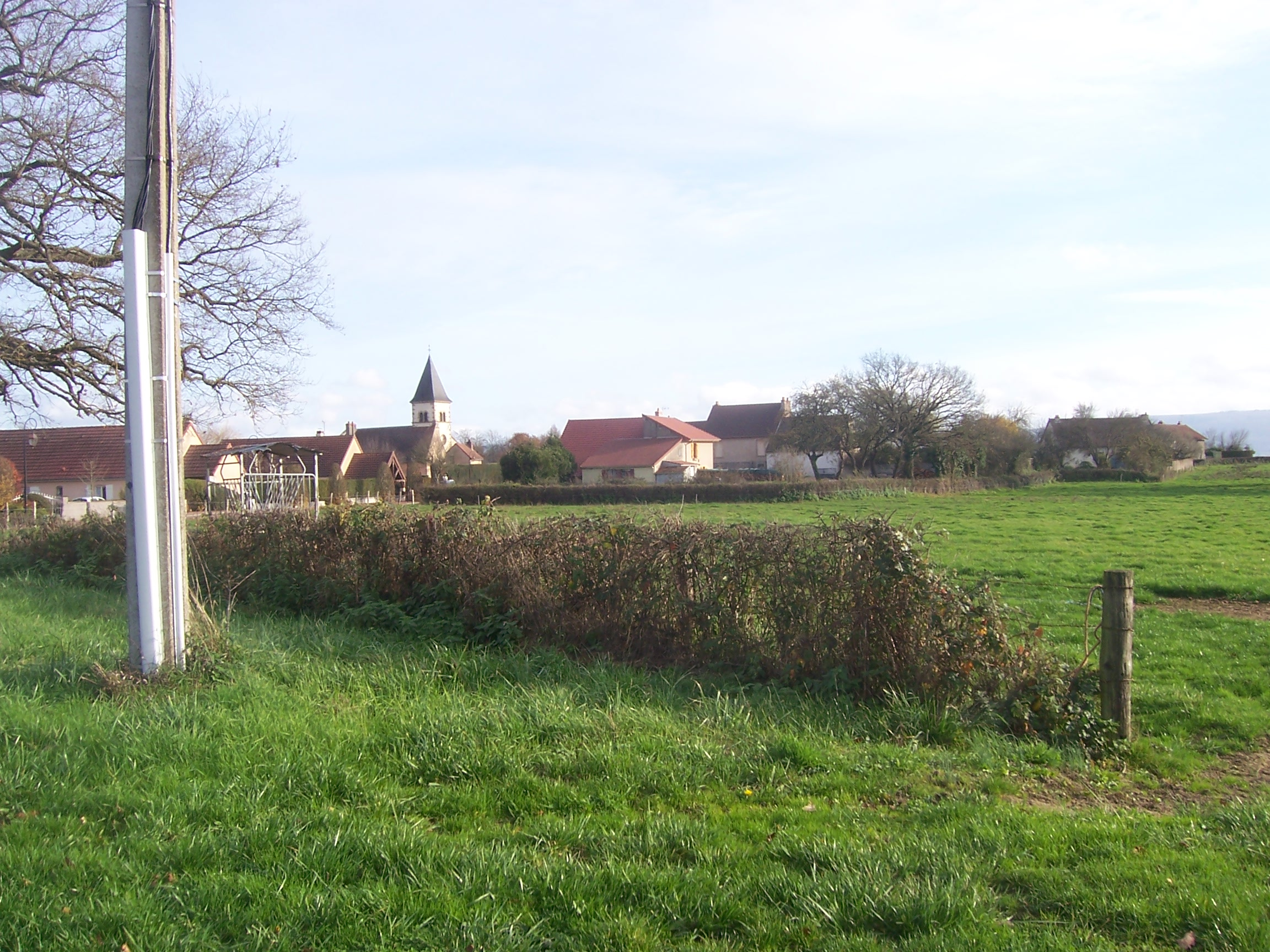
- A general view of Saint-Forgeot
- Location of Saint-Forgeot
- Location within France Location within Bourgogne-Franche-Comté
- Coordinates: 47°00′15″N 4°18′02″E
- Country: France
- Region: Bourgogne-Franche-Comté
- Department: Saône-et-Loire
- Arrondissement: Autun
- Canton: Autun-1

Government
  - Mayor (2020–2026): Norbert Labille
- Area^{1}: 15.96 km^{2} (6.16 sq mi)
- Elevation: 306 m (1,004 ft)
- Highest elevation: 395 m (1,296 ft)
- Lowest elevation: 288 m (945 ft)
- Population (2023): 435
  - Density: 27.3/km^{2} (70.6/sq mi)
- Time zone: UTC+01:00 (CET)
  - Summer (DST): UTC+02:00 (CEST)
- INSEE/Postal code: 71414 /71400
- ^{1} French Land Register data, which excludes lakes, ponds, glaciers > 1 km^{2} (0.386 sq mi or 247 acres) and river estuaries.

Saint-Forgeot (French pronunciation: [sɛ̃ fɔʁʒo]) is a commune in the Saône-et-Loire department in the region of Bourgogne-Franche-Comté in eastern France. It is located north of Autun.

== See also ==
- Communes of the Saône-et-Loire department
- Les Télots Mine
