= Dracy-Saint-Loup =

- Commune
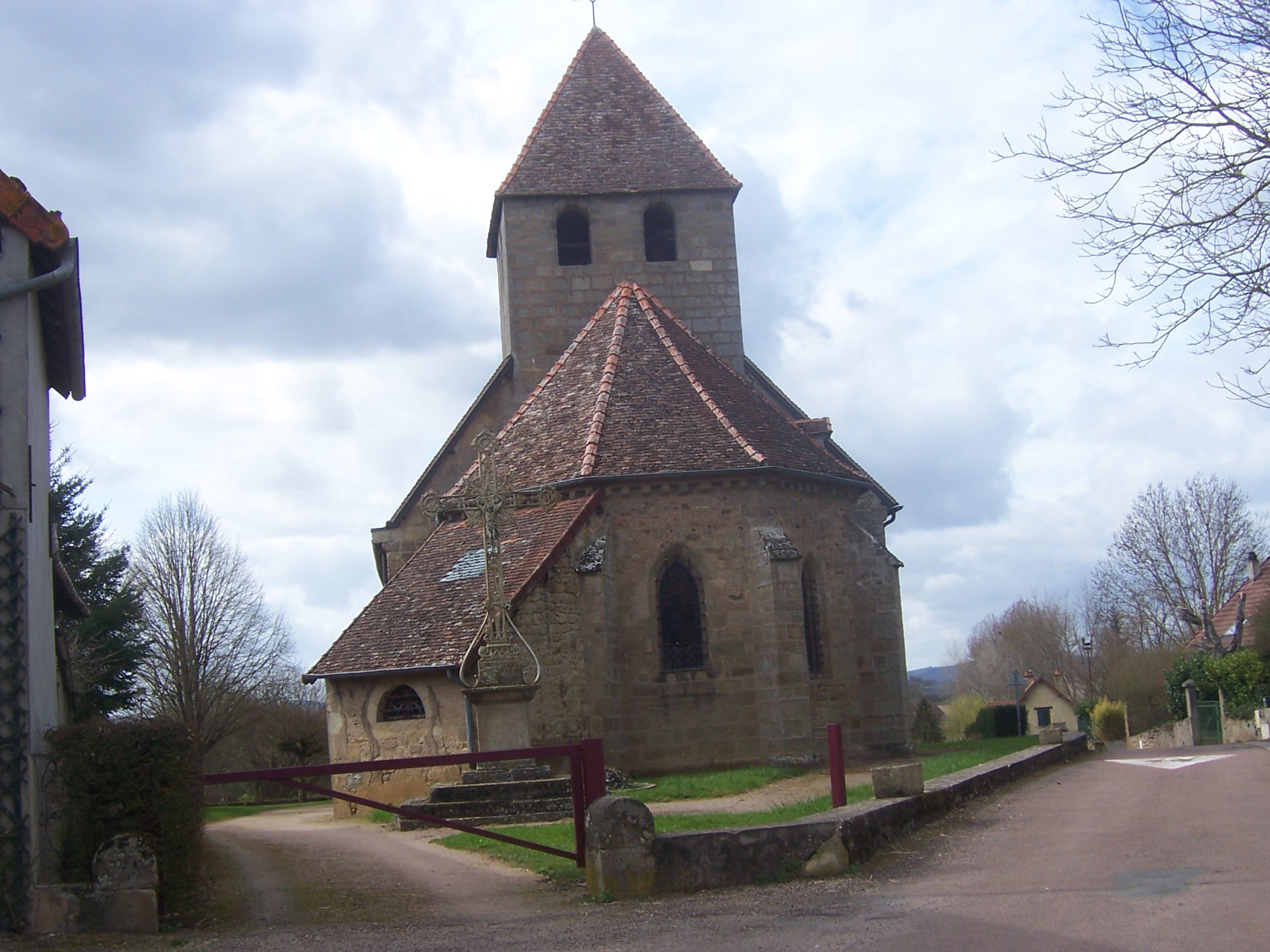
- The church in Dracy-Saint-Loup
- Location of Dracy-Saint-Loup
- Location within France Location within Bourgogne-Franche-Comté
- Coordinates: 47°00′57″N 4°20′12″E
- Country: France
- Region: Bourgogne-Franche-Comté
- Department: Saône-et-Loire
- Arrondissement: Autun
- Canton: Autun-1
- Area^{1}: 21.2 km^{2} (8.2 sq mi)
- Elevation: 303 m (994 ft)
- Highest elevation: 371 m (1,217 ft)
- Lowest elevation: 289 m (948 ft)
- Population (2023): 641
  - Density: 30.2/km^{2} (78.3/sq mi)
- Time zone: UTC+01:00 (CET)
  - Summer (DST): UTC+02:00 (CEST)
- INSEE/Postal code: 71184 /71400
- ^{1} French Land Register data, which excludes lakes, ponds, glaciers > 1 km^{2} (0.386 sq mi or 247 acres) and river estuaries.

Dracy-Saint-Loup is a commune in the Saône-et-Loire department in the region of Bourgogne-Franche-Comté in eastern France.

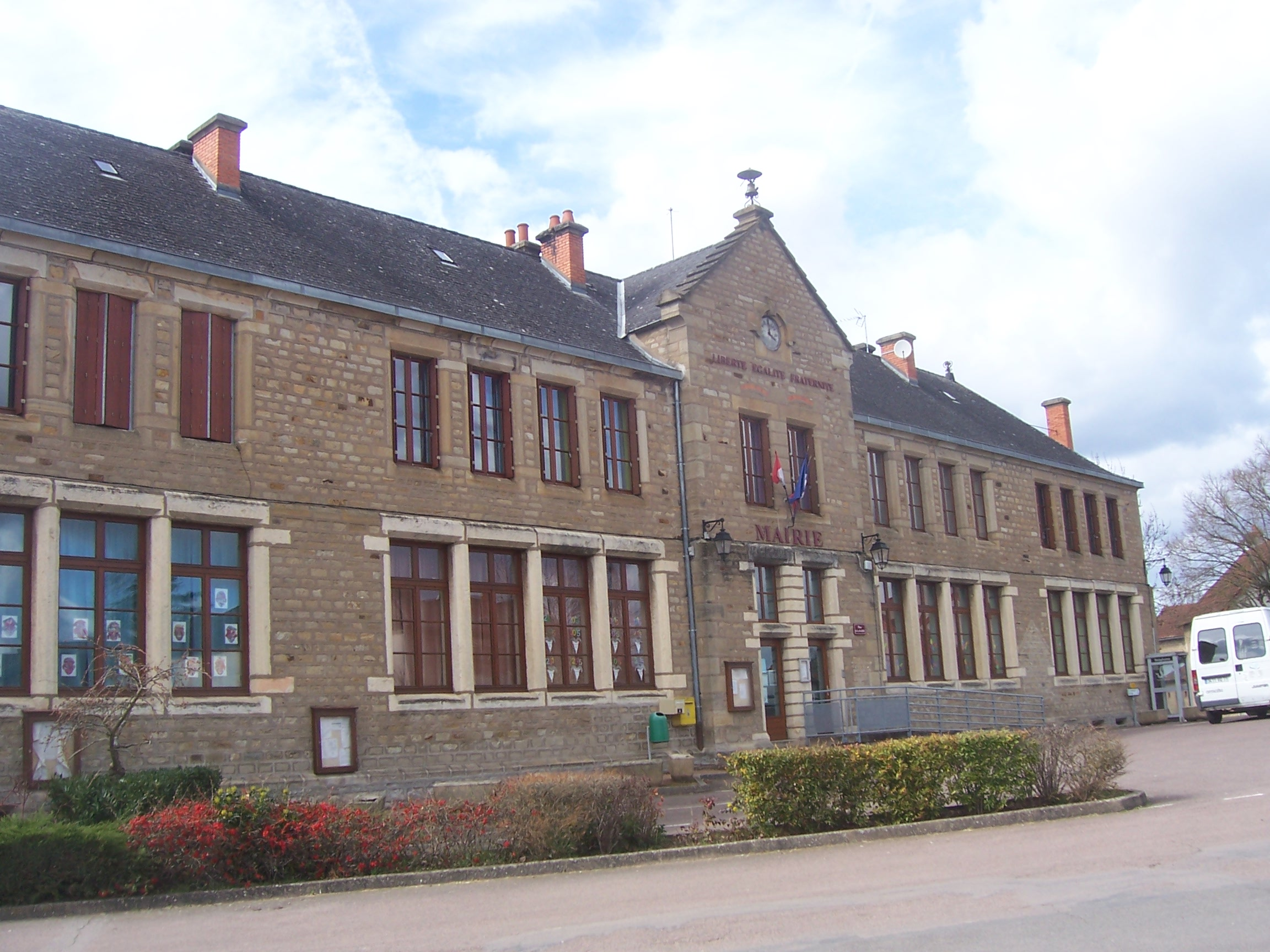
Town hall

== See also ==
- Communes of the Saône-et-Loire department
