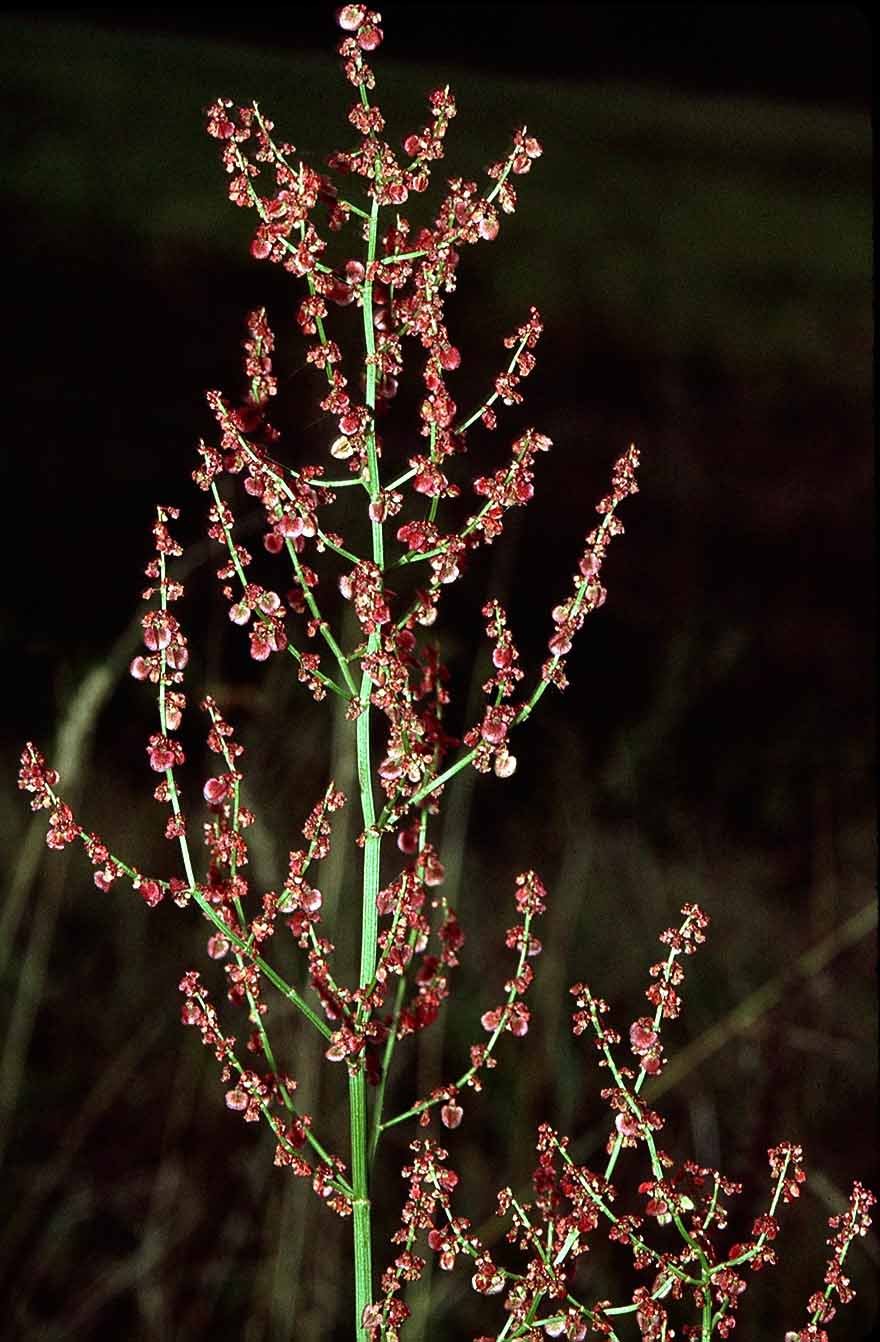

Scientific classification
- Kingdom: Plantae
- Clade: Tracheophytes
- Clade: Angiosperms
- Clade: Eudicots
- Order: Caryophyllales
- Family: Polygonaceae
- Genus: Rumex
- Species: R. thyrsiflorus

Binomial name
- Rumex thyrsiflorus Fingerh.

= Rumex thyrsiflorus =

Species of herb

Rumex thyrsiflorus, also known commonly as the compact dock or thyrse sorrel, is a perennial herb, which grows in meadows and wasteland in most parts of Europe. It is somewhat similar to common sorrel (Rumex acetosa).
