= Hytort process =

- Process type: chemical
- Industrial sector(s): Chemical industry, oil industry
- Feedstock: oil shale
- Product(s): shale oil
- Developer(s): Institute of Gas Technology

The Hytort process is an above-ground shale oil extraction process developed by the Institute of Gas Technology. It is classified as a reactive fluid process, which produces shale oil by hydrogenation.

The Hytort process has advantages when processing oil shales containing less hydrogen, such as the eastern United States Devonian oil shales. In this process, oil shale is processed at controlled heating rates in a high-pressure hydrogen environment, which allows a carbon conversion rate of around 80%. Hydrogen reacts with coke precursors (a chemical structure in the oil shale that is prone to form char during retorting but has not yet done so). In the case of Eastern US Devonian shales, the reaction roughly doubles the yield of oil, depending on the characteristics of the oil shale and process.

In 1980, the HYCRUDE Corporation was established to commercialize the Hytort technology. The feasibility study was conducted by HYCRUDE Corporation, Phillips Petroleum Company, Bechtel Group and the Institute of Gas Technology.

== See also ==
- Galoter process
- Alberta Taciuk Process
- Petrosix process
- Kiviter process
- TOSCO II process
- Fushun process
- Paraho process
- Lurgi-Ruhrgas process
- Chevron STB process
- LLNL HRS process
- KENTORT II
