= LLNL HRS process =

Shale oil extraction process

LLNL HRS
- Process type: chemical
- Industrial sector(s): Chemical industry, oil industry
- Feedstock: oil shale
- Product(s): shale oil
- Developer(s): Lawrence Livermore National Laboratory

LLNL HRS (hot recycled solid) process is an above-ground shale oil extraction technology. It is classified as a hot recycled solids technology.

== History ==
The process was developed by the Lawrence Livermore National Laboratory. In 1984–1987, Lawrence Livermore National Laboratory operated a LLNL HRS process-based pilot pant at Parachute, Colorado, with capacity of one tonne of oil shale per day. In 1989, the pilot plant was upgraded to process four tonnes of oil shale per day. The pilot plant was operated till 1993. Later the process was modified and tested in the field of waste treatment and environmental cleanup for removing organic compounds and for decomposing sodium nitrate in contaminated soils.

== Process ==
As a heat carrier, LLNL HRS process uses spent oil shale. Raw oil shale and spent oil shale are mixed in the fluidized bed mixer. The use of fluidized bed mixer results in better mixture, which in turn increases the mean quantity of oil yield and oil shale throughput. From the fluidized bed mixer oil shale moves downward to the packed-bed pyrolyzer. The heat is transferred from the heated spent oil shale to the raw oil shale causing pyrolysis. As a result, oil shale decomposes to shale oil vapors, oil shale gas and spent oil shale. Oil vapors are collected from the pyrolyzer. The spent oil shale, still including residual carbon (char), by the air pneumatic lift pipe to the delayed-fall combustor where it is combusted to heat the process. The delayed-fall combustor used in this process gives greater control over the combustion process as compared to a lift pipe combustor. From the delayed-fall combustor the oil shale ash and spent shale falls into a fluidized bed classifier where the finest parts of solids are removed and hot spent shale is forwarded to the fluidized bed mixer.

== See also ==
- Galoter process
- Alberta Taciuk Process
- Petrosix process
- Kiviter process
- TOSCO II process
- Fushun process
- Paraho process
- Lurgi-Ruhrgas process
- Chevron STB process
- KENTORT II
