= Nevada–Texas–Utah retort =

Shale oil extraction technology

NTU Retort
- Process type: chemical
- Industrial sector(s): chemical industry oil industry
- Feedstock: Oil shale
- Product(s): Shale oil
- Inventor: Roy C. Dundas; Raymond T. Howes
- Year of invention: 1923
- Developer(s): NTU Company

The Nevada–Texas–Utah retort process (also known as NTU, Dundas–Howes or Rexco process) was an above-ground shale oil extraction technology to produce shale oil, a type of synthetic crude oil. It heated oil shale in a sealed vessel (retort) causing its decomposition into shale oil, oil shale gas and spent residue. The process was developed in the 1920s and used for shale oil production in the United States and in Australia. The process was simple to operate; however, it was ceased from the operation because of a small capacity and labor extensiveness.

== History ==
The NTU retort was a successor of the 19th-century coal gasification retorts and it is considered as a predecessor of the gas combustion retort and the Paraho processes. It was invented and patented by Roy C. Dundas and Raymond T. Howes in 1923. The process was improved by David Davis and George Wightman Wallace, a consulting engineer of the NTU Company. In 1925, the NTU Company built a test plant at Sherman Cut near Casmalia, California.

In 1925–1929, the process was tested by the United States Bureau of Mines in the Oil Shale Experiment Station at Anvil Point in Rifle, Colorado. Retorting was carried out from 17 January to 28 June 1927. The plant was dismantled when work was terminated in June 1929. One of the leading technologist involved in this stage was Lewis Cass Karrick, an inventor of the Karrick process. In 1946–1951, two pilot plants with nominal capacities of 40 tons of raw oil shale were located at the same location. More than 12,000 barrels of shale oil was produced during this period. During the World War II, three NTU retorts were operated at Marangaroo, New South Wales, Australia. Almost 500,000 barrels of shale oil was produced by these retorts by retorting local torbanite.

== Retort ==
The NTU retort was a vertical downdraft retort, which used internal combustion to generate heat for an oil shale pyrolysis (chemical decomposition). The retort was designed as a steel cylinder, lined with fire bricks. At the top it was equipped with an air supply pipe and at the bottom it was equipped with an exhaust pipe. The batch of crushed oil shale was loaded from the top; after that the retort was sealed. To start the pyrolysis process the fuel gas was ignited at the top of retort, and air injection into the retort started. The supply of fuel gas stopped after the upper quarter of the oil shale batch started to burn. At the same time the air injection continued bringing temperature in the burning part to about 1,500 °F (820 °C).

The heated gas caused a pyrolysis on the lower part of oil shale and produced shale oil and oil-shale gas are escaped from the retort through exhaust pipe at the bottom of retort. The pyrolysis occurred at the temperature about 800 °F (430 °C). By time-being, the combustion zones moved downward, and the char (semi-coke) produced as a solid residue of pyrolysis, ignited to burn as additional fuel for combustion. This caused the pyrolysis zone to move downward to the lower parts of retort. After combustion zone reached to the bottom of retort, air injection was stopped to stop combustion. After burning of char, the shale oil production ceased and only spent oil shale ash remained in the retort. The bottom of retort could opened for removal of the oil shale ash after retorting process. Operating the NTU retort with nominal capacity of 40 ton of raw oil shale, the full process cycle took about 40 hours. The shale oil yield varied from 80% to 85% of Fischer assay.

== Advantages and disadvantages ==
The advantage of the NTU retort process was simple design, simple operation, and limited need for external fuel. It was suitable for processing of wide variety of oil shales. The disadvantage of this process was a batch mode of operation not allowing continuous retorting, and therefore having small capacity being labor extensive at the same time. The process also had a relatively low oil yield and it required cooling water.

== See also ==
- Alberta Taciuk process
- Petrosix
- Kiviter process
- Galoter process
- TOSCO II process
- Fushun process
- Superior multimineral process
- Pumpherston retort
