= KENTORT II =

- Process type: chemical
- Industrial sector(s): Chemical industry, oil industry
- Feedstock: oil shale
- Product(s): shale oil
- Developer(s): Center for Applied Energy Research, University of Kentucky

KENTORT II is an above-ground shale oil extraction process developed by the Center for Applied Energy Research of the University of Kentucky. It is a hot recycled solids fluidized bed retorting process developed since 1982 for processing the eastern United States Devonian oil shales. The concept of this process was initiated in 1986 in the test unit.

The KENTORT II retort consists of four fluidized bed vessels, configured in cascade. The raw oil shale is fed to the pyrolysis vessel the pyrolysis section, where it is fluidized by a mixture of steam and product oil shale gas from the gasification section below. Heat is transferred to the raw oil shale by a combination of fluidizing gas and recirculating hot spent shale from the gasification section. The pyrolysis takes place at 500 °C (930 °F) to 550 °C (1,020 °F).

The pyrolyzed oil shale moves by gravity downward to the gasification section. Gasification, which takes place at 750 °C (1,380 °F) to 850 °C (1,560 °F), converts remained carbon in the spent shale (char) to product oil shale gas. Steam from the cooling zone is used for fluidizing the sent shale while heat transferred by hot solids (oil shale ash) from the combustion section. The spent shale moves to the combustion section where it is burnt to heat the process, while oil shale ash moves to the cooling section before its removal from the retort.

== See also ==
- Galoter process
- Alberta Taciuk Process
- Petrosix process
- Kiviter process
- TOSCO II process
- Fushun process
- Paraho process
- Lurgi-Ruhrgas process
- Chevron STB process
- LLNL HRS process
