= Chevron STB process =

Chevron STB
- Process type: chemical
- Industrial sector(s): Chemical industry, oil industry
- Feedstock: oil shale
- Product(s): shale oil
- Leading companies: Chevron Corporation
- Inventor: Paul W. Tamm, Gordon E. Langlois
- Year of invention: 1978
- Developer(s): Chevron Research Company

The Chevron STB process (also known as Staged Turbulent Bed Retorting Process) is an above-ground shale oil extraction technology. It is classified as a hot recycled solids technology.

The Chevron STB process is a hot recycled solids technology, which processes small particles of oil shale. It was invented by Paul W. Tamm and Gordon E. Langlois in the Chevron Research Company laboratory in Richmond, California. As a heat carrier, it uses oil shale ash, produced by combustion of spent oil shale in the separate combustor.

In this process, crushed oil shale is fed into the top of the retort where it is mixed with the hot oil shale ash. The oil shale moves downward through the retort as fluidized bed of particles. While descending, the heat is transferred from the oil shale ash to the raw oil shale causing pyrolysis. As a result, oil shale decomposes to shale oil vapors, oil shale gas and spent oil shale. A stripping gas is inserted from the bottom of retort, which carries oil vapors into solids separation section. The fine particles are directed to the combustor while oil vapors are moved to the condenser. In condenser, shale oil is separated from water vapor and product gases. On the bottom of retort the spent shale is transported to the combustor.

== See also ==
- Galoter process
- Alberta Taciuk Process
- Petrosix process
- Kiviter process
- TOSCO II process
- Fushun process
- Paraho process
- Lurgi-Ruhrgas process
- KENTORT II
