= Shell Spher process =

- Process type: chemical
- Industrial sector(s): Chemical industry, oil industry
- Feedstock: oil shale
- Product(s): shale oil
- Developer(s): Shell Oil

The Shell Spher process (Shell Pellet Heat Exchange Retorting) is an above ground fluidization bed retorting technology for shale oil extraction. It is classified as a hot recycled solids technology.

Raw oil shale is crushed to a fine particles. Heat is transferred to oil shale by heat-carrying ceramic balls of size 6 to 8 millimetres (0.24 to 0.31 in). Raw oil shale is preheated in fluidized bed at the temperature of 600 °F (320 °C) in the case if oxygen is used as fluidizing medium, or at 650 °F (340 °C) if non-oxidizing gases are used. Heated ceramic balls fall then through the bed in counter-current direction. The preheated oil shale is further heated in the retorting vessel. The retorted spent shale is cooled in a fast-fluidized bed by the recirculated cool pellets from the preheater; while cooling the spent shale ceramic balls are heated by the spent shale.

== See also ==
- Alberta Taciuk Process
- Kiviter process
- Petrosix process
- Galoter process
- Fushun process
- Paraho process
- Lurgi-Ruhrgas process
- TOSCO II process
