= Oil shale in China =

Overview of the industry in China

Oil shale in China is an important source of unconventional oil. A total Chinese oil shale resource amounts of 720 billion tonnes, located in 80 deposits of 47 oil shale basins. This is equal to 48 billion tonnes of shale oil. At the same time there are speculations that the actual resource may even exceed the oil shale resource of the United States.

The oil shale industry was established in China already in the 1920s. After decrease in the production, the industry started to increase and as of 2008; several companies are engage in the shale oil production or the oil shale-based power generation. After 2005, China became the largest shale oil producer in the world. In 2011, the country produced about 650,000 tonnes of shale oil. Most of production facilities are Fushun-type retorts.

At the end of 2006, the Fushun Shale Oil Plant was the largest oil shale plant in the world. In 2005, the China National Oil Shale Association was established in Fushun. The main oil shale research institution in China is the China University of Petroleum.

== Reserves ==
From 2004 to 2006 China undertook the national oil shale evaluation. According to the evaluation, it has been estimated that a total Chinese oil shale resource amounts of 720 billion tonnes, located in 80 deposits of 47 oil shale basins. This is equal to 48 billion tonnes of shale oil. The proven oil shale reserves comprise about 36 billion tonnes.

Oil shale resources in China
Province	In-place oil shale resources (billion tonnes)	Oil yield (Fischer Assay)
Fushun, Liaoning	3.6	6.5%
Maoming, Guangdong	4.1	7%
Huadian, Jilin	0.3	10%
Longkou, Shandong	0.1	14%
Nong'an, Jilin	16	4.5%

The principle Chinese reserves with commercial importance lie in Fushun (Liaoning), Maoming (Guangdong), Huadian and Nong'an (Jilin), and Longkou (Shandong). The Longkou deposit has the highest oil content (about 14%).

The Fushun oil-shale and coal deposit of Eocene age is located in north-eastern China, south of Fushun, Liaoning. Coal and oil shale are in a small outlier of Mesozoic and Tertiary sedimentary and volcanic rocks underlain by Precambrian granitic gneiss. The thickness of the layer of oil shale varies from 48 metres (157 ft) to 190 metres (620 ft) with the average of 80 metres (260 ft). The lacustrine origin oil shale is presented in the Jijuntun Formation, overlying the Guchengzi Formation consisting coal and underlying of green mudstone of the Xilutian Formation.

The Tertiary age Maoming oil-shale deposit is 50 kilometres (31 mi) long, 10 kilometres (6.2 mi) wide, and 20 metres (66 ft) to 25 metres (82 ft) thick. The ore is yellow brown and the bulk density is about 1.85. The oil shale contains 72.1% ash, 10.8% moisture, 1.2% sulfur, with a heating value of 1,745 kcal/kg (dry basis). It is not suitable for above-ground retorting, but it could be used for a power generation by a fluidized bed combustion.

Professor Alan R. Carroll of University of Wisconsin–Madison estimates that Upper Permian lacustrine oil shale deposits of the Junggar-Turpan-Hami basins in northwest China, absent from previous global oil shale assessments, are comparable to the Green River Formation.

== History ==
The extraction of oil shale in China began in 1926 under the Japanese rule. The commercial-scale production of shale oil began in 1930 in Fushun, Manchuria, with the construction of the "Refinery No. 1" operating Fushun-type retorts. After World War II, the shale oil production was ceased, but 100 Fushun-type oil shale retorts and the related shale oil processing units were restored in 1949 after the founding of the People's Republic of China. In 1950, total 266 retorts were in operation, each with the capacity of 100–200 tonnes shale oil per day.

In 1954, the "Refinery No. 2" began its production and in 1959, the maximum annual shale oil production increased to 780,000 tonnes. The produced shale oil was acid and alkaline washed and hydrotreated for producing light liquid fuels. In 1961, China was producing one third of its total oil production from oil shale. In Maoming, Guangdong Province, a new oil shale retorting plant with 64 retorts was put into operation in 1963.

Since 1965, oil shale usage in Fushun started to decline. With the discovery of Daqing oilfield in the 1960s, the shale oil production declined and Sinopec, an operator of shale oil production these times, shut down its oil shale operations in the beginning of the 1990s. At the same time, the Fushun Oil Shale Retorting Plant was established as a part of the Fushun Mining Group. It started production in 1992. In 2005, China became the largest shale oil producer in the world. At the same year, China National Oil Shale Association was established in Fushun.

== Industry ==
The major oil shale industry in China is the Fushun Mining Group. Several other coal and oil companies have expanded their activities into oil shale extraction. As of 2011, there were seven shale retorting plants with a total production of 650,000 tonnes of shale oil. These plants located in Fushun, Huadian, Wangqing, Beipiao, Longkou, Yaojie, and Dongning. Most of them use Fushun retorts or modified Fushun retorts.

=== Fushun Mining Group ===
Fushun Mining Group owns geological reserve for high grade oil shale about 3.6 billion tonnes, of which exploitable reserve is 920 million tonnes, divided between East Open Pit (760 million tonnes) and West Open Pit (160 million tonnes). The oil shale production uses reserves from the West Open Pit, while the East Open Pit oil shale reserves are not mined yet. Oil shale is produced as a byproduct of the coal mining. In 2006, Fushun Mining Group produced 240,000 tonnes of shale oil, and was expected to produce 300,000 tonnes in 2007.

The company operates the largest oil shale retorting plant in the world. In 2011, it had two oil shale retorting plants with 120 and 100 retorts, producing annually about 350,000 tonnes of shale oil. In addition, the company has constructed the Alberta Taciuk processor to treat small size oil shale (particulate oil shale) which can't be processed in Fushun retort. The 250 tonnes per hour ATP processor was engineered and provided by Canadian company UMATAC Industrial Processes, a subsidiary of UMA Engineering Ltd. The processor is in the cold testing phase.

The cost of shale oil production in Fushun is US$18.46 per barrel (1,500 yuan per tonne), of which the mining costs 0.184, transportation 4.25, and retorting 13.84. Fushun shale oil is sold as fuel oil, while part of the surplus retort gas with low heating value is used in an internal combustion engine for producing steam and power. Spent shale and shale ash is used for the cement production; the annual production of cement is 300,000 tonnes and the annual production of bricks is 240 million.

=== PetroChina ===
In 2006, PetroChina, the largest Chinese oil company, set up a department of New Sources of Energy, which is responsible for the oil shale development. In August 2008, its subsidiary Daqing Oil Company started to build a shale oil plant in Mudanjiang, Heilongjiang. The plant is designed to process 1.2 million tonnes of oil shale per year and produce 100,000 tonnes of shale oil. It will use solid heat carrier technology.

=== Maoming ===
Maoming oil shale industry was developed from the 1960s to the 1990s by Maoming Petrochemical Company, a subsidiary of Sinopec, which built 64 Fushun-type retorts and 48 gas combustion retorts for producing shale oil. The production peaked with 180,000 tonnes of shale oil per annum. This industry was shut down in the 1990s. The Guandong Province authorities have a plan to use the Maoming oil shale for the power production using fluidized bed combustion. In 2008, one circulating fluidized-bed boiler was constructed. Guangdong Electricity Company has plans to build a power station with capacity of 1,200 MW.

=== Longkou Mining Group ===
Longkou Mining Group, subsidiary of Shandong Energy, produces oil shale as a coal mining byproduct. It operates shale oil plant which is equipped with 40 Fushun retorts. The shale oil production is about 120,000 tonnes per year and the planned full capacity is 200,000 tonnes of shale oil per year. The company also plans to utilize Enefit-280 technology. In addition, the company plans to burn shale char mixed with particulate oil shale in fluidized bed combustion for power generation, and the shale ash would be utilized for production of building material.

=== Jilin Energy & Communication Corporation ===
In 1996, Jilin Energy & Communication Corporation, a subsidiary of the China Power Investment Corporation, put into operation the first oil-shale-fired power plant in China, consisting of three circulating fluidized-bed units with capacity of 12 megawatts (MW). In 2005, the company in cooperation with the Jilin Municipal Government put forward the Huadian oil shale comprehensive utilization project. The project includes construction of the shale oil plant with capacity of 200,000 tonnes of shale oil per year, two circulated fluidized bed combustion units with capacity of 50 MW each and production of 1.2 million tonnes of cement and other building materials utilizing spent shale and shale ash. The shale oil plant will utilize the Petrosix technology.

=== Royal Dutch Shell ===
Shell China has established a joint venture with the Jilin Guangzheng Mineral Development Company Limited to explore and develop oil shale resources in Jilin Province. 61% of shares of the joint venture, Jilin Shell Oil Shale Development Company Limited (Jilin Shell), belongs to Shell China, while 39% is owned by Jilin Guangzheng. The company is planning to use the Shell's in-situ conversion process.

=== Wangqing County Longteng Energy Development Co. ===
Privately owned Wangqing County Longteng Energy Development Co. operates a shale oil plant in Wangqing, Jilin. The plant is equipped with 40 Fushun-type retorts, and it produces about 50,000 tonnes of shale oil per year. In 2009, the company also commissioned an oil shale power plant which is equipped with two circulating fluidized bed. The plant has capacity of 6 MW of electricity.

=== Other industries ===
In Beipiao, Liaoning, the Beipiao Coal Mining Company operates 60 Fushun-type retort with plans to open additional 24 retorts in 2012. Yaojie Coal Electricity Group in cooperating with Sanjiang Coal Chemical Company opened shale oil plant in July 2010 in Lanzhou, Gansu. The plant consist of eight square-shaped gas combustion retorts. Longhua Harbin Coal Chemical Industry Company, a subsidiary of China National Coal Corporation, is preparing to build a shale oil plant with the capacity of 1,000 tonnes of shale oil per day in Yilan, Heilongjiang. The plant will use hot recycled solids technology combined with fluidized bed retort. Similar plant is planned by the Songyasan Coal Mining Company.

The Mingxin Mining Company is planning to co-produce coal and oil shale in Mingxin, Gansu Province. The planned shale oil plant would have a capacity of 400,000 tonnes of shale oil per year. In addition, five private companies produce about 30,000 tonnes of shale oil by utilizing the Fushun-type retorts in Jilin. Liaoning Chengda is operating 12 modified Fushun retorts in Huadian, Jilin, and is building 24modified Fushun retorts in Jimsar County, Xinjiang. Other potential industries could be start in Uromqi (Xinjiang), Yongden (Gansu), and Chanpo (Hainan).

== Research ==
The main oil shale research institution in China is the China University of Petroleum. Its Applied Chemistry Department is the main institution dealing with oil shale. The university's oil shale experts undertake oil shale evaluation, consulting, and reviewing work for pre-feasibility and feasibility studies and development projects for domestic and foreign countries. e.g. Mongolia.
