= Shale Technologies (company) =

Shale Technologies, LLC is an American privately held oil shale company with headquarters in Rifle, Colorado. It is an owner of the proprietary information relating to the Paraho oil shale retorting technologies (Paraho Direct and Paraho Indirect). The Paraho Direct is an American version of a vertical shaft retort similar to the Kiviter and Fushun retorts. This technology is used in the company's pilot plant facility in Rifle.

== History ==
On 28 June 2000, Shale Technologies purchased Paraho Development Corporation, a developer of shale oil extraction technology.
