= Chattanooga Corporation =

American oil technology developer

Chattanooga Corporation is an American developer of technology for unconventional oil, particularly for tar sands and shale oil extraction.

== Operations ==
Chattanooga Corporation operates two pilot plants in Alberta, Canada, commissioned in 2000 and 2004. It has tested its technology for extraction on Colorado and Kentucky oil shales.

== Chattanooga Process ==
Chattanooga Process is an extraction process that uses a fluidized bed reactor and an associated hydrogen-fired heater. In this process, retorting occurs at relatively low temperatures (1,000 °F or 540 °C) through thermal cracking and hydrogenation of the shale into hydrocarbon vapors and spent solids. The thermal cracking allows hydrocarbon vapors to be extracted and scrubbed of solids. The vapors are then cooled, inducing the condensate to drop out of the gas. The remaining hydrogen, light hydrocarbons, and acid gases are passed through an amine scrubbing system to remove hydrogen sulfide which is converted to elemental sulfur. The cleaned hydrogen and light hydrocarbon gases are then fed back into the system for compression or into the hydrogen heater to provide heat for the fluidized bed reactor. This system is a nearly-closed loop; almost all of its energy needs are provided by the source material. The demonstration plant in Alberta was able to produce 930 barrels (~130 t) of oil per kilotonne of oil shale with an API gravity ranging between 28 and 30. With hydrotreating (the reaction of oil with high pressure hydrogen), it would be possible to improve this to 38-40 °API. Chattanooga Corporation is considering a design that would implemented in a 2,500-barrel-per-hour (~330 t/h) facility.

Integrating Chattanooga Process with the steam assisted gravity drainage in the process of extraction of tar sands and extra heavy oil may increase the quality of produced bitumen and increased energy sufficiency.
