= Shell in situ conversion process =

Shell ICP
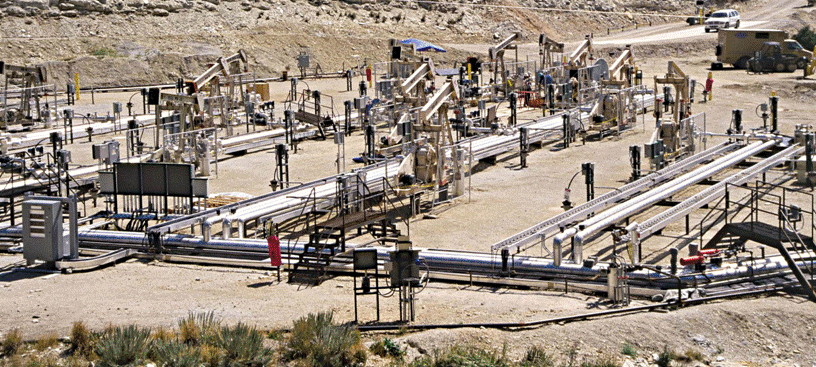
- Shell's experimental in-situ oil shale facility, Piceance Basin, Colorado.
- Process type: chemical
- Industrial sector(s): chemical industry, oil industry
- Feedstock: oil shale
- Product(s): shale oil
- Leading companies: Shell Oil Company
- Main facilities: Mahogany Research Project
- Developer(s): Shell Oil Company

The Shell in situ conversion process (Shell ICP) is an in situ shale oil extraction technology to convert kerogen in oil shale to shale oil. It is developed by the Shell Oil Company.

== History ==
Shell's in situ conversion process has been under development since the early 1980s. In 1997, the first small scale test was conducted on the 30-by-40-foot (9.1 by 12.2 m) Mahogany property test site, located 200 miles (320 km) west of Denver on Colorado's Western Slope in the Piceance Creek Basin. Since 2000, additional research and development activities have carried on as a part of the Mahogany Research Project. The oil shale heating at Mahogany started early 2004. From this test site, Shell has recovered 1,700 barrels (270 m^{3}) of shale oil.

== Process ==
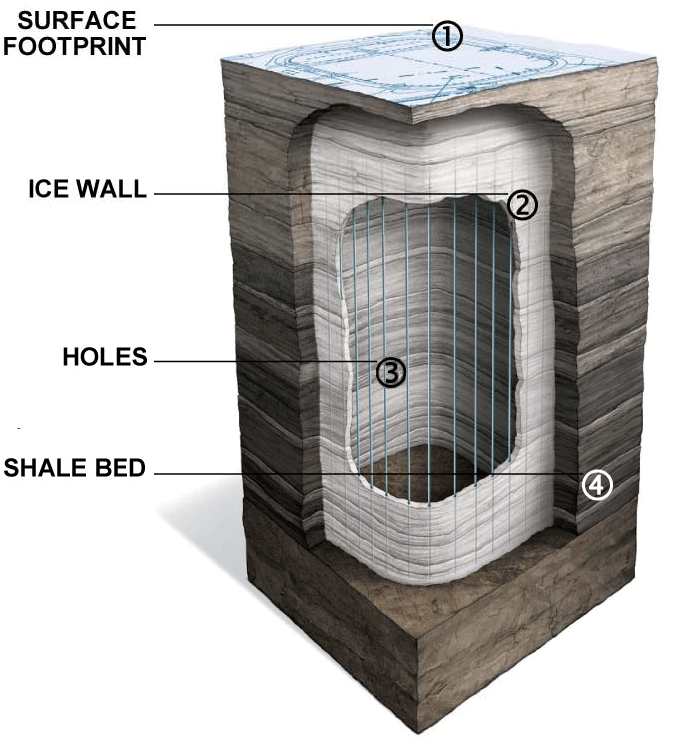
Shells Freeze Wall for in situ shale oil production

The process heats sections of the vast oil shale field in situ, releasing the shale oil and oil shale gas from the rock so that it can be pumped to the surface and made into fuel. In this process, a freeze wall is first to be constructed to isolate the processing area from surrounding groundwater. To maximize the functionality of the freeze walls, adjacent working zones will be developed in succession. 2,000 feet (610 m) wells, eight feet apart, are drilled and filled with a circulating super-chilled liquid to cool the ground to −60 °F (−50 °C). Water is then removed from the working zone. Heating and recovery wells are drilled at 40 feet (12 m) intervals within the working zone. Electrical heating elements are lowered into the heating wells and used to heat oil shale to between 650 °F (340 °C) and 700 °F (370 °C) over a period of approximately four years. Kerogen in oil shale is slowly converted into shale oil and gases, which then flow to the surface through recovery wells.

== Energy consumption ==
A RAND study in 2005 estimated that production of 100,000 barrels per day (16,000 m^{3}/d) of oil (5.4 million tons/year) would theoretically require a dedicated power generating capacity of 1.2 gigawatts (10 billion kWh/year), assuming deposit richness of 25 US gallons (95 L; 21 imp gal) per ton, with 100% pyrolysis efficiency, and 100% extraction of pyrolysis products. If this amount of electricity were to be generated by a coal-fired power plant, it would consume five million ton of coal annually (about 2.2 million toe).

In 2006, Shell estimated that over the project life cycle, for every unit of energy consumed, three to four units would be produced. Such an "energy returned on energy invested" would be significantly better than that achieved in the Mahogany trials. For the 1996 trial, Shell applied 440,000 kWh (which would require about 96 toe energy input in a coal-fired plant), to generate 250 barrels (40 m^{3}) of oil (37 toe output).

== Environmental impacts ==
Shell's underground conversion process requires significant development on the surface. The separation between drilled wells is less than five meters and wells must be connected by electrical wiring and by piping to storage and processing facilities. Shell estimates that the footprint of extraction operations would be similar to that for conventional oil and gas drilling. However, the dimensions of Shell's 2005 trial indicate that a much larger footprint is required. Production of 50,000 bbl/day would require that land be developed at a rate on the order of 1 square kilometre (0.39 sq mi) per year.

Significant water consumption and the potential for groundwater contamination represent the primary environmental challenges associated with the technology..

== Current implementations ==
In 2006, Shell received a Bureau of Land Management lease to pursue a large demonstration with a capacity of 1,500 barrels per day (240 m^{3}/d); Shell has since dropped those plans and is planning a test based on ICP that would produce a total of minimum 1,500 barrels (240 m^{3}), together with nahcolite, over a seven-year period.

In Israel, IEI, a subsidiary of IDT Corp. is planning a shale pilot based on ICP technology. The project would produce a total of 1,500 barrels. However, IEI has also announced that any subsequent projects would not use ICP technology, but would instead utilize horizontal wells and hot gas heating methods.

In Jordan, Shell subsidiary JOSCO plans to use ICP technology to achieve commercial production by the "late 2020s." In October, 2011, it was reported that JOSCO had drilled more than 100 test holes over the prior two years, apparently for the sake of testing shale samples.

The Mahogany Oil Shale Project has been abandoned by Shell in 2013 due to unfavorable project economics

== See also ==
- Chevron CRUSH
- ExxonMobil Electrofrac
