= Chevron CRUSH =

Experimental shale oil extraction technology

- Process type: chemical
- Industrial sector(s): chemical industry, oil industry
- Feedstock: oil shale
- Product(s): shale oil
- Leading companies: Chevron Corporation
- Developer(s): Chevron Research Company; Los Alamos National Laboratory

Chevron CRUSH is an experimental in situ shale oil extraction technology to convert kerogen in oil shale to shale oil. The name stands for Chevron's Technology for the Recovery and Upgrading of Oil from Shale. It is developed jointly by Chevron Corporation and the Los Alamos National Laboratory.

== History ==
The Chevron CRUSH technology bases on the earlier in situ efforts. Sinclair Oil Corporation conducted an experiment using both natural and induced fractures to establish communication between wells and developing an in situ combustion process. Geokinetics, the Sandia National Laboratories, and the Laramie Energy Technology Center of the U.S. Department of Energy conducted field tests fracturing oil-shale formation by explosives and hydraulic fracturing technology. Equity Oil Company, Continental Oil Company and the University of Akron studied the benefit of carbon dioxide as a carrier gas to facilitate a higher yield of shale oil. Based on these works, Chevron Corporation and the Los Alamos National Laboratory started a cooperation in 2006 to improve the recovery of hydrocarbons from oil shale. In 2006, the United States Department of the Interior issued a research, development and demonstration lease for Chevron's demonstration project on public lands in Colorado’s Piceance Basin. In February 2012, Chevron notified the Bureau of Land Management and the Department of Reclamation, Mining and Safety that it intends to divest this lease.

== Process ==
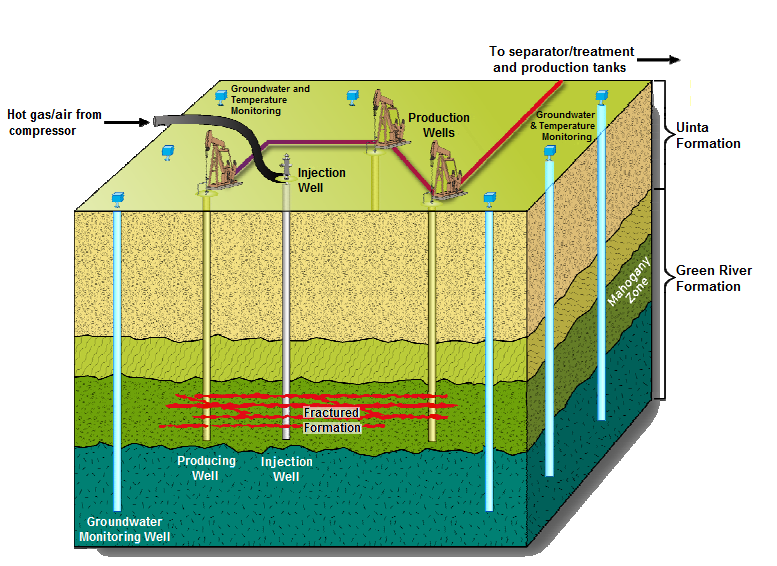
Chevron CRUSH process

For decomposition kerogen in oil shale, the Chevron CRUSH process uses heated carbon dioxide. The process involves drilling vertical wells into the oil shale formation and applying horizontal fractures induced by injecting carbon dioxide through drilled wells and then pressured through the formation for circulation through the fractured intervals to rubblize the production zone. For further rubblization propellants and explosives may be used. The used carbon dioxide then be routed to the gas generator to be reheated and recycled. The remaining organic matter in previously heated and depleted zones is combusted in-situ to generate the heated gases required to process successive intervals. These gases would then be pressured from the depleted zone into the newly fractured portion of the formation and the process would be repeated. The hydrocarbon fluids are brought up in conventional vertical oil wells.

== Isolation of groundwater ==
The processing area is isolated from surrounding groundwater by creating fractured areas ("pockets"), approximately 1 to 5 acres (4,000 to 20,200 m^{2}) wide and 50 feet (15 m) high within the center of the oil shale deposit. In this way, about 75 feet (23 m) of the confining layer would separate the process area from the water bearing layers above and below, keeping the aquifers out of the production zone.

== See also ==
- Shell in situ conversion process
- ExxonMobil Electrofrac
