= LLNL RISE process =

Experimental shale oil extraction technology

LLNL RISE
- Process type: chemical
- Industrial sector(s): Chemical industry, oil industry
- Feedstock: oil shale
- Product(s): shale oil
- Developer(s): Lawrence Livermore National Laboratory

The LLNL RISE process was an experimental shale oil extraction technology developed by the Lawrence Livermore National Laboratory. The name comes from the abbreviation of the Lawrence Livermore National Laboratory and words 'rubble in situ extraction'.

LLNL RISE is a modified in situ extraction technology originally proposed by Rio Blanco Oil Shale Co. and developed by the Lawrence Livermore National Laboratory. It is classified as an internal combustion technology. The process was described in 1975 by Lewis A. E. and A. J. Rothman.

In the LLNL RISE process a part of the oil shale deposit (roughly 20% of the total deposit) is removed by the conventional mining technique. The remaining deposit is then broken up with explosives to increase porosity of the deposit. As a result, a large underground retort chamber by 20 to 100 metres (66 to 328 ft) square and 100 to 300 metres (330 to 980 ft) high is created. The retort chamber is ignited at the top. The combustion zone moves downward as an oxygen gas provided, similar to the process developed by the Occidental Petroleum. The heat causes retorting process converting kerogen in oil shale to oil shale gas and shale oil vapors. Some oil is collected at the bottom of the retort, other collected at the surface as vapors.

The process was never used commercially. It was tested by using an experimental simulated retort with capacity of 6 tonnes of oil shale per day.
