= Independent Energy Partners =

Oil shale resources company

Independent Energy Partners, Inc.
- Industry: Oil shale
- Founded: 1991
- Headquarters: Parker, Colorado, United States
- Key people: Alan K. Forbes (President and CEO); Marshall_Savage (Vice President, Technology Development); John Brown (Vice President Corporate Finance); Mark Wall (Manager of Projects)
- Number of employees: 7
- Website: www.iepm.com

Independent Energy Partners, Inc. (IEP) is an oil shale resources company based in Parker, Colorado, the United States. It is a developer of the Geothermic Fuels Cells Process, an in-situ shale oil extraction process. CEO of the company is Alan K. Forbes.

== History ==
IEP was founded in 1991 as an energy project and technology development company. Since 2002, it has focused on the development of its Geothermic Fuel Cell technology. On February 3, 2004, IEP received an initial patent on the Geothermic Fuels Cells and on April 13, 2005, IEP retained the consulting firm Sage Geotech to produce technical assessments related to this technology. On March 1, 2006, IEP concluded negotiations with Battelle Memorial Institute, the operator of the Pacific Northwest National Laboratory, for development of the Geothermic Fuel Cell prototype and in September 2008, they signed agreements for modeling, analysis, design and engineering to commercialize this technology and related applications. The continuation-in-part application for the Geothermic Fuel Cell Process was issued by the United States Patent and Trademark Office on February 27, 2007.

In August 2005, IEP concluded has mineral interests lease within the Green River Formation. In August 2008, IEP signed a partnership agreement with Total S.A.

== Operations ==
IEP owns the patents to the Geothermic Fuel Cell technology (US Patent Nos. 6,684,948 B1-Apparatus and Method For Heating Subterranean Formations Using Fuel Cells and 7,182,132 B2-Linearly Scalable Geothermic Fuel Cells). Fuel cells are developed by Delphi Corporation.

IEP owns mineral interests in the oil shale reserves within the Green River Formation, including in Rio Blanco County, Colorado.

== Geothermic Fuels Cells Technology ==
In the Independent Energy Partners' Geothermic Fuels Cells (GFC), a high-temperature stack of fuel cells is placed in situ or in place within a formation. During an initial warm-up period, the cells are fueled by an external source of natural gas. Afterwards, the process is able to fuel itself using oil shale gas generated by its own waste heat. The formation is fractured by rising fluid pressure in the heated zone. Alternatively, the formation can be pre-fractured to enhance the shale oil flow between heating and producing wells. The company asserts a ratio of approximately 7 units of energy produced per unit used, when primary recovery is combined with gasification of the residual char and use of the resulting oil shale gas. In addition, the fuel cell produces electric power as a by-product of the process.

== Oil Shale Alliance ==
IEP together with Petro Probe, Inc. and Phoenix Wyoming, Inc have formed the Oil Shale Alliance, Inc., a Delaware corporation for the purpose of commercialization of in-situ oil shale technologies.
