= Ambre Energy =

Ambre Energy Limited is an Australian coal and oil shale company. It has offices in Brisbane and Salt Lake City.

== History ==
Ambre Energy was founded in June 2005 by Edek Choros, a geologist and mining engineer. In September 2005, Ambre Energy filed a patent for the Hybrid Energy System, a method for processing low value coal and other carbonaceous materials.

In April 2006, Ambre Energy started negotiations with American oil shale technology company Oil-Tech, Inc., incorporated in February 2000 in Utah. Oil-Tech, Inc. was a developer of the Oil-Tech staged electrically heated retort process for the oil shale pyrolysis. In October 2006, Ambre Energy and Oil-Tech established Millennium Synfuels, LLC, which take over property rights of the retorting technology. By 30 June 2007, Ambre Energy acquired 6% of Oil Tech and 17 October 2007, it acquired 35%. Further Oil Tech become a wholly owned subsidiary of Ambre Energy and as of 21 July 2008, was merged into Ambre Energy.

== Felton Clean Coal Project ==
Ambre Energy is planning to build and operate a clean coal gasification plant at Felton Valley, 30 kilometres (19 mi) south west of Toowoomba, Queensland. The plan includes construction of an open-pit coal mine, and carbon capture facility. At the final stage, the plant is expected to produce enough gas for production of 2.8 million tonnes per year of dimethyl ether and generate 650 MW of electricity. It is also expected to produce by-products for fertilizer production, and olefins and plastics manufacturing.

In April 2012, Campbell Newman, the then-incoming premier of Queensland, rejected the plans, with The Australian reporting that Ambre Energy was "at risk of financial collapse" in the wake of the decision. The company issued an official response to the article refuting the claim, adding that the Felton project "remains in the early investigation stage."

In December 2016, plans to mine in Felton resurfaced after Ambre Energy had two coal exploration permits renewed by the Queensland state government.

== North American operations ==
In February 2009, it was announced that Ambre Energy were seeking to construct a coal plant in southeastern Montana for US$375 million that would produce up to 4.4 million tons of coal and 1.6 million barrels of synthetic crude annually. The company went on to acquire a 50% share in a mine in Decker, with Cloud Peak Energy owning the other 50%. However, in July 2012, Cloud Peak sued Ambre Energy, alleging that Ambre Energy's export plans for the mine were "developed without Cloud Peak's approval" and that Ambre Energy "intend to keep for themselves a disproportionate share of any potential value of the coal" from the mine. In December 2012, Cloud Peak agreed to sell their share of the mine to Ambre Energy for US$57 million, but in May 2013, it was announced that the deal was being renegotiated.

In November 2010, plans to build a coal export terminal in Longview, Washington, by Millenium Bulk Logistics, a subsidiary of Ambre Energy, were announced. Permits were approved by Cowlitz County commissioners later the same month, but in March 2011, Millenium Bulk Logistics withdrew the plans with an intention to resubmit their application "after doing environmental studies." The initial application provided an exportation target of 5.7 million tons of coal per year, but reports suggested Ambre Energy had plans to export as much as 80 million tons annually. In addition to this project, later plans to build a storage facility in the Port of Morrow and the Port of St. Helens in Oregon faced public opposition and were eventually rejected by state regulators in September 2014, citing potential damage to marine and riparian ecosystems and a potential threat to fishing grounds long used by Native American tribes in the region.

In December 2014, Ambre Energy sold all of its North American assets to Denver-based private equity firm Resource Capital Funds for US$18 million, with the new company continuing operations as Ambre Energy North America. In April 2015, Ambre Energy North America changed its name to Lighthouse Resources Inc., but made no changes to the company's leadership.

== Oil-Tech process ==
Ambre Energy operates a small Oil-Tech-type of shale oil extraction pilot plant and 34,000 acres (140 km^{2}) of oil shale leases, approximately 40 miles (64 km) southeast of Vernal, Utah. In Oil-Tech process, crushed oil shale is lifted by a conveyor system to the vertical retort, and is loaded into the retort from the top. The retort consists of a series of connected individual heating chambers, stacked atop each other. Heating rods extend into the centers of each of these chambers. The feed oil shale is heated to increasingly higher temperatures as it moves down the retort, attaining a temperature of 1,000 °F (540 °C) in the lowest chamber. The gases and vapors are vacuumed into a condensing unit. The spent shale is used for pre-heating feed oil shale. The advantages of this technology are its modular design, which enhances its portability and adaptability, its low water requirements, its heating efficiency, and the relatively high quality of the resulting product.
