= Red Leaf Resources =

Red Leaf Resources, Inc
- Industry: Oil shale industry
- Headquarters: Salt Lake City, United States
- Key people: Michael Binnion (Chairman of the Board); Jason D'Silva (Director); Patrick Quinlan (Director)
- Website: redleafinc.com

Red Leaf Resources, Inc, doing business as Green Leaf Carbon Technologies, is an oil-shale technology company based in Salt Lake City, Utah, United States. It is the developer of the shale oil extraction technology HCCO^{®} (Homogeneous Charged Continuous Oxidation) Process. The company holds mineral leases in Utah for oil shale development that can support 75,000 bbl/day of oil production. Its Uintah Partners LLC subsidiary also holds surface rights in the Uinta Basin with a permit for a 40,000 barrel per day refinery. The company is affiliated with Questerre Energy Corporation.

== Technology ==
The Green Leaf Carbon Technologies process for converting organic-rich material (primarily kerogen) to synthetic oil and gas is called the HCCO^{®} Process. The process retorts mined kerogen ore in a closed steel vessel. Heat is moved continuously through the stationary bed with a fuel gas that is produced along with oil from the system. Heat is recovered by exposing the leading edge of the heat front to fresh ore. When all the oil is recovered from one vessel and the spent ore has been cooled, the vessel is offloaded and reloaded with fresh kerogen ore. Typically, three vessels are grouped together in a pod with two vessels involved in the heat movement and oil production while the third vessel is on turnaround. By using pure oxygen with the fuel gas, essentially pure CO_{2} is produced which is directly amenable to geologic sequestration or for use (such as for enhanced oil recovery operations). Sufficient fuel gas is produced by the process to satisfy the heat requirements of the retort and to generate sufficient electricity for the process requirements, thereby eliminating the need for any external fuel sources. The process promises production of ‘blue oil’, that is, oil that has been produced with zero CO_{2} emissions.

== Operations ==
Green Leaf Carbon Technologies controls oil shale leases covering about 16,000 acres (65 km^{2}) on State of Utah School and Institutional Trust Lands in eastern Utah. The acreage represents about 1.1 billion barrels (170 million cubic metres) of shale oil. Its 2009 pilot project produced more than 300 barrels (48 m^{3}) of oil. In 2012, the company formed a joint venture with Total S.A. to launch commercial scale production of 9,800 barrels per day (1,560 m^{3}/d), utilizing the company's first-generation EcoShale In-Capsule process on its oil shale leases. In December 2013, a ground water permit was issued for the oil shale mine and shale oil plant. With the collapse of oil prices in 2014, the company undertook a process to redesign its shale oil extraction technology to lower its capital and operating costs and improve its environmental footprint. The HCCO^{®} Process is the culmination of those efforts and Green Leaf Carbon Technologies is now pursuing commercial demonstration of the technology.

== Key People ==
Michael Binnion is the chairman of the board of directors. Jason D’Silva is a director and the Chair of the Audit Committee. Patrick Quinlan is a director and the Chair of the Compensation Committee.
