= Combustion Resources =

American consulting company

Combustion Resources, LLC is a consulting company based in Provo, Utah, United States. It provides consulting services in the fields of fuel and combustion, such as testing of flow and mixing systems, reactor design, gas and particle sampling, gasification modeling, and shale oil extraction design and testing. The company was incorporated in 1995 as a spin-off from the Center for Advanced Combustion Engineering Research, joint collaboration between Brigham Young University and the University of Utah.

== Shale oil extraction ==
Combustion Resources worked under a grant from the US Department of Energy to research and optimize current designs of shale oil extraction. It sought to eliminate carbon dioxide emissions from the shale oil production process. Pyrolysis occurs in a rotating kiln heated by hot gas flowing through an outer annulus. The hot gas is created by burning hydrogen generated in a separate unit by coal gasification followed by carbon dioxide separation. The geometry of the annulus enables the transfer of heat to the moving shale through a wall.

== Clean coke processing ==
Combustion Resources developed an alternative coke making process. As part of this process, waste coals and other materials are blended and then bound together and briquetted. The green coke briquettes are then calcined in a furnace yielding metallurgical quality coke.
