= Thermal dissolution =

Thermal dissolution is a method of liquefaction of solid fossil fuels. It is a hydrogen-donor solvent refining process. It may be used for the shale oil extraction and coal liquefaction. Other liquids extraction processes from solid fuels are pyrolysis and hydrogenation. Compared to hydrogenation, the process of thermal dissolution has milder conditions, simpler process, and no consumption of catalyst.
