= Omnishale process =

Omnishale
- Process type: chemical
- Industrial sector(s): Chemical industry, oil industry
- Feedstock: oil shale
- Product(s): shale oil
- Leading companies: General Synfuels International
- Inventor: Ron McQueen
- Developer(s): General Synfuels International

Omnishale process (also known as the Petro Probe process) is an in situ shale oil extraction technology to convert kerogen in oil shale to shale oil. This process is classified as an externally generated hot gas technology. The technology is developed by General Synfuels International, a subsidiary of Earth Search Sciences.

== History ==
The Omnishale shale oil extraction in situ technology was invented by Ron McQueen and developed and tested by Petro Probe and General Synfuels International. On 11 October 2005, a subsidiary of Earth Search Sciences Petro Probe acquired an unlimited license to use Omnishale shale oil extraction technology developed by General Synfuels International, Inc. On 15 August 2008, Earth Search Sciences acquired General Synfuels International and oil shale activities of Petro Probe were transferred to General Synfuels International. In 2009, General Synfuels International started a cooperation with Anadarko Petroleum. On 30 March 2010, General Synfuels International started construction of the test plant on the Anadarko-controlled test site near Rock Springs, Wyoming, in the Green River Formation. In April 2010, a $10 million Patriot's Oil Shale Technology Fund L.P. was formed to complete funding of the Phase 1 construction of the test shale oil plant.

== Technology ==
The Omnishale shale oil extraction in situ technology of Earth Search Sciences was invented by Ron McQueen and developed by Petro Probe and General Synfuels International. In this process, holes are drilled into the oil shale formation and a processing inlet conduit is placed within holes. Pressurized air super heated by an above-ground combustor is directed into the oil shale formation through the inlet conduit. As a result, the kerogen in oil shale is heated and converted to a gaseous state.
