= ExxonMobil Electrofrac =

Oil extraction technology

- Process type: chemical
- Industrial sector(s): chemical industry, oil industry
- Feedstock: oil shale
- Product(s): shale oil
- Leading companies: ExxonMobil
- Developer(s): ExxonMobil

ExxonMobil Electrofrac is an in situ shale oil extraction technology proposed by ExxonMobil for converting kerogen in oil shale to shale oil.

== Technology ==
ExxonMobil Electrofrac uses a series of fractures created in the oil shale formation. Preferably these fractures should be longitudinal vertical fractures created from horizontal wells and conducting electricity from the heel to the toe of each heating well. For conductivity, an electrically-conductive material such as calcined petroleum coke is injected into the wells in fractures, forming a heating element. Heating wells are placed in a parallel row with a second horizontal well intersecting them at their toe. This allows opposing electrical charges to be applied at either end. Laboratory experiments have demonstrated that electrical continuity is unaffected by kerogen conversion and that hydrocarbons are expelled from heated oil shale even under in situ stress. Planar heaters should be used because they require fewer wells than wellbore heaters and offer a reduced surface footprint. The shale oil is extracted by separate dedicated production wells.

== See also ==
- Shell in situ conversion process
- Chevron CRUSH
