= Lurgi–Ruhrgas process =

Coal liquefaction process

- Process type: Chemical
- Industrial sector(s): Chemical industry oil industry
- Feedstock: oil shale coal
- Product(s): shale oil synthetic fuel
- Developer(s): Lurgi Gesellschaft für Wärmetechnik G.m.b.H. Ruhrgas AG

The Lurgi–Ruhrgas process is an above-ground coal liquefaction and shale-oil extraction technology. It is classified as a hot recycled solids technology.

== History ==
The Lurgi–Ruhrgas process was originally invented in the 1940s and further developed in the 1950s for a low-temperature liquefaction of lignite (brown coal). The technology is named after its developers Lurgi Gesellschaft für Wärmetechnik G.m.b.H. and Ruhrgas AG. The process was used for coal processing in Japan, Germany, the United Kingdom, Argentina, and former Yugoslavia. The plant in Japan also processed cracking petroleum oils to olefins.

In 1947–1949, the Lurgi–Ruhrgas process was used in Germany for shale-oil production. In Lukavac, Bosnia and Herzegovina, two retorts for liquefaction of lignite were in operation from 1963 to 1968. The capacity of the plant was 850 tons of lignite per day. Initially, two Lurgi-Ruhrgas plants were built and operated in the UK: the first to be opened (by Queen Elizabeth II in 1963) was the Westfield plant in Fife, Scotland, which was operated by the Scottish Gas Board. The second plant, also opened in 1963, was sited near Coleshill in the West Midlands and was operated by the West Midlands Gas Board. A third, smaller plant, was sited in Lincolnshire, UK, but only operated during 1978–1979 with a maximum capacity of 900 tons of coal per day.

In the late 1960s and early 1970s, oil shales from different European countries and from the Green River Formation of Colorado, USA, were tested at the Lurgi's pilot plant in Frankfurt. In the United States, the technology was promoted in cooperation with Dravo Corporation. In the 1970s, the technology was licensed to the Rio Blanco Shale Oil Project for construction of a modular retort in combination with the modified in situ process. However, this plan was terminated.

In 1974, the Westfield plant in Scotland was converted to a new Lurgi "slagging gasifier" system developed jointly by British Gas and the Lurgi company. Whilst this British Gas–Lurgi process was never used commercially in the UK, similar designs are now being built and operated in China. This converted plant finally ceased gas production in early 1998, with the site lying dormant until a demolition order was given in 2014.

In 1980, the Natural Resources Authority of Jordan commissioned from the Klöckner-Lurgi consortium a pre-feasibility study of construction of an oil-shale-retorting complex in Jordan using the Lurgi–Ruhrgas process. However, although the study found the technology feasible, it was never implemented.

== Technology ==
The Lurgi–Ruhrgas process is a hot recycled solids technology, which processes fine particles of coal or oil shale sized 0.25 to 0.5 inches (6.4 to 12.7 mm). As a heat carrier, it uses spent char or spent oil shale (oil shale ash), mixed with sand or other more durable materials. In this process, crushed coal or oil shale is fed into the top of the retort. In retort, coal or oil shale is mixed with the 550 °C (1,020 °F) heated char or spent oil shale particles in the mechanical mixer (screw conveyor). The heat is transferred from the heated char or spent oil shale to the coal or raw oil shale, causing pyrolysis. As a result, oil shale decomposes to shale oil vapors, oil shale gas, and spent oil shale. The oil vapor and product gases pass through a hot cyclone for cleaning before sending to a condenser. In the condenser, shale oil is separated from product gases.

The spent oil shale, still including residual carbon (char), is burnt at a lift pipe combustor to heat the process. If necessary, additional fuel oil is used for combustion. During the combustion process, heated solid particles in the pipe are moved to the surge bin by pre-heated air that is introduced from the bottom of the pipe. At the surge bin, solids and gases are separated, and solid particles are transferred to the mixer unit to conduct the pyrolysis of the raw oil shale.

One of the disadvantages of this technology is the fact that produced shale oil vapors are mixed with shale ash, causing impurities in shale oil. Ensuring the quality of produced shale oil is complicated, because compared with other mineral dusts, the shale ash is more difficult to collect.

== See also ==
- Galoter process
- Alberta Taciuk process
- Petrosix process
- Kiviter process
- TOSCO II process
- Fushun process
- Paraho process
- KENTORT II
- Union process
