= Retort =

Any of various heated vessels used in chemistry or industry

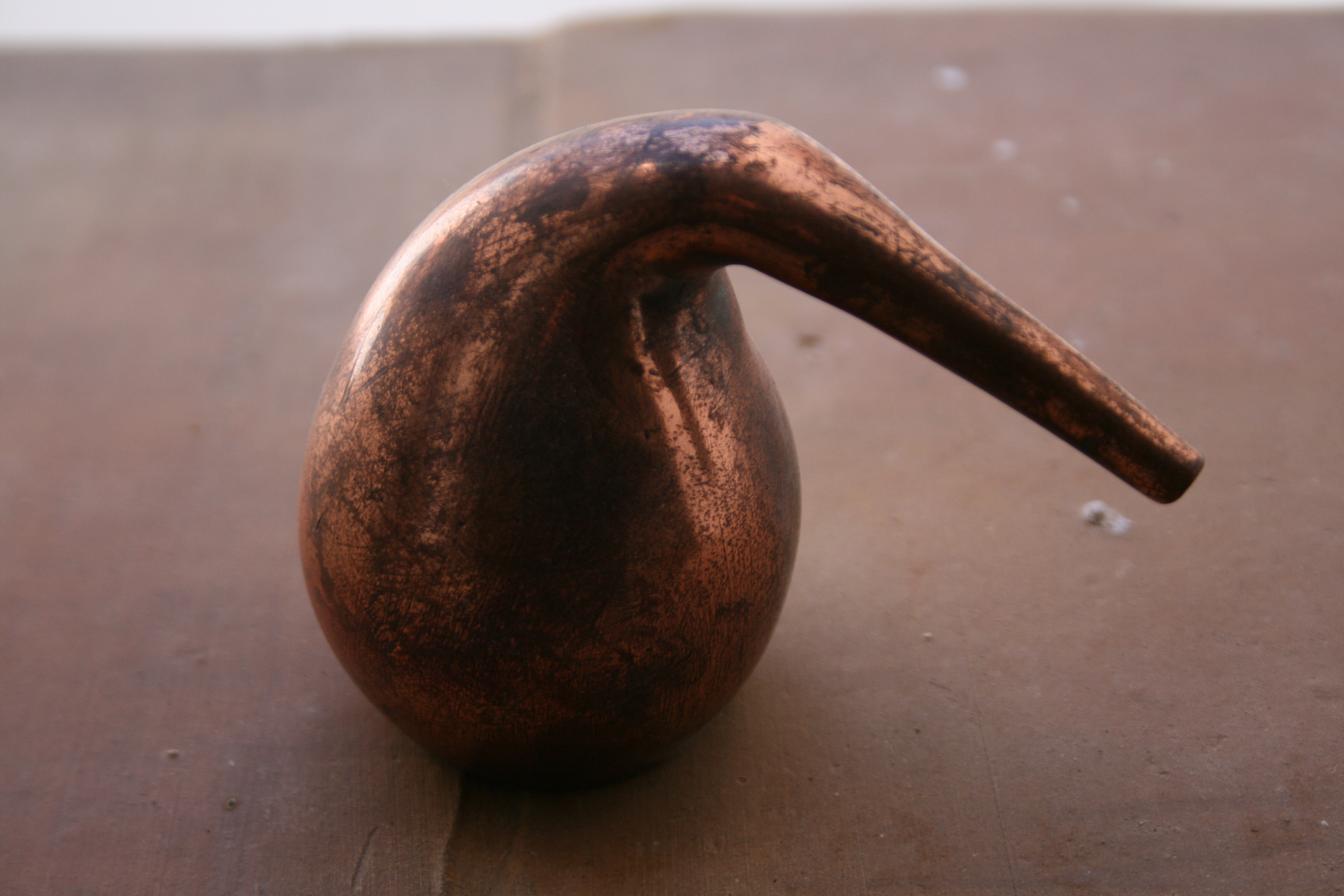
A copper retort

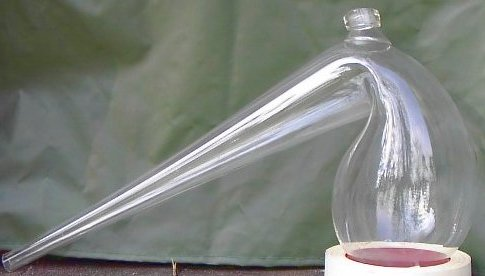
A glass retort

In a chemistry laboratory, a retort is a device used for distillation or dry distillation of substances. It consists of a spherical vessel with a long downward-pointing neck. The liquid to be distilled is placed in the vessel and heated. The neck acts as a condenser, allowing the vapors to condense and flow along the neck to a collection vessel placed underneath.

In the chemical industry, a retort is an airtight vessel in which substances are heated for a chemical reaction producing gaseous products to be collected in a collection vessel or for further processing. Such industrial-scale retorts are used in shale-oil extraction, in the production of charcoal and in the recovery of mercury in gold-mining processes or from hazardous waste. A process of heating oil shale to produce shale oil, oil shale gas, and spent shale is commonly called retorting. Airtight vessels to apply pressure as well as heat are called autoclaves.

In the food industry, pressure cookers are often referred to as "retorts", meaning "canning retorts" for sterilization under high temperature (116–130 °C).

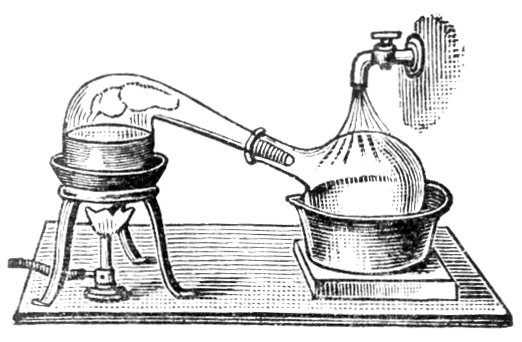
Retort in use

== History ==
Retorts were widely used by alchemists, and images of retorts appear in many drawings and sketches of their laboratories. Before the advent of modern condensers, retorts were used by many prominent chemists, such as Antoine Lavoisier and Jöns Berzelius.

An early method for producing phosphorus starts by roasting bones, and uses clay retorts encased in a very hot brick furnace to distill out the highly toxic product.

The term retort comes by way of Middle French, but ultimately from Latin retortus, twisted back, for the shape of the neck.

== Role in analytical chemistry ==
In laboratory use, due to advances in technology, especially the invention of the Liebig condenser, retorts were largely considered to have been rendered obsolete as early as the beginning of the 20th century. However, some laboratory techniques that involve simple distillation and do not require sophisticated apparatus may use a retort as a substitute for more complex distillation equipment.

== In biochar-pyrolysis industry ==
A retort is a reactor that has the ability to pyrolyze pile-wood, or wood logs over 30 centimetres (12 in) long and up to 18 centimetres (7.1 in) in diameter.

== See also ==
- Alembic
- Retort pouch
- Retort stand
