= Geokinetics =

Defunct geological survey business

Geokinetics Inc.
- Company type: Private company
- Traded as: AMEX: GOK
- Industry: Oil Well Services & Equipment
- Founded: 1969
- Defunct: 2018
- Headquarters: Westchase, Houston, Texas
- Key people: President & CEO: David Crowley; VP & CFO: Gary Pitmann
- Products: Seismic Exploration, Processing & Interpretation, Multi-Client Services
- Revenue: $43.145 million USD (2004)
- Number of employees: 4,000
- Website: www.geokinetics.com

Geokinetics Inc. was founded in 1997 and was based in Houston, Texas. The company is no longer in business. Through its subsidiary, Geokinetics provided seismic surveying services in the Gulf Coast, Mid-Continent, and Rocky Mountain regions of the United States. Geokinetics USA, Inc. was formerly known as Quantum Geophysical, Inc. and changed its name to Geokinetics USA, Inc. in October 2007. Geokinetics USA, Inc. operates as a subsidiary of Geokinetics Inc. and was a seismic data services to the oil and gas industry. The company had its headquarters in Westchase, Houston, Texas.

== Background ==
Headquartered in Houston, Texas, Geokinetics was one of the world's largest independent land and seafloor geophysical companies. The company specializes in acquiring and processing seismic data in challenging environments worldwide. Geokinetics’ Multi-Client Survey Library consists of both 2D and 3D data, covering conventional and unconventional plays throughout North America, Brazil and Mexico.

On October 31, 2018, Geokinetics USA, Inc., went out of business as per its Chapter 11 liquidation filing under bankruptcy for the second time since 2013.

== See also ==
- List of oilfield service companies
