= Fischer assay =

The Fischer assay is a standardized laboratory test for determining the oil yield from oil shale to be expected from a conventional shale oil extraction. A 100 gram oil shale sample crushed to <2.38 mm is heated in a small aluminum retort to 500 °C (930 °F) at a rate of 12°C/min (22°F/min), and held at that temperature for 40 minutes. The distilled vapors of oil, gas, and water are passed through a condenser and cooled with ice water into a graduated centrifuge tube. The oil yields achieved by other technologies are often reported as a percentage of the Fischer Assay oil yield.

The original Fischer Assay test was developed in the early low temperature coal retorting research by Franz Joseph Emil Fischer and Hans Schrader. It was adapted for evaluating oil shale yields in 1949 by K. E. Stanfield and I. C. Frost.

== See also ==
- Fischer–Tropsch process
