= Alberta Taciuk process =

Oil extraction technology

Alberta Taciuk process AOSTRA Taciuk process
- Process type: Chemical
- Industrial sector(s): Chemical industry oil industry
- Feedstock: oil shale oil sands organics-bearing materials
- Product(s): shale oil synthetic crude
- Leading companies: UMATAC Industrial Processes; Queensland Energy Resources; United States Environmental Protection Agency
- Main facilities: Stuart Oil Shale Plant
- Inventor: William Taciuk
- Year of invention: 1975
- Developer(s): UMATAC Industrial Processes

The Alberta Taciuk process (ATP; known also as the AOSTRA Taciuk process) is an above-ground dry thermal retorting technology for extracting oil from oil sands, oil shale and other organics-bearing materials, including oil contaminated soils, sludges and wastes. The technology is named after its inventor William Taciuk and the Alberta Oil Sands Technology and Research Authority.

== History ==
The research and development of the ATP technology started in 1970. In 1975, its inventor, William Taciuk, formed the UMATAC Industrial Processes (now part of Polysius) to further its development. The first ATP pilot plant was constructed in 1977.

The ATP was originally developed for pyrolysis of oil sand. However, its first commercial application in 1989 was dedicated to the environmental remediation of contaminated soils. From 1999 to 2004, ATP technology was used for shale oil extraction at the Stuart Oil Shale Plant in Australia. During that time, 1.5 million barrels (238.48×10^{3} m^{3}) of shale oil was extracted before the owner, Southern Pacific Petroleum Pty Ltd went into receivership. The subsequent owner, Queensland Energy Resources closed and dismantled the plant.

In 2002, Estonian company Viru Keemia Grupp tested this technology; however, it was not taken into use.

== Technology ==
The ATP is an above-ground oil-shale retorting technology classified as a hot recycled solids technology. The distinguishing feature of the ATP is that the drying and pyrolysis of the oil shale or other feed, as well as the combustion, recycling, and cooling of spent materials and residues, all occur within a single rotating multi-chamber horizontal retort. Its feed consists of fine particles.

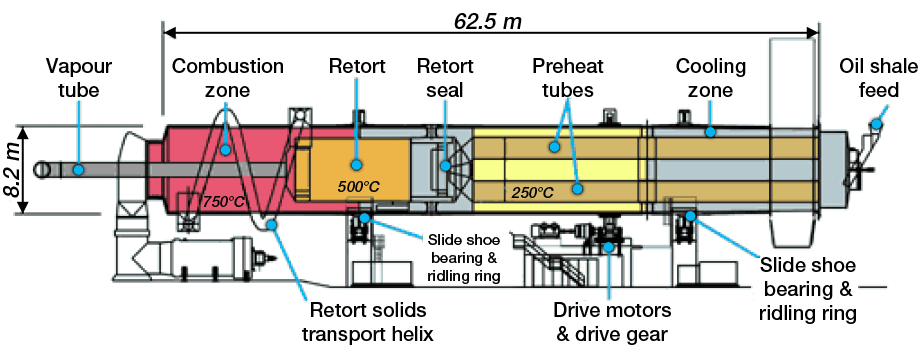
Alberta Taciuk Processor (ATP) retort

In its shale-oil applications, fine particles (less than 25 millimetres (1.0 in) in diameter) are fed into the preheat tubes of the retort, where they are dried and preheated to 250 °C (480 °F) indirectly by hot shale ash and hot flue gas. In the pyrolysis zone, oil shale particles are mixed with hot shale ash and the pyrolysis is performed at temperatures between 500 °C (930 °F) and 550 °C (1,020 °F). The resulting shale oil vapor is withdrawn from the retort through a vapour tube and recovered by condensation in other equipment. The char residues, mixed with ash, are moved to the combustion zone, and burnt at about 800 °C (1,470 °F) to form shale ash. Part of the ash is delivered to the pyrolysis zone, where its heat is recycled as a hot solid carrier; the other part is removed and cooled in the cooling zone with the combustion gases by heat transfer to the feed oil shale.

The advantages of the ATP technology for shale oil extraction lie in its simple and robust design, energy self-sufficiency, minimal process water requirements, ability to handle fine particles, and high oil yields. It is particularly suited for processing materials with otherwise low oil yield. The mechanical transfer of solids through the machine does not involve moving parts and it achieves improved process efficiencies through solid-to-solid heat transfer. Most of the process energy (over 80%) is produced by combustion of char and produced oil shale gas; external energy inputs are minimal. The oil yields are about 85–90% of Fischer Assay. The organic carbon content of the process residue (spent shale) is less than 3%. The process produces only small amounts of contaminated water with low concentrations of phenols. These advantages also apply to its oil sands applications, including increased oil yield, a simplified process flow, reduction of bitumen losses to tailings, elimination of the need for tailing ponds, improvement in energy efficiency compared with the hot water extraction process, and elimination of requirements for chemical and other additives.

A complication of the ATP is that retorting operations can reach temperatures at which carbonate minerals within the shale decompose, increasing greenhouse gas emissions.

== Operations ==
As of 2008, ATP was used by the United States Environmental Protection Agency at a PCB-contaminated site near Buffalo, New York, and at the Waukegan Harbor, Illinois.

UMATAC Industrial Processes runs a 5 tons of oil shale per hour pilot processor in Calgary, Alberta for large scale tests of different oil shales. The Fushun Mining Group of China has built a 250 tonnes per hour ATP plant that began commissioning in 2010. Jordan Energy and Mining Ltd planned to use the ATP technology for extracting oil from Al Lajjun and Attarat oil shale deposits in Jordan.

== See also ==
- Shale oil extraction
- Galoter process
- Petrosix process
- Kiviter process
- TOSCO II process
- Fushun process
- Paraho process
- Lurgi–Ruhrgas process
