= Paraho process =

Shale oil extraction technology

- Process type: Chemical
- Industrial sector(s): Chemical industry oil industry
- Feedstock: oil shale
- Product(s): shale oil
- Leading companies: Paraho Development Corporation
- Inventor: John B. Jones, Jr.
- Developer(s): Development Engineering, Inc.

The Paraho process is an above ground retorting technology for shale oil extraction. The name "Paraho" is delivered from the words "para homem", which means in Portuguese "for mankind".

== History ==
The Paraho process was invented by John B. Jones, Jr., later president of the Paraho Development Corporation, and developed by Development Engineering, Inc., in the late 1960s. Its design was based on a gas combustion retort developed by the United States Bureau of Mines and the earlier Nevada–Texas–Utah Retort. In the late 1940s, these retorts were tested in the Oil Shale Experiment Station at Anvil Points in Rifle, Colorado. In 1971, the Standard Oil of Ohio started to cooperate with Mr. John B. Jones providing financial support for obtaining an oil shale lease at Anvil Points. In May 1972, the lease was approved. Before leasing a track at Anvil Points, a test of using the Paraho Direct process for limestone calcination in cement kilns was carried out.

The consortium for developing the Anvil Points lease – the Paraho Development Corporation – was formed in 1973. In addition to the Standard Oil of Ohio, other participants of the consortium were Atlantic Richfield, Carter Oil, Chevron Research, Cleveland-Cliffs Iron, Gulf Oil, Kerr-McKee, Marathon Oil, Arthur G. McKee, Mobil Research, Phillips Petroleum Company, Shell Development, Southern California Edison, Standard Oil Company (Indiana), Sun Oil, Texaco, and the Webb-Chambers-Gary-McLoraine Group. Shale oil retorting started in 1974 when two operational retorts – pilot plant and semiworks – were put into operation. The semiworks unit achieved a maximum throughput capacity of 290 tons (263 tonnes) of raw oil shale per day. In March 1976, the Paraho Development Corporation tested a modification of its technology – the Paraho Indirect process. The Anvil Points lease was closed in 1978.

In 1976–1978, under the contracts with the United States Navy, Paraho technology was used for production of 100,000 barrels of crude shale oil. It was tested for using as military transportation fuels. The Gary Western Refinery in Fruita, Colorado, refined the Paraho shale oil for production of gasoline, jet fuels, diesel fuel marine, and heavy fuel oil. Paraho JP-4 aviation fuel was tested by the United States Air Force in the T-39 jet aircraft flight, which took a place between the Wright Patterson Air Force Base (Dayton, Ohio) and the Carswell Air Force Base (Fort Worth, Texas). In addition, the Paraho heavy fuel oil was used for fueling a Cleveland-Cliffs Iron ore carrier during its 7-day cruise on Great Lakes. On 13 June 1980, the Department of Energy awarded $4.4 million contract (participants providing additional $3.7 million) for an 18-month study to construct an 18,000 TPD modular demonstration shale oil plant producing 10,000 BPD on a lease 40 miles southeast of Vernal, Utah. The demonstration module was never built.

In 1982, Paraho’s semi-works plant was torn down when the Anvil Points station was decommissioned, but the pilot plant was moved to an adjacent plot of private land.

In 1987, Paraho reorganized as New Paraho and began production of SOMAT asphalt additive used in test strips in 5 States. In 1991, New PARAHO reported successful tests of SOMAT shale oil asphalt additive.

On 28 June 2000, Shale Technologies purchased Paraho Development Corporation and became owner of the proprietary information relating to the Paraho oil shale retorting technologies.

On 14 August 2008, Queensland Energy Resources announced that it will use the Paraho Indirect technology for its Stuart Oil Shale Project.

== Technology ==
The Paraho process can be operated in two different heating modes, which are direct and indirect. The Paraho Direct process evolved from gas combustion retort technology and is classified as an internal combustion method. Accordingly, the Paraho Direct retort is a vertical shaft retort similar to the Kiviter and Fushun retorts, used correspondingly in Estonia and China. However, compared to the earlier gas combustion retorts the Paraho retort's raw oil shale feeding mechanism, gas distributor, and discharge grate have different designs. In the Paraho Direct process, the crushed and screened raw oil shale is fed into the top of the retort through a rotating distributor. The oil shale descends the retort as a moving bed. The oil shale is heated by the rising combustion gases from the lower part of the retort and the kerogen in the shale decomposes at about 500 °C (932 °F) to oil vapour, shale oil gas and spent shale. Heat for pyrolysis comes from the combustion of char in the spent shale. The combustion takes place where air is injected at two levels in the middle of the retort below the pyrolysis section raising the temperature of the shale and the gas to 700 °C (1,292 °F) to 800 °C (1,472 °F). Collecting tubes at the top of the retort carry shale oil mist, evolved gases and combustion gases into the product separation unit, where oil, water and dust are separated from the gases. For combined removal of liquid droplets and particulates, a wet electrostatic precipitator is used. Cleaned gases from the precipitator are compressed in a compressor. Part of the gas from the compressor is recycled to the bottom of the retort to cool the combusted shale (shale ash) and carry the recovered heat back up the retort. Cooled shale ash exits the retort through the discharge grate in the bottom of the retort. After processing, shale ash is disposed of. The liquid oil is separated from produced water and may be further refined into high quality products. The mixture of evolved gases and combustions gases is available for use as a low quality fuel gas for drying or power generation.

The Paraho Indirect is classified as an externally generated hot gas technology . The Paraho Indirect retort configuration is similar to the Paraho Direct except that a part of the gas from the compressor is heated to between 600 °C (1,112 °F) to 800 °C (1,472 °F) in a separate furnace and injected into the retort instead of air. No combustion occurs in the Paraho Indirect retort itself. As a result, the fuel gas from the Paraho Indirect is not diluted with combustion gases and the char remains on the disposed spent shale.

The main advantage of the Paraho process is simplicity in process and design; it has few moving parts and therefore low construction and operating costs compared with more sophisticated technologies. The Paraho retort also consumes no water, which is especially important for oil shale extraction in areas with water scarcity. A disadvantage common to both the Paraho Direct and Paraho Indirect is that neither are able to process oil shale particles smaller than about 12 millimetres (0.5 in). These fines may account for 10 to 30 per cent of the crushed feed.

== Operations ==
- Shale Technologies LCC owns and operates a pilot Paraho retort near Rifle, Colorado.

== See also ==
- Alberta Taciuk Process
- Galoter process
- Fushun process
- Kiviter process
- Lurgi-Ruhrgas process
- Petrosix
- TOSCO II process
- Superior multimineral process
- Union process
