= TOSCO II process =

Shale oil extraction technology

- Process type: Chemical
- Industrial sector(s): Chemical industry oil industry
- Feedstock: oil shale
- Product(s): shale oil
- Main facilities: Colony Shale Oil Project
- Developer(s): Tosco Corporation

The TOSCO II process is an above-ground retorting technology for shale oil extraction, which uses fine particles of oil shale that are heated in a rotating kiln. The particularity of this process is that it uses hot ceramic balls for the heat transfer between the retort and a heater. The process was tested in a 40-tonnes-per-hour test facility near Parachute, Colorado.

== History ==
TOSCO II process is a refinement of the Swedish Aspeco process. The Tosco Corporation purchased its patent rights in 1952. In 1956, the Denver Research Institute performed research and development of this technology, including testing of a 24-ton-per-day pilot plant, which operated until 1966. Later the technology development was continued under Tosco's own directions. In 1964, Tosco, Standard Oil of Ohio, and Cleveland Cliffs Iron Company formed Colony Development, a joint venture company to develop the Colony Shale Oil Project and to commercialize the TOSCO II technology. The project was ended in April 1972.

== Technology ==
The TOSCO II process is classified as a hot recycled solids technology. It employs a horizontal rotating-kiln-type retort. In this process, oil shale is crushed smaller than 0.5 inches (13 mm) and enters the system through pneumatic lift pipes in which oil shale is elevated by hot gas streams and preheated to about 500 °F (260 °C). After entering into retort, oil shale is mixed with hot ceramic balls with temperatures of 1,200–1,600 °F (650–870 °C). This increases the oil-shale temperature to 900–1,100 °F (480–590 °C), in which pyrolysis occurs. In the pyrolysis process, kerogen decomposes to oil-shale gas and oil vapors, while the remainder of the oil shale forms spent shale. Vapors are transferred to a condensor (fractionator) for separation into various fractions. At the kiln passage, the spent shale and the ceramic balls are separated in a perforated rotating separation drum (trommel). The crushed spent shale falls through holes in the trommel, while ceramic balls are transferred to the ball heater. Combustible shale gas is burned in the ball heater to reheat the ceramic balls.

The overall thermal efficiency of the TOSCO II process is low because the energy of the spent shale is not recovered, and much of the produced shale gas is consumed by the process itself. The efficiency could be increased by burning char (carbonaceous residue in the spent shale) instead of shale gas as a fuel of the ball heater. The process's other disadvantages are mechanical complexity and large number of moving parts. Also, the lifetime of the ceramic balls is limited. Disposal of spent shale includes environmental problems because it is very finely crushed and contains carbon residue.

== See also ==
- Alberta Taciuk Process
- Kiviter process
- Petrosix process
- Galoter process
- Fushun process
- Paraho process
- Lurgi-Ruhrgas process
