= Petrosix =

Oil shale retort in São Mateus do Sul, Brazil

Petrosix process
- Process type: Chemical
- Industrial sector(s): Chemical industry oil industry
- Feedstock: oil shale
- Product(s): shale oil
- Leading companies: Petrobras
- Inventor: Petrobras
- Developer(s): Petrobras

Petrosix is the world's largest surface oil shale pyrolysis retort with an 11 metres (36 ft) diameter vertical shaft kiln, operational since 1992. It is located in São Mateus do Sul, Brazil, and it is owned and operated by the Brazil energy company Petrobras. Petrosix means also the Petrosix process, an externally generated hot gas technology of shale oil extraction. The technology is tailored to Irati oil shale formation, a Permian formation of the Paraná Basin.

== History ==
Petrobras started oil shale processing activities in 1953 by developing Petrosix technology for extracting oil from oil shale of the Irati formation. A 5.5 metres (18 ft) inside diameter semi-works retort (the Irati Profile Plant) with capacity of 2,400 tons per day, was brought on line in 1972, and began limited commercial operation in 1980. The first retort that used current Petrosix technology was a 0.2 metres (0.7 ft) internal diameter retort pilot plant started in 1982. It was followed by a 2 metres (6.6 ft) retort demonstration plant in 1984. A 11 metres (36 ft) retort was brought into service in December 1991, and commercial production started in 1992. The company operates two retorts which process 8,500 tons of oil shale daily.

== Retort ==
The Petrosix 11 metres (36 ft) vertical shaft retort is the world's largest operational surface oil shale pyrolysis reactor. It was designed by Cameron Engineers. The retort has the upper pyrolysis section and lower shale coke cooling section. The retort capacity is 6,200 tons of oil shale per day, and it yields a nominal daily output of 3,870 barrels of shale oil (i.e., 550 tons of oil, approximately 1 ton of oil per 11 tons of shale), 132 tons of oil shale gas, 50 tons of liquefied oil shale gas, and 82 tons of sulfur.

== Process ==
Petrosix is one of four technologies of shale oil extraction in commercial use. It is an above-ground retorting technology, which uses externally generated hot gas for the oil shale pyrolysis. After mining, the shale is transported by trucks to a crusher and screens, where it is reduced to particles (lump shale). These particles are between 12 millimetres (0.5 in) and 75 millimetres (3.0 in) and have an approximately parallelepipedic shape. These particles are transported on a belt to a vertical cylindrical vessel, where the shale is heated up to about 500 °C (932 °F) for pyrolysis. Oil shale enters through the top of the retort while hot gases are injected into the middle of the retort. The oil shale is heated by the gases as it moves down. As a result, the kerogen in the shale decomposes to yield oil vapor and more gas. Cold gas is injected into the bottom of the retort to cool and recover heat from the spent shale. Cooled spent shale is discharged through a water seal with drag conveyor below the retort. Oil mist and cooled gases are removed through the top of the retort and enter a wet electrostatic precipitator where the oil droplets are coalesced and collected. The gas from the precipitator is compressed and split into three parts.

One part of the compressed retort gas is heated in a furnace to 600 °C (1,112 °F) and recirculated back to the middle of the retort for heating and pyrolyzing the oil shale, and another part is circulated cold into the bottom of the retort, where it cools down the spent shale, heats up itself, and ascends into the pyrolysis section as a supplementary heat source for heating the oil shale. The third part undergoes further cooling for light oil (naphtha) and water removal and then sent to the gas treatment unit, where fuel gas and liquefied petroleum gas (LPG) are produced and sulfur recovered.

One drawback of this process is that the potential heat from the combustion of the char contained in the shale is not utilized. Also oil shale particles smaller than 12 millimetres (0.5 in) can not be processed in the Petrosix retort. These fines may account for 10 to 30 per cent of the crushed feed.

== See also ==
- Alberta Taciuk Process
- Fushun process
- Galoter process
- Kiviter process
- Lurgi-Ruhrgas process
- Paraná Basin
- Paraho process
- TOSCO II process
