= Fushun process =

Shale oil extraction technology

- Process type: Chemical
- Industrial sector(s): Chemical industry oil industry
- Feedstock: oil shale
- Product(s): shale oil
- Leading companies: Fushun Mining Group
- Main facilities: Fushun Shale Oil Plant

The Fushun process is an above-ground retorting technology for shale oil extraction. It is named after the main production site of Fushun, Liaoning province in northeastern China.

== History ==
The Fushun process was developed and utilized for the extraction of shale oil in China during the mid-1920s. The commercial-scale utilization of the process began in 1930 with the construction of "Refinery No. 1". After World War II, the shale oil production was ceased, but 100 Fushun-type oil shale retorts were restored in 1949. In 1950, total 266 retorts were in operation, each with the capacity of 100–200 tons of shale oil per day.

With the discovery of Daqing oil field in the 1960s, the shale oil production declined and Sinopec, an operator of shale oil production these times, shut down its oil shale operations in the beginning of the 1990s. At the same time, the Fushun Oil Shale Retorting Plant, using Fushun process technology, was established as a part of the Fushun Mining Group. It started production in 1992. In 2005, China became the largest shale oil producer in the world.

In 1985–86, Sinopec used the Fushun process for a test processing of Jordan's oil shale from the El Lajjun deposit. Although the process was technically viable, the cooperation was halted due to high operation costs.

== Technology ==
The Fushun process is classified as an internal combustion technology but also includes external gas heating. It uses a vertical cylindrical type shaft retort, with outside steel plate lined with inner fire bricks. The retort has height over 10 metres (33 ft) and its inner diameter is about 3 metres (9.8 ft). Raw oil shale particles with the size of 10 to 75 millimetres (0.4 to 3.0 in) are fed from the top of the retort. At the upper section of the retort oil shale is dried and heated by the ascending hot gases, which pass upward through the descending oil shale causing decomposition of the rock. The pyrolysis takes place at about 500 °C (930 °F). The produced oil vapor and gases exit from the top of the retort; hot gases and oil vapors move from the bottom to the top directly, and not diagonally like in Kiviter process. During the pyrolysis process, oil shale is decomposed to shale coke (char), which together with the ascending air-steam is burnt in the lower part of the retort to heat gases necessary for pyrolysis. These gases are recirculated; after leaving retort, they are cooled in a condensation system, where shale oil is condensed, and re-heated in a heating furnace about 500 °C (930 °F) to 700 °C (1,290 °F) before reinserting into the retort. The shale ash exits from a rotating water dish that acts as a seal and cooler at the bottom of the retort.

Retorts are operated in sets and have a heat carrier preparation unit and rotating water seals designed for the whole set instead of a single retort as in case of the Kiviter retort. Regenerative furnaces are located next to the retorts and they are operating in two cycles – the combustion cycle and the gas heating cycle. During the combustion cycle, a furnace is heated up to 1,000 °C (1,830 °F) by combustion gases. After the combustion cycle, retort gases from the condensation system is inserted into a furnace for their heating. By alternating furnaces, one furnace is always available for heating retort gas. Twenty retorts typically share one condensation system and a set of heating furnaces.

Advantages of the Fushun process include small investment and stable operation. The process is characterized by the high thermal efficiency, but due to the addition of air into the retort, the nitrogen dilutes the pyrolysis gas. In addition, the excess oxygen in retort burns out a part of produced shale oil, which reduce the shale oil yield. The oil yield of the Fushun retort accounts for about 65% of Fischer Assay. Disadvantage of this process is a high water consumption amounting to 6–7 barrels of water per barrel of produced shale-oil, and great quantities of waste shale. It is not suitable of ores with small size and oil content lower than 5%.

As the capacity of single retort is limited, Fushun process is suitable for small-scale retorting plants, and for processing lean oil shale with low gas yield.

== Commercial use ==
Fushun process is used only in China. The Fushun Mining Group operates the largest by capacity shale oil plant in the world (Fushun Shale Oil Plant) consisting of 180 Fushun retorts. Each retort processes about 4 tonnes of oil shale per hour.

== See also ==
- Energy in China
- Oil shale in China
- Kiviter process
- Alberta Taciuk Process
- Petrosix
- Galoter process
- TOSCO II process
- Paraho process
- Lurgi-Ruhrgas process
