= Kiviter process =

Shale oil extraction technology

- Process type: Chemical
- Industrial sector(s): Chemical industry oil industry
- Feedstock: oil shale
- Product(s): shale oil
- Leading companies: VKG Oil; Kiviõli Keemiatööstus
- Developer(s): VKG Oil

The Kiviter process is an above ground retorting technology for shale oil extraction. It is classified as an internal combustion technology and is used by the Estonian company Viru Keemia Grupp.

== History ==
The Kiviter process is based on the earlier vertical retort technology (Pintsch's generator). This technology underwent a long process of development. The early concept of central inlet of the heat carrier was later replaced by a concept of heat carrier gas cross flow in the retort.

The Kiviter technology has been used in Estonia since 1921, when first experimental Kiviter retorts were built. The first commercial scale oil plant based on the Kiviter technology was built in 1924.

From 1955 to 2003, Kiviter technology was used for oil shale processing also in Slantsy, Russia.

== Technology ==
The Kiviter process is classified as an internal combustion technology. The Kiviter retort is a vertical cylindrical vessel that heats coarse oil shale with recycled gases, steam, and air. To supply heat, gases (including produced oil shale gas) and carbonaceous spent residue are burnt within the retort. Raw oil shale is fed into the top of the retort, and is heated by the rising gases, which pass laterally through the descending oil shale causing decomposition of the rock. Pyrolysis is completed in the lower section of the retort, where the spent shale contacted with more hot gas, steam and air is heated to about 900 °C (1,650 °F) to gasify and burn the residual carbon (char). Shale oil vapors and evolving gases are delivered to a condensing system, where condensed shale oil is collected, while non-condensable gases are fed back to the retort. Recycled gas enters the bottom of the retort and cools the spent shale, which then leaves the retort through a water-sealed discharge system.

The Kiviter process uses large amounts of water, which is polluted during processing, and the solid waste residue contains water-soluble toxic substances that leach into the surrounding area.

== Commercial use ==
The Kiviter process is used by the Estonian Viru Keemia Grupp's subsidiary VKG Oil. The company operates several Kiviter retorts, the largest of them having a processing capacity of 40 tonnes per hour of oil shale feedstock.

== See also ==
- Oil shale in Estonia
- Alberta Taciuk Process
- Petrosix
- Galoter process
- TOSCO II process
- Fushun process
- Paraho process
