= Char (chemistry) =

Residue from burning

Char is the solid carbon-rich material that remains after light gases (e.g. coal gas), water, and tar have been driven out of a carbonaceous material during incomplete combustion, a process also known as carbonization, charring, devolatilization, or pyrolysis. Charcoal is char made from animal or plant sources, most often wood.

Further stages of efficient combustion (with or without char deposits) are known as gasification reactions, ending quickly when the reversible gas phase of the water gas shift reaction is reached.

== See also ==
- Biochar
- Charcoal
- Coke (fuel)
- Petroleum coke
- Shale oil extraction
- Spent shale
