= Oil shale gas =

Type of synthetic gas mixture

Oil shale gas (also: retort gas or retorting gas) is a synthetic non-condensable gas mixture (syngas) produced by oil shale thermal processing (pyrolysis). Although often referred to as shale gas, it differs from the natural gas produced from shale, also known as shale gas.

== Process ==
Oil shale gas is produced by retorting (pyrolysis) of oil shale. In the pyrolysis process, oil shale is heated until its kerogen decomposes into vapors of a petroleum-like condensable shale oil, non-condensable combustible oil shale gas, and spent shale—a solid residue. The process is the same as the shale oil extraction and oil shale gas usually occurs as a byproduct of shale oil production. The ratio of oil shale gas to shale oil depends on retorting temperature and as a rule, increases by the rise of temperature.

== Composition ==
There is no exact formula of oil shale gas. Compositions of oil shale gas depends on the retorted oil shale and exploited technology. Typical components of oil shale gas are usually methane, hydrogen, carbon monoxide, carbon dioxide, nitrogen, and different hydrocarbons like ethylene. It may also consist of hydrogen sulfide and other impurities.

== Use ==
Oil shale gas has served as a substitute for natural gas. In the 19th century and in the beginning of the 20th century oil shale gas was used as illuminating gas. In the 1920s, gas plants in Tallinn and Tartu produced oil shale gas as a town gas. Since 1948, Estonian-produced oil shale gas was used in Leningrad and the cities in North Estonia. For this purpose, 276 gas generators were operational in Kohtla-Järve until 1987.

As oil shale gas often occurs as a byproduct of shale oil extraction, depending on the processing technology, it may be used for heating the pyrolysis process.
