= Spent shale =

Solid residue from the shale oil extraction process

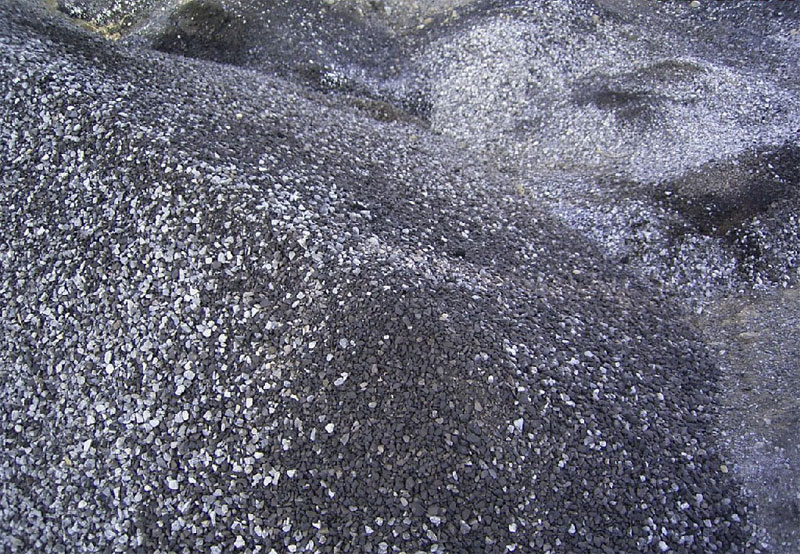
Mounds of spent shale

Spent shale or spent oil shale (also known as retorted shale) is a solid residue from the shale-oil extraction process of producing synthetic shale oil from oil shale. It consists of inorganic compounds (minerals) and remaining organic matter known as char—a carbonaceous residue formed from kerogen. Depending on the extraction process and the amount of remaining organic matter, spent shale may be classified as oil shale coke, semi-coke, or coke-ash residue, known also as oil shale ash. According to the European Union waste list, all these types of spent shale are classified as hazardous waste.

Oil shale coke is created by chamber ovens which were used for oil shale gas production. Vertical retorts create mainly semi-coke. Most solid heat-carrier processes create coke-ash residue, as the semi-coke created during the process is combusted for the process's energy needs.

Spent shale can be used as ingredients in cement or brick manufacture. In Jordan, usage of spent shale for the production of sodium carbonate, ammonium sulfate, and potassium sulfate has been studied.
