= Oil shale in Morocco =

Overview of the industry in Morocco

Oil shale in Morocco represents a significant potential resource. The ten known oil shale deposits in Morocco contain over 53.381 billion barrels (8.4869×10^{9} m^{3}) of shale oil. Although Moroccan oil shale has been studied since the 1930s and several pilot plants have extracted shale oil from the local formations, commercial extraction was not underway as of 2011.

== Reserves ==
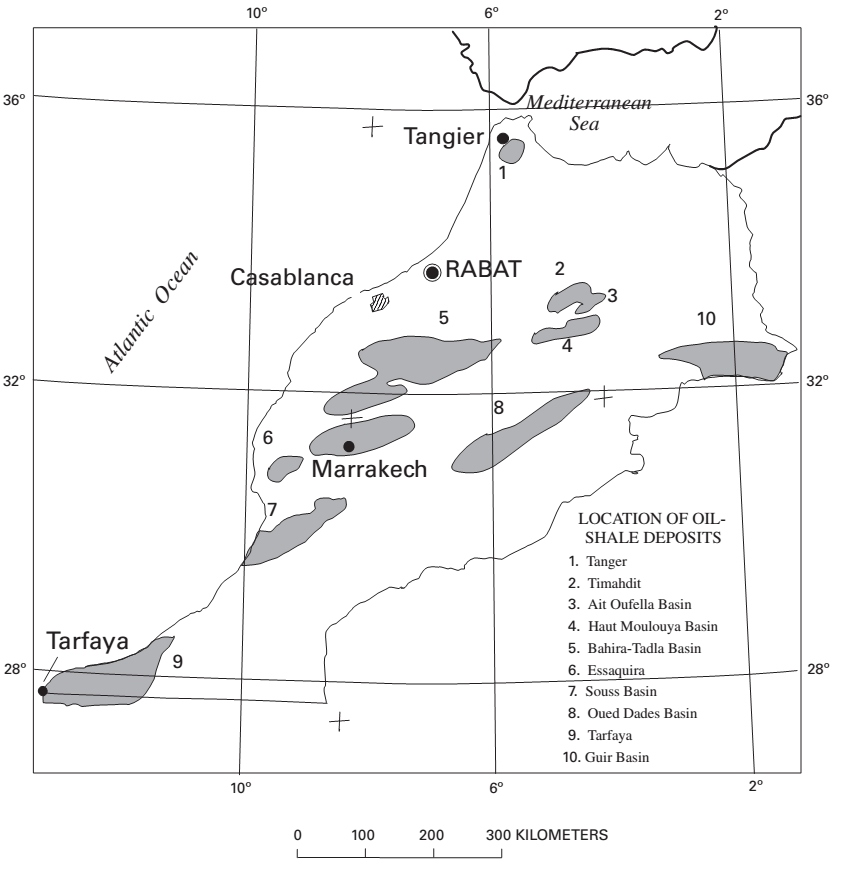
Oil-shale deposits in Morocco.

Morocco's total oil shale resources are estimated at 53.381 billion barrels (8.4869×10^{9} m^{3}) of shale oil. According to the United States Department of Energy, the oil shale deposits in Morocco constitute about 3.5% of the world's known oil shale resources. There are ten known oil shale deposits in Morocco. Most of the local deposits were laid down during the Upper Cretaceous era and are marinites. The most important of these are located at Tarfaya (in the south-westernmost part of Morocco) and Timahdit (in the Middle Atlas Mountains).

The largest known oil shale deposit in Morocco is located at Tarfaya. The deposit is estimated at 80 billion tons of oil shale, containing 22.7 billion barrels (3.61×10^{9} m^{3}) of shale oil. The deposit is divided into two flanks on each side of Tazrha sabkha. The volume of the west flank area is over 200 square kilometres (77 sq mi); the east flank area's volume is over 140 square kilometres (54 sq mi). The average thickness of the formation is 22 metres (72 ft). Its moisture content is about 20% and its sulfur content is about 2%. It yields about 62 litres (14 imp gal; 16 US gal) of shale oil per one ton of oil shale.

The second largest deposit is located at Timahdit, about 250 kilometres (160 mi) southeast of Rabat. Geologically, it comprises two basins: El koubbat and Angueur synclines. The oil shale formation is about 70 kilometres (43 mi) long and 4 to 10 kilometres (2.5 to 6.2 mi) wide. The volume of the El koubbat syncline formation is about 250 square kilometres (97 sq mi); the Angueur syncline area is about 100 square kilometres (39 sq mi). The deposit is estimated to consist of 42 billion tons of oil shale, containing 16.1 billion barrels (2.56×10^{9} m^{3}) of shale oil. The oil shale formation's thickness varies from 80 to 250 metres (260 to 820 ft). Its moisture content is 6–11% and sulfur content is about 2%. On average it yields 70 litres (15 imp gal; 18 US gal) of shale oil per one ton of oil shale. As the Timahdit deposit is located near Ifrane National Park and Haut-Atlas Oriental National Park, oil extraction is an environmentally sensitive issue.

The third largest deposit, consisting of 2,000 square kilometres (770 sq mi), is located near Tanger. The deposit is estimated to contain 2 billion barrels (320×10^{6} m^{3}) of shale oil. The oil shale formation's maximum thickness is 8 metres (26 ft). It yields 30–85 litres (6.6–18.7 imp gal; 7.9–22.5 US gal) of shale oil per one ton of oil shale.

== History ==
The Moroccan oil shale industry began with research during the 1930s. Tanger was the first discovered oil shale deposit. An 80-tonne-per-day pilot plant extracted shale oil from the formation between 1939 and 1945. The pilot plant was operated by Société des Schistes Bitumineux de Tanger.

The Timahdit and Tarfaya deposits were discovered during the 1960s. These deposits were researched and tested during the 1970s and 1980s. Over 2,200 tons of Timahdit and Tarfaya oil shales were processed in pilot plants in Europe, the United States, Canada, and Japan. Following these tests, in 1984–1986 the Moroccan Office of Hydrocarbons and Mining (ONHYM) developed and tested a shale oil extraction process called T^{3}. T^{3} was a surface retorting process, which used two semi-continuous identical retorts. While one retort operated, another retorted cooled after retorting process. The resulting oil yield was 70% of that given by a Fischer Assay, the benchmark test of shale oil extraction potential. Approximately 400 tons of shale oil were produced at Timahdit.

In 1981–1986, Royal Dutch Shell tested the Tarfaya deposit. Shell mined the shale using open pits and extracted its oil in an above-ground retort.

== Recent activities ==
A new strategy and legal framework for oil shale activities was adopted in 2005. Since 2008, Petrobras and Total S.A. have been evaluating the Timahdit deposit. In May 2009, San Leon Energy signed a three-year agreement with ONHYM for development of the Tarfaya deposit. San Leon Energy concluded an exclusive agreement with Mountain West Energy to use the Mountain West Energy-patented In-Situ Vapor Extraction technology for a three-year pilot project at Tarfaya. In August 2012, San Leon commissioned Enefit Outotec Technology, a joint venture of Eesti Energia and Outotec, to study a feasibility of an Enefit 280 production plant.

Another agreement on Tarfaya deposit was signed with Xtract Energy (Oil Shale) Morocco SA, a joint venture of Global Oil Shale Group Limited (70%) and Alraed Limited Investment Holding Company which is controlled by Bandar bin Mohammed bin Abdulrahman al-Saud. Eesti Energia had signed an agreement on evaluation of the Aghbala and Errachidia deposits but found these deposits not suitable for commercial production.
