= San Leon Energy =

San Leon Energy plc
- Company type: Public
- Traded as: AIM: SLE
- Industry: Oil and gas industry
- Founded: 1995
- Headquarters: Dublin, Ireland
- Key people: Oisin Fanning, Executive Chairman; Paul Sullivan, Managing Director; John Buggenhagen, Exploration Director; Jeremy Boak, Non-executive Director; Daniel Martin, Non-executive Director; Ray King, Company Secretary
- Products: Crude oil Natural gas
- Revenue: ▲€592,047 (2010)
- Operating income: ▼€2,569,950 (2010) ▼€5,077,322 (2009)
- Net income: ▼€3,976,375 (2010) ▼€5,520,726 (2009)
- Total assets: ▲€148,717,094 (2010) ▲€39,239,472 (2009)
- Total equity: ▲€121,226,592 (2010) ▲€33,033,389 (2009)
- Website: www.sanleonenergy.com

San Leon Energy plc (LSE: SLE) is an independent oil and gas exploration company and is Europe's leading shale gas company by acreage. San Leon has built up a portfolio of assets located in Poland, Morocco, Western Sahara, Albania, Ireland, Spain and Italy. The company's portfolio across these geographies is made up of both conventional exploration and shale (Poland Baltic Basin, Morocco and Spain) assets.

The company's corporate headquarters is in Dublin, Ireland while operational offices are located in London and Warsaw.

== History ==
Incorporated in 1995 as an oil and gas exploration company, San Leon primarily acted as an investment vehicle until 2007 when it acquired its first oil shale exploration assets in Morocco.

In September 2008, the company listed on the London Stock Exchange's AIM before embarking on a strategic initiative to develop a portfolio of licences and lease interests through subsidiary operations in several countries.

In 2009, San Leon signed a relationship with PGS which covers a $50m facility for seismic services and will cover 50% of any seismic data collection that San Leon needs to undertake. In May 2009, Gold Point Energy was acquired. In 2010, a deal was signed with Talisman Energy, which saw Talisman agree to pay 60% of the costs incurred in San Leon's two Baltic Basin concessions. Also in 2010, San Leon acquired Island Oil & Gas. In 2011, it acquired Realm Energy.

In May 2009, San Leon signed a three-year agreement with the Moroccan Office of Hydrocarbons and Mining for development of the Tarfaya oil shale deposit. San Leon Energy concluded an exclusive agreement with Mountain West Energy to use the Mountain West Energy-patented In-Situ Vapor Extraction technology for a three-year pilot project at Tarfaya. In August 2012, San Leon commissioned Enefit Outotec Technology, a joint venture of Eesti Energia and Outotec, to study a feasibility of an Enefit 280 production plant.

In July 2015, the company announced it had entered into a controversial agreement with the Moroccan government to drill onshore occupied Western Sahara. The UN stated in 2002, that any further exploration in Western Sahara would be in violation of international law, if it was not in accordance with the wishes of the people of the territory. The message about the agreement created massive protests, and it is feared that a possible oil find will complicate the work of a peaceful resolution to the conflict.
