= Oil shale industry =

Resource extraction industry

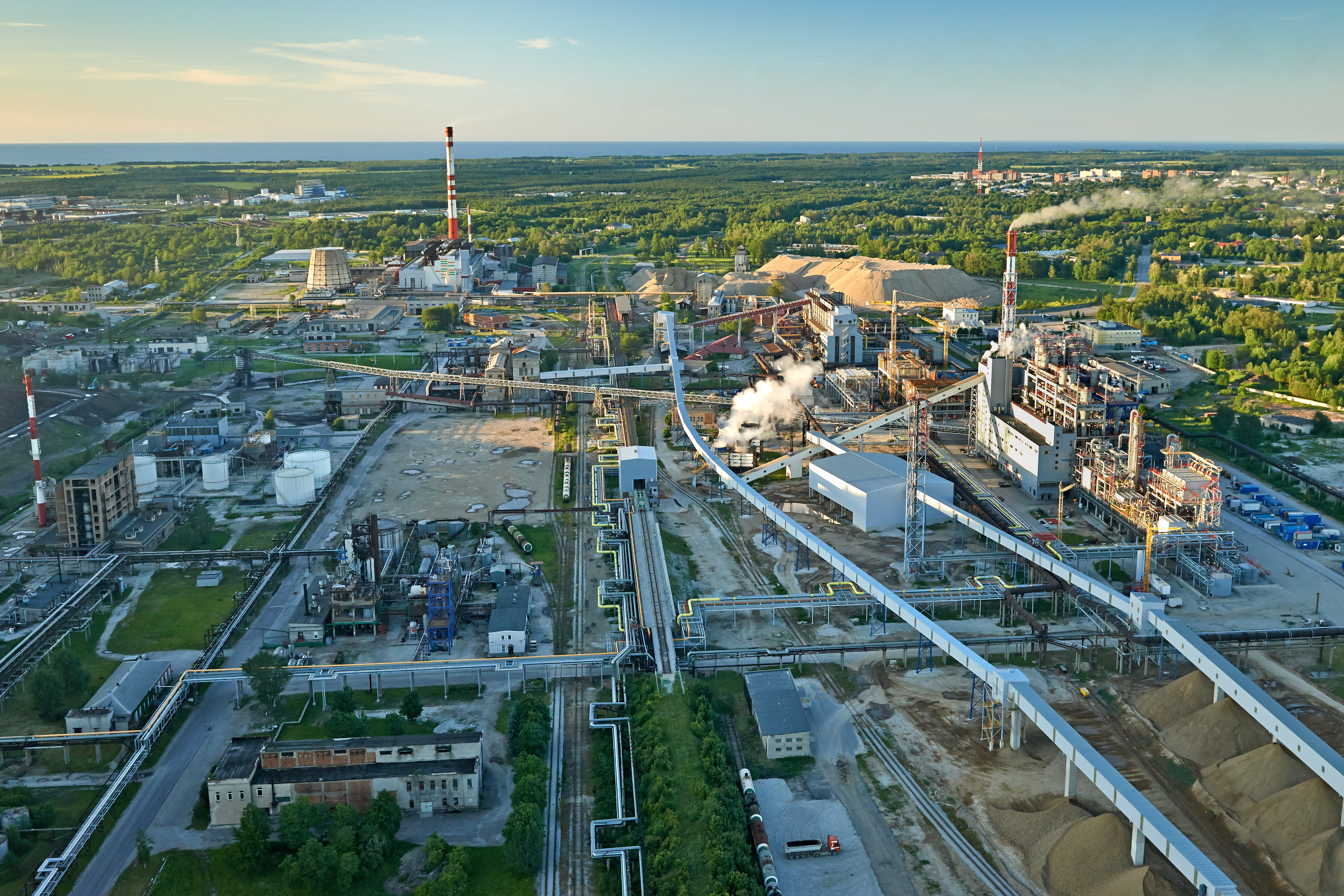
VKG Energia in Estonia.

The oil shale industry is an industry of mining and processing of oil shale—a fine-grained sedimentary rock, containing significant amounts of kerogen (a solid mixture of organic chemical compounds), from which liquid hydrocarbons can be manufactured. The industry has developed in Brazil, China, Estonia and to some extent in Germany and Russia. Several other countries are currently conducting research on their oil shale reserves and production methods to improve efficiency and recovery. Estonia accounted for about 70% of the world's oil shale production in a study published in 2005.

Oil shale has been used for industrial purposes since the early 17th century, when it was mined for its minerals. Since the late 19th century, shale oil has also been used for its oil content and as a low grade fuel for power generation. However, barring countries having significant oil shale deposits, its use for power generation is not particularly widespread. Similarly, oil shale is a source for production of synthetic crude oil and it is seen as a solution towards increasing domestic production of oil in countries that are reliant on imports.

== History ==
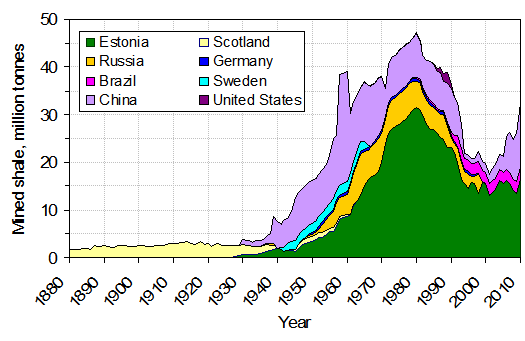
Production of oil shale in millions of metric tons, from 1880 to 2010. Source: Pierre Allix, Alan K. Burnham.

Oil shale has been used since ancient times. Modern industrial oil shale mining began in 1837 at the Autun mines in France, followed by Britain, Germany and several other countries. The oil shale industry started growing just before World War I because of the mass production of automobiles and trucks and the supposed shortage of gasoline for transportation needs. In 1924, the Tallinn Power Plant was the first power plant in the world to switch to oil shale firing.

Following the end of World War II, the oil shale industry declined due to the discovery of large supplies of easily accessible and cheaper crude oil. Oil shale production however, continued to grow in Estonia, Russia and China.

Following the 1973 oil crisis, the oil shale industry was restarted in several countries, but in the 1980s, when oil prices fell, many industries faced closure. The global oil shale industry has grown again from the mid-1990s. In 2003, the oil shale development program was initiated in the United States, and in 2005, the commercial leasing program for oil shale and tar sands was introduced.

As of May 2007, Estonia is actively engaged in exploitation of oil shale on a significant scale and accounts for 70% of the world's processed oil shale. Estonia is unique in that its oil shale deposit account for just 17% of total deposits in European Union but it generates 90% of its power from oil shale. Oil shale industry in Estonia employs 7,500 people, which is about 1% of national employment, accounting for 4% of its gross domestic product.

== Mining ==
Oil shale is mined either by traditional underground mining or surface mining techniques. There are several mining methods available, but the common aim of all these methods is to fragment the oil shale deposits in order to enable the transport of shale fragments to a power plant or retorting facility. The main methods of surface mining are open pit mining and strip mining. An important method of sub-surface mining is the room-and-pillar method. In this method, the material is extracted across a horizontal plane while leaving "pillars" of untouched material to support the roof. These pillars reduce the likelihood of a collapse. Oil shale can also be obtained as a by-product of coal mining.

The largest oil shale mine in the world is the Estonia Mine, operated by Enefit Kaevandused. In 2005, Estonia mined 14.8 million tonnes of oil shale. During the same period, mining permits were issued for almost 24 million tonnes, with applications being received for mining an additional 26 million tonnes. In 2008, the Estonian Parliament approved the "National Development Plan for the Use of Oil Shale 2008-2015", which limits the annual extraction of oil shale to 20 million tonnes.

== Power generation ==
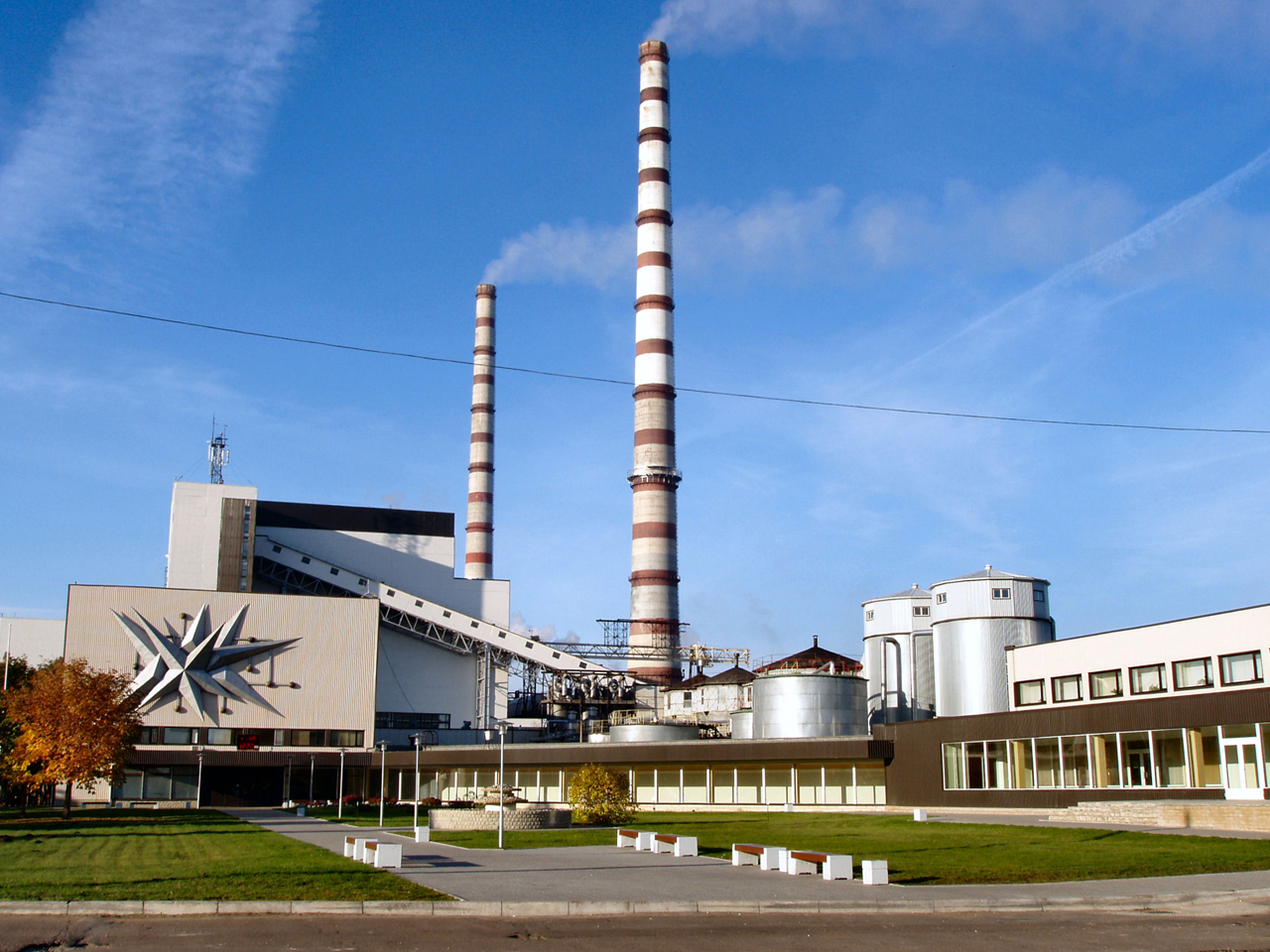
Oil-shale-fired Eesti Power Plant in Narva, Estonia.

Oil shale can be used as a fuel in thermal power plants, wherein oil shale is burnt like coal to drive the steam turbines. As of 2012, there are oil shale-fired power plants in Estonia with a generating capacity of 2,967 megawatts (MW), China, and Germany. Also Israel, Romania and Russia have run oil shale-fired power plants, but have shut them down or switched to other fuels like natural gas. Jordan and Egypt have announced their plans to construct oil shale-fired power plants, while Canada and Turkey plan to burn oil shale at the power plants along with coal.

Thermal power plants which use oil shale as a fuel mostly employ two types of combustion methods. The traditional method is Pulverized combustion (PC) which is used in the older units of oil shale-fired power plants in Estonia, while the more advanced method is Fluidized bed combustion (FBC), which is used in the Holcim cement factory in Dotternhausen, Germany, and was used in the Mishor Rotem power plant in Israel. The main FBC technologies are Bubbling fluidized bed combustion (BFBC) and Circulating fluidized bed combustion (CFBC).

There are more than 60 power plants around the world, which are using CFBC technology for combustion of coal and lignite, but only two new units at Narva Power Plants in Estonia, and one at Huadian Power Plant in China use CFBC technology for combustion of oil shale. The most advanced and efficient oil shale combustion technology is Pressurized fluidized-bed combustion (PFBC). However, this technology is still premature and is in its nascent stage.

== Oil extraction ==
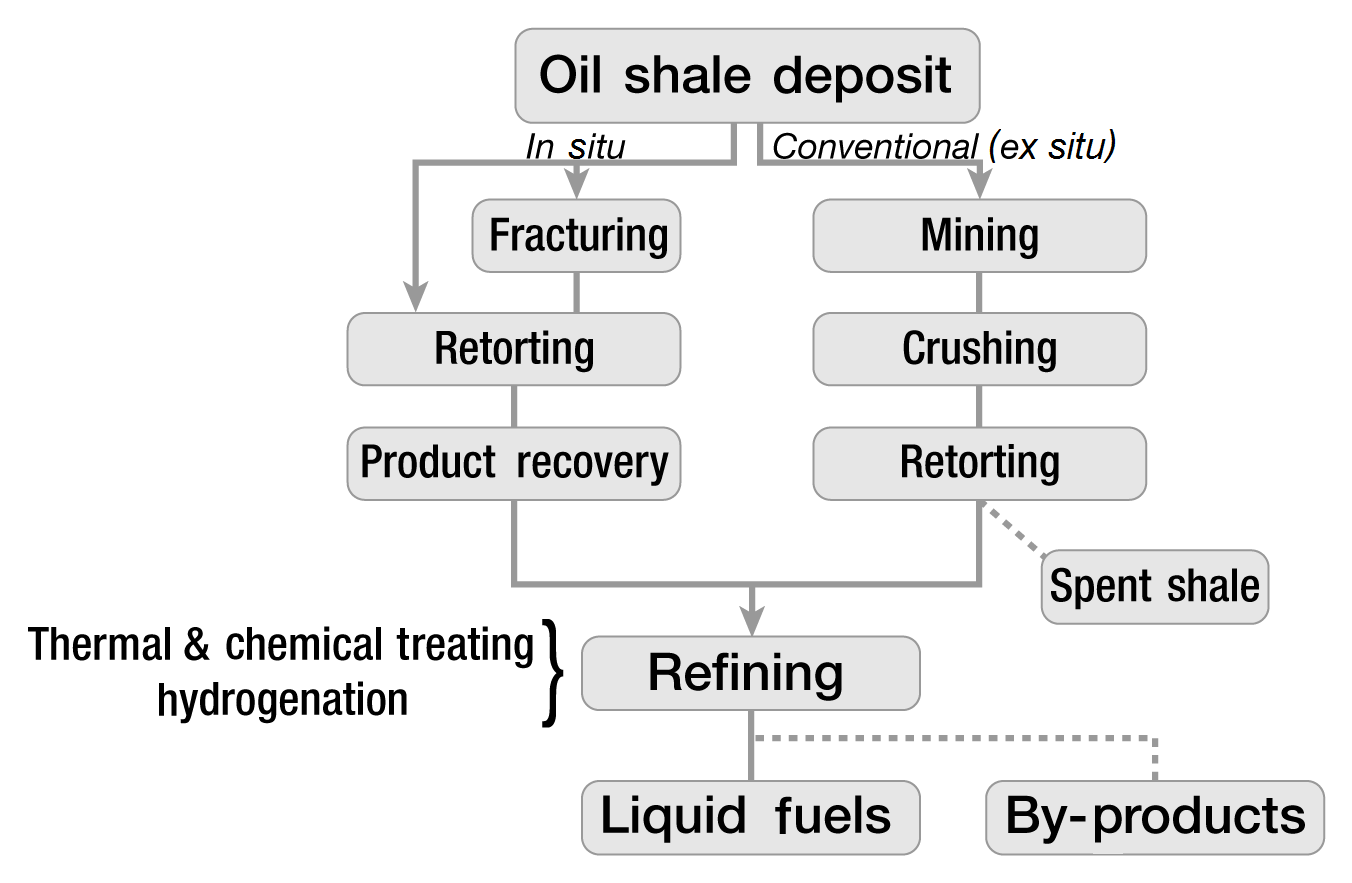
Overview of shale oil extraction

The major shale oil producers are China and Estonia, with Brazil a distant third, while Australia, USA, Canada and Jordan have planned to set up or restart shale oil production. According to the World Energy Council, in 2008 the total production of shale oil from oil shale was 930,000 tonnes, equal to 17,700 barrels per day (2,810 m^{3}/d), of which China produced 375,000 tonnes, Estonia 355,000 tonnes, and Brazil 200 tonnes. In comparison, production of the conventional oil and natural gas liquids in 2008 amounted 3.95 billion tonnes or 82.12 million barrels per day (13.056×10^{6} m^{3}/d).

Although there are several oil shale retorting technologies, only four technologies are currently in commercial use. These are Kiviter, Galoter, Fushun, and Petrosix. The two main methods of extracting oil from shale are ex-situ and in-situ. In ex-situ method, the oil shale is mined and transported to the retort facility in order to extract the oil. The in-situ method converts the kerogen while it is still in the form of an oil shale deposit, and then extracts it via a well, where it rises up as normal petroleum.

== Other industrial uses ==
Oil shale is used for cement production by Kunda Nordic Cement in Estonia, by Holcim in Germany, and by Fushun cement factory in China. Oil shale can also be used for production of different chemical products, construction materials, and pharmaceutical products, e.g. ammonium bituminosulfonate. However, use of oil shale for production of these products is still very rare and in experimental stages only.

Some oil shales are suitable source for sulfur, ammonia, alumina, soda ash, and nahcolite which occur as shale oil extraction byproducts. Some oil shales can also be used for uranium and other rare chemical element production. During 1946–1952, a marine variety of Dictyonema shale was used for uranium production in Sillamäe, Estonia, and during 1950–1989 alum shale was used in Sweden for the same purpose. Oil shale gas can also be used as a substitute for natural gas. After World War II, Estonian-produced oil shale gas was used in Leningrad and the cities in North Estonia. However, at the current price level of natural gas, this is not economically feasible.

== Economics ==
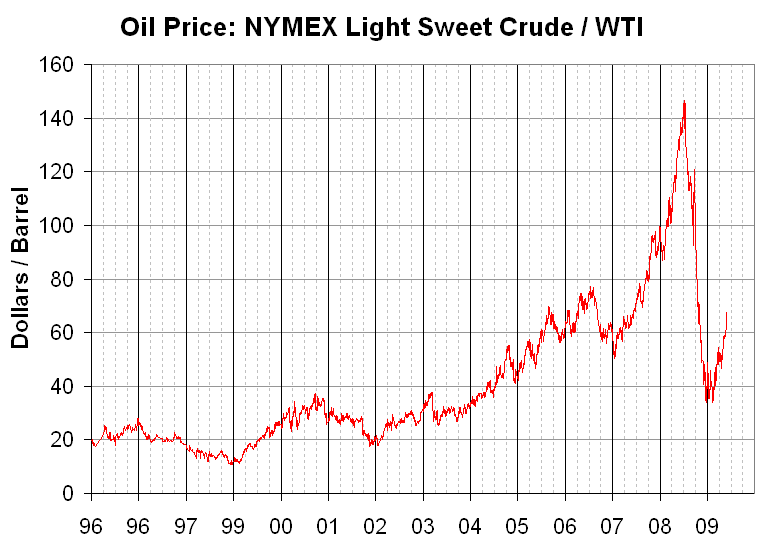
NYMEX light-sweet crude oil prices 1996–2009 (not adjusted for inflation)

The amount of economically recoverable oil shale is unknown. The various attempts to develop oil shale deposits have succeeded only when the cost of shale-oil production in a given region comes in below the price of crude oil or its other substitutes. According to a survey conducted by the RAND Corporation, the cost of producing a barrel of shale oil at a hypothetical surface retorting complex in the United States (comprising a mine, retorting plant, upgrading plant, supporting utilities, and spent shale reclamation), would range between US$70–95 ($440–600/m^{3}), adjusted to 2005 values. Assuming a gradual increase in output after the start of commercial production, the analysis projects a gradual reduction in processing costs to $30–40 per barrel ($190–250/m^{3}) after achieving the milestone of 1 billion barrels (160×10^{6} m^{3}). Royal Dutch Shell has announced that its Shell ICP technology would realize a profit when crude oil prices are higher than $30 per barrel ($190/m^{3}), while some technologies at full-scale production assert profitability at oil prices even lower than $20 per barrel ($130/m^{3}).

To increase the efficiency of oil shale retorting and by this the viability of the shale oil production, researchers have proposed and tested several co-pyrolysis processes, in which other materials such as biomass, peat, waste bitumen, or rubber and plastic wastes are retorted along with the oil shale. Some modified technologies propose combining a fluidized bed retort with a circulated fluidized bed furnace for burning the by-products of pyrolysis (char and oil shale gas) and thereby improving oil yield, increasing throughput, and decreasing retorting time.

In a 1972 publication by the journal Pétrole Informations (ISSN 0755-561X), shale oil production was unfavorably compared to the coal liquefaction. The article stated that coal liquefaction was less expensive, generated more oil, and created fewer environmental impacts than oil shale extraction. It cited a conversion ratio of 650 liters (170 U.S. gal; 140 imp gal) of oil per one tonne of coal, as against 150 liters (40 U.S. gal; 33 imp gal) of shale oil per one tonne of oil shale.

A critical measure of the viability of oil shale as an energy source lies in the ratio of the energy produced by the shale to the energy used in its mining and processing, a ratio known as "Energy Returned on Energy Invested" (EROEI). A 1984 study estimated the EROEI of the various known oil-shale deposits as varying between 0.7–13.3 although known oil-shale extraction development projects assert an EROEI between 3 and 10. According to the World Energy Outlook 2010, the EROEI of ex-situ processing is typically 4 to 5 while of in-situ processing it may be even as low as 2. However, according to the IEA most of used energy can be provided by burning the spent shale or oil-shale gas.

The water needed in the oil shale retorting process offers an additional economic consideration: this may pose a problem in areas with water scarcity.

== Environmental considerations ==
Mining oil shale involves a number of environmental impacts, more pronounced in surface mining than in underground mining. These include acid drainage induced by the sudden rapid exposure and subsequent oxidation of formerly buried materials, the introduction of metals including mercury into surface-water and groundwater, increased erosion, sulfur-gas emissions, and air pollution caused by the production of particulates during processing, transport, and support activities. In 2002, about 97% of air pollution, 86% of total waste and 23% of water pollution in Estonia came from the power industry, which uses oil shale as the main resource for its power production.

Oil-shale extraction can damage the biological and recreational value of land and the ecosystem in the mining area. Combustion and thermal processing generate waste material. In addition, the atmospheric emissions from oil shale processing and combustion include carbon dioxide, a greenhouse gas. Environmentalists oppose production and usage of oil shale, as it creates even more greenhouse gases than conventional fossil fuels. Experimental in situ conversion processes and carbon capture and storage technologies may reduce some of these concerns in the future, but at the same time they may cause other problems, including groundwater pollution. Among the water contaminants commonly associated with oil shale processing are oxygen and nitrogen heterocyclic hydrocarbons. Commonly detected examples include quinoline derivatives, pyridine, and various alkyl homologues of pyridine (picoline, lutidine).

Water concerns are sensitive issues in arid regions, such as the western US and Israel's Negev Desert, where plans exist to expand oil-shale extraction despite a water shortage. Depending on technology, above-ground retorting uses between one and five barrels of water per barrel of produced shale-oil. A 2008 programmatic environmental impact statement issued by the US Bureau of Land Management stated that surface mining and retort operations produce 2 to 10 U.S. gallons (7.6 to 37.9 L; 1.7 to 8.3 imp gal) of waste water per 1 short ton (0.91 t) of processed oil shale. In situ processing, according to one estimate, uses about one-tenth as much water.

Environmental activists, including members of Greenpeace, have organized strong protests against the oil shale industry. In one result, Queensland Energy Resources put the proposed Stuart Oil Shale Project in Australia on hold in 2004.

== See also ==
- Oil shale reserves
