= OSEC =

OSEC can stand for:

- Occupy the SEC
- Former name of Enefit American Oil (former name: Oil Shale Exploration Company - OSEC)
- Open Science European Conference
- Office of the Secretary of US departments or commissions
- OSec (formerly OccamSec), a New York-based computer security company
- On-Site Hypochlorite Generation Systems, a registered trademark of Xylem Inc.
- Office Suisse d’Expansion Commerciale (Switzerland Global Enterprise)
