= Sangruntau oil shale deposit =

The Sangruntau oil shale deposit is an oil-shale deposit in Navoi Region, Uzbekistan. The reserves are estimated to reach up to 47 billion metric tons.

== History ==
In 2010, Uzbekneftegaz started a process to develop the deposit. The first stage of the plan was to build two Galoter-type shale oil extraction plants designed by Russian AtomEnergoProekt. The first plant would have the capacity to process 8 million tons of oil shale and produce one million tons of oil per year. The second stage was to increase the number of plants to eight. The residual heat of the process and produces oil-shale gas would be used for electricity production at the 120-MW facility. However, in December 2015 Uzbekneftegaz announced that the project was postponed.

The deposit was to be developed by Uzbekneftegaz in cooperation with Japan Oil, Gas and Metals National Corporation and a number of Korean companies. This was to be followed by a joint venture of Uzbekneftegaz, JGC Corporation and Technopian Corporation to extract metals from the oil shale.
