= Narva Oil Plant =

Oil facility in Narva, Estonia

360° view of the Enefit 280 shale oil plant

Narva Oil Plant (Estonian: Narva Õlitehas) is a commercial scale shale oil retorting facility located in Auvere near Narva, Estonia. The plant produces shale oil from oil shale by using Galoter/Eneffit technology. The facility belongs to Enefit Energiatootmine, a subsidiary of Eesti Energia.

== History ==
The original oil shale retorting plant (UTT-3000 refinery) was built in the late 1970s next to the Eesti Power Plant to provide shale oil as a start-up fuel for the power plants. The plant which is using Galoter technology was commissioned in 1980. In 2009, Eesti Energia started construction of a new Enefit 280 shale oil plant adjacent to the existing plant. The new plant was commissioned in 2012 and first oil was produced in the new plant on 20 December 2012.

The oil plant has been operated as a part of the Narva Power Plants. In 2007, the oil plant was separated from the power plants and a separate subsidiary of Eesti Energia, Eesti Energia Narva Õlitehas AS (later: Eesti Energia Õlitööstus AS) was established. In 2016, the oil plant was re-merged with the power plants to create a consolidated generation company Enefit Energiatootmine AS.

== Description ==
The old retorting plant consists of two modified UTT-3000 type solid heat carrier retorts, known as Enefit 140 retorts. Both retorts processing 125 tonnes of oil shale per hour resulting combined up to 240,000 tonnes of shale oil a year. The new retorting plant (Enefit 280) has processing capacity of 2.26 million tonnes of oil shale per year producing 256,000 tonnes of shale oil and 75 million cubic meters of oil shale gas per year. It has an integrated 35 MW steam-driven turbine to convert residual heat to electricity used for the plant own needs. Main products are fuel grade shale oil, raw material for bitumen and antiseptics. The designed annual capacity of the plant is 220,000 tons of shale oil and 60 million cubic meters of retort gas.

== See also ==
- Energy in Estonia
