= Enefit American Oil =

Company based in USA, subsidiary of Eesti Energia

- Type: Private, subsidiary of Eesti Energia
- Industry: Oil shale industry
- Founded: 2005
- Headquarters: Salt Lake City, Utah, United States
- Key people: Rikki Hrenko-Browning (CEO)
- Parent: Eesti Energia
- Website: www.enefitutah.com

Enefit American Oil (former name: Oil Shale Exploration Company - OSEC) is a Utah-based oil shale exploration and development company. It has been involved in the development of oil shale since 2005. Since 2011 it is a subsidiary of Eesti Energia, internationally known as Enefit. In January 2024 Eesti Energia announced that it will cease all its operations in the United States.

== History ==
OSEC was formed in 2005 as a limited liability company by following companies:

- L&R Energy, Inc.
- Twin Pines Coal Company
- Shale Investments, LLC

In 2008, OSEC concluded a contract with Brazilian oil company Petrobras and Japanese investment and trading company Mitsui according to which Petrobras and Misui had a right to acquire 10%-20% interests each in an oil shale joint venture with OSEC.

In March 2011, Estonian energy company Eesti Energia acquired 100% of OSEC's shares. This transaction was criticized by some Estonian oil shale scientists who expressed doubts if the Eesti Energia's Enefit extraction technology is suitable Utah oil shale due to the high percentage of nitrous compounds in it.

In January 2024 Eesti Energia announced that it will cease all operations in the United States and will liquidate four of its U.S. subsidiaries.

== Operations ==
Enefit American Oil owns or leases 30,274 acres (122.51 km^{2}) of oil shale property in the Uintah Basin in Utah, containing an estimated 2.6 billion barrels (410×10^{6} m^{3}) of recoverable shale oil. It also leases from the United States Bureau of Land Management the abandoned White River Oil Shale Mine 45 miles (72 km) southeast of Vernal, Utah. The White River Mine was developed by the White River Shale Corporation in the early 1980s. In 1986, after termination of operations, the mine and surface facilities were turned over to the Bureau of Land Management.

Enefit is proposing to develop a greenfield oil shale mining and mineral processing facility on 13,441 acres (5,439 ha) of private lands in the Uinta Basin of eastern Utah (the "South Project"). As contemplated, the South Project will entail surface mining oil shale from approximately 7,000 acres (2,800 ha), producing 50,000 barrels per day (7,900 m^{3}/d) of shale oil, and over 500 million barrels (79×10^{6} m^{3}) over the life of the project. The company planned to begin commercial production in mid 2020s.

== Technology ==
Originally OSEC planned to use the Alberta Taciuk Process (ATP). To use the ATP retort technology, OSEC entered into a license agreement with AECOM, then owner of the ATP proprietary information. However, on 9 June 2008, OSEC announced it had signed an agreement with Petrobras and Mitsui according to which Petrobras agreed to undertake a technical, economic and environmental commercial feasibility study of Petrosix shale oil extraction technology for oil shale owned or leased by OSEC in Utah. Few results of the study were disclosed. After acquiring 100% of OSEC shares in March 2011, Eesti Energia announced it would conduct a new commercial study using its Enefit Process. The company has produced oil from Utah oil shale in its test facilities in Germany using the Enefit technology and is optimizing and is exploring a variety of alternatives and modifications to the process of shale oil production.

== Predevelopment ==
In 2012, Enefit American Oil submitted an application to the Bureau of Land Management for a utility Right of Way to serve Enefit South. While the site is privately owned, utilities to serve it must cross BLM land, which triggered an Environmental Impact Statement. In preparation for submitting permit applications, EAO completed 1.5 years of ambient air quality baseline data collection in 2013. This was conducted at an Environmental Protection Agency-approved air monitoring station on the project site in the Rabbit Mountain area in southern Uintah Basin. Since then, the Utah State University's Uintah Basin Campus has continued collection of meteorological information for use in a long-term, multi-agency study of the Basin's air quality.

Environmental groups have raised concerns about the broader impact of the shale oil project, however, as the kerogen oil it produces is a highly carbon-polluting fuel. The 1.2 billion barrels of oil expected from the project have been estimated to produce lifecycle greenhouse gas emissions of up to 450 million tons of carbon dioxide equivalent, about the same as 100 coal-fired power plants emit in a year.

The limited water needed for the project will come from an existing surface water right and be piped from the Green River. However, we are drilling or rehabilitating a series of 23 groundwater-monitoring wells on the project site to develop a model that will confirm underground water quality and movement. We have also installed six surface water-monitoring sites along Evacuation Creek, an intermittent stream that runs through part of the project site. Results of sampling from these wells indicate excess (above-standard) levels of phosphorus, aluminum, arsenic, cadmium, lead, phenol, and selenium, according to the EPA's Draft Environmental Impact Statement. Fieldwork conducted in 2013 confirmed data from previous years that there are no greater sage grouse or leks (breeding areas) located on the Enefit South private property or the BLM utility corridor. The U.S. government is evaluating these birds for potential listing as threatened under the Endangered Species Act, with a decision planned for 2015.

Enefit American Oil voluntarily worked with federal, state and local agencies to provide acreage for Penstemon Conservation Areas as part of a Penstemon Conservation Agreement designed to preserve habitat and support surveys and research for White River and Graham's penstemon (beardtongue). Along with other energy companies and working with the School Institutional Trusts Lands Association, its representatives required that certain areas remain "off limits" to those conservation areas before agreeing to participate. While the company claims that the two species are similar, in fact they are nothing alike. (In 1984 for example, Penstemon expert Noel Holmgren placed P. grahamii in Sect. 5 Cristati and P. scariosus var. albifluvis in Sect. 10 Glabri.) While both species grow on the Green River Formation, they each have a very narrow and limited distribution, and are not sympatric. In a controversial decision, on August 5, 2014, the Fish and Wildlife Service withdrew its proposal to list two plant species in eastern Utah and western Colorado as threatened and instead signed onto the 15-year federal-state-local Conservation Agreement designed to preserve habitat and support surveys and research for the plants. This agreement was not funded and was based on a term dictated not by science but rather by SITLA, documented by SITLA's own internal minutes and correspondence with the Fish & Wildlife Service; this agreement is currently being challenged

Cultural surveyors found and documented several artifacts from the historic mining days of the late 1800s, and paleontological researchers found animal, plant and insect fossils dating back several million years. EAO is working with the Utah Fieldhouse of Natural History in Vernal to share these findings, so everyone can learn about the history of the area.

According to an economic impact study, Enefit expects that by the mid-2050s more than 100,000 new jobs will have been added to the state's workforce from direct, indirect and induced spending to build and operate the Utah Project. Direct workforce is expected to number between 1,500 and 2,000 employees during this period; additional employment comes from contractors supplying the project and from "induced" jobs created to serve a larger community. Over the course of 30 years, that will result in about US$4 billion in wages and labor income and more than $8 billion in total contributions to Utah's gross domestic product.

According to an opinion survey conducted for Enefit American Oil in September and October 2013, most Utahns believe that energy production is very important to the local economy. When asked specifically if the respondents would support Enefit's Utah Project, 59% of Utahns statewide and 84% of those in the Uintah Basin said yes. Achieving energy independence and providing jobs and other economic benefits were cited as the main reasons for people's support. Research was conducted among 605 people throughout Utah to mirror the state's population and demographic distribution. Another 210 people – residents of Utah's Uintah Basin and nearby towns in western Colorado's Rio Blanco and Moffat counties – were contacted to determine if there are any major differences between opinions statewide and those in the area of greatest impact and benefit of Enefit's proposed project.
