= Enefit Kaevandused =

Company based in Estonia

Enefit Kaevandused AS
- Type: subsidiary of Eesti Energia
- Industry: Mining
- Founded: 1945
- Defunct: 2021
- Fate: merged into Enefit Power
- Headquarters: Jõhvi, Estonia
- Area served: North–east Estonia
- Key people: Andres Vainola (CEO)
- Products: Oil shale
- Number of employees: 3,150 (2009)
- Parent: Eesti Energia
- Website: www.energia.ee/et/organisatsioon/kaevandused

Enefit Kaevandused (former names: Eesti Põlevkivi and Eesti Energia Kaevandused) was a mining company located in Jõhvi, Estonia. It was a subsidiary of Eesti Energia, an Estonian state-owned energy company. The core activity of Enefit Kaevandused was oil-shale mining. The produced oil shale was mainly used for shale oil production and to fuel oil shale-fired power stations in the north–east of Estonia. As of 2009, the company had 3,150 employees. The last chief executive officer was Andres Vainola. The company produced more than 17 million tons of oil shale in 2013.

== History ==
Enefit Kaevandused were established in June 1945 as Eesti Põlevkivi, also known by its name in Russian Estonslanets. It was created by merging Kukruse and Käva II mines. In 1946, it took over Viivikonna mine.

New mines were opened in Ahtme (1948), Jõhvi (No. 2, 1949), Sompa (1949), Tammiku (1951), and in the area between Käva and Sompa (No. 4, 1953). The Ubja mine was given to Eesti Põlevkivi in 1957, but it was closed in 1959. After construction of large oil shale-fired power stations in Narva, demand for oil shale increased and consequently Eesti Põlevkivi opened the underground mines Viru (1965) and Estonia (1972) along with the open-pit mines Sirgala (1963), Narva (1970) and Oktoobri (1974; later named Aidu). Correspondingly, several exhausted smaller mines like Kukruse (1967), Käva (1972), No. 2 (1973), No. 4 (1975), and Kiviõli (1987) were closed. The Estonia Mine became the largest oil shale mine in the world. At the end of 1988, a fire broke out in the Estonia Mine. The largest underground fire in Estonia, it continued for 81 days and caused serious pollution of ground and surface waters.

In 1998, Eesti Põlevkivi and Dynamit Nobel opened an explosives manufacturing plant in Estonia. After Dynamit Nobel sold its explosives business to Orica, the later became the main shareholder in the plant.

Due to a decrease in demand, the Tammiku and Sompa mines closed in 1999 and those at Kohtla and Ahtme closed in 2001. In 2000, the open-pit mines at Viivikonna, Sirgala and Narva were merged into the single Narva open-pit mine. The exhausted Aidu open-pit mine was closed in 2012, followed a year later by the Viru underground mine.

In 1999, Government of Estonia handed 51% of the shares of Eesti Põlevkivi to Narva Elektrijaamad. In 2003, Government transferred the remaining 49% stake in Eesti Põlevkivi to Eesti Energia. Also Narva Elektrijaamad-owned 51% stake was transferred to Eesti Energia and Eesti Põlevkivi became a fully owned subsidiary of Eesti Energia.

Starting from 2021, Enefit Kaevandused was merged with another subsidiary of Eesti Energia, Enefit Energiatootmine, to create an integrated oil shale company.

== Gallery ==
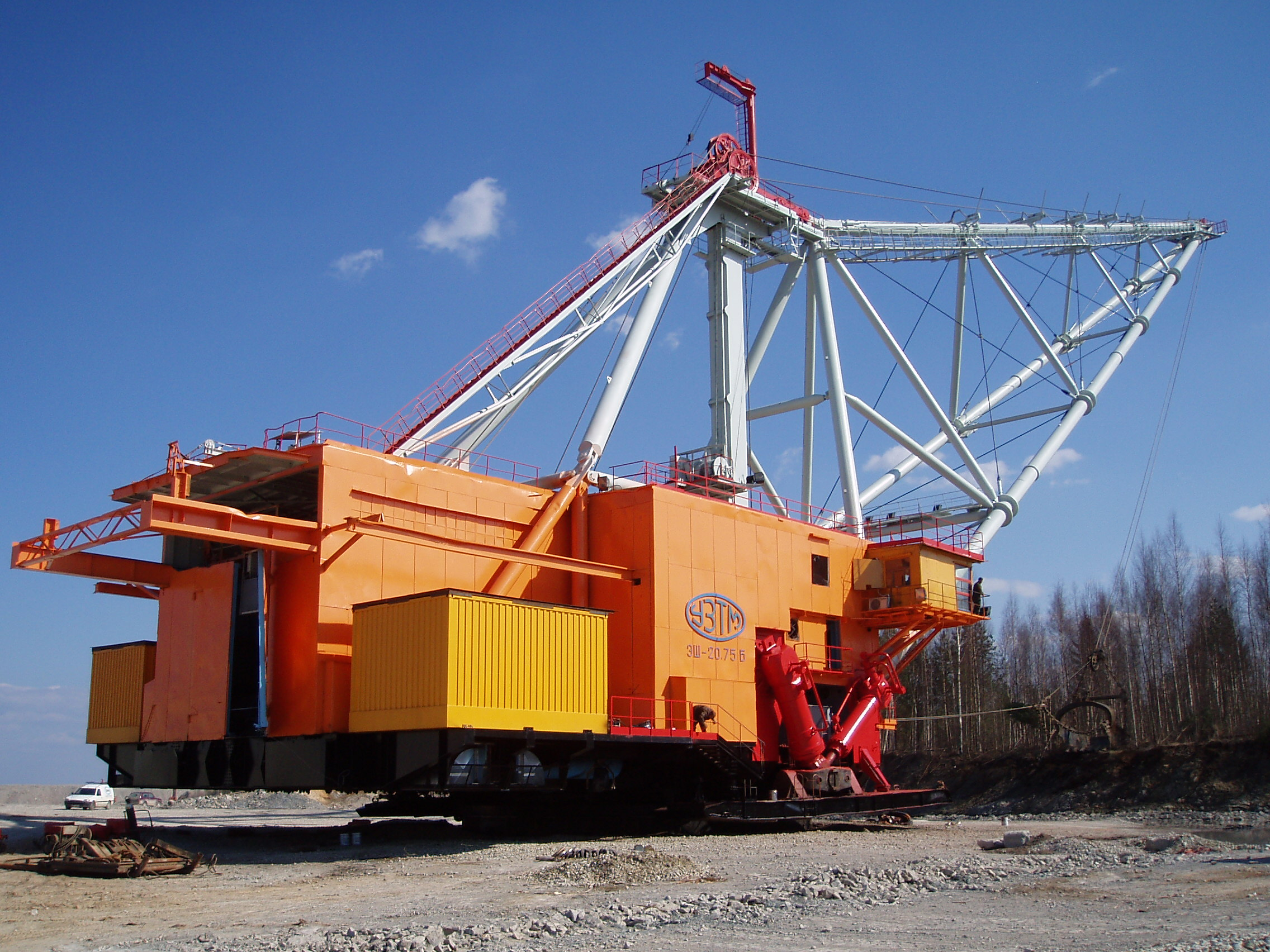
Dragline excavator in Narva mine.

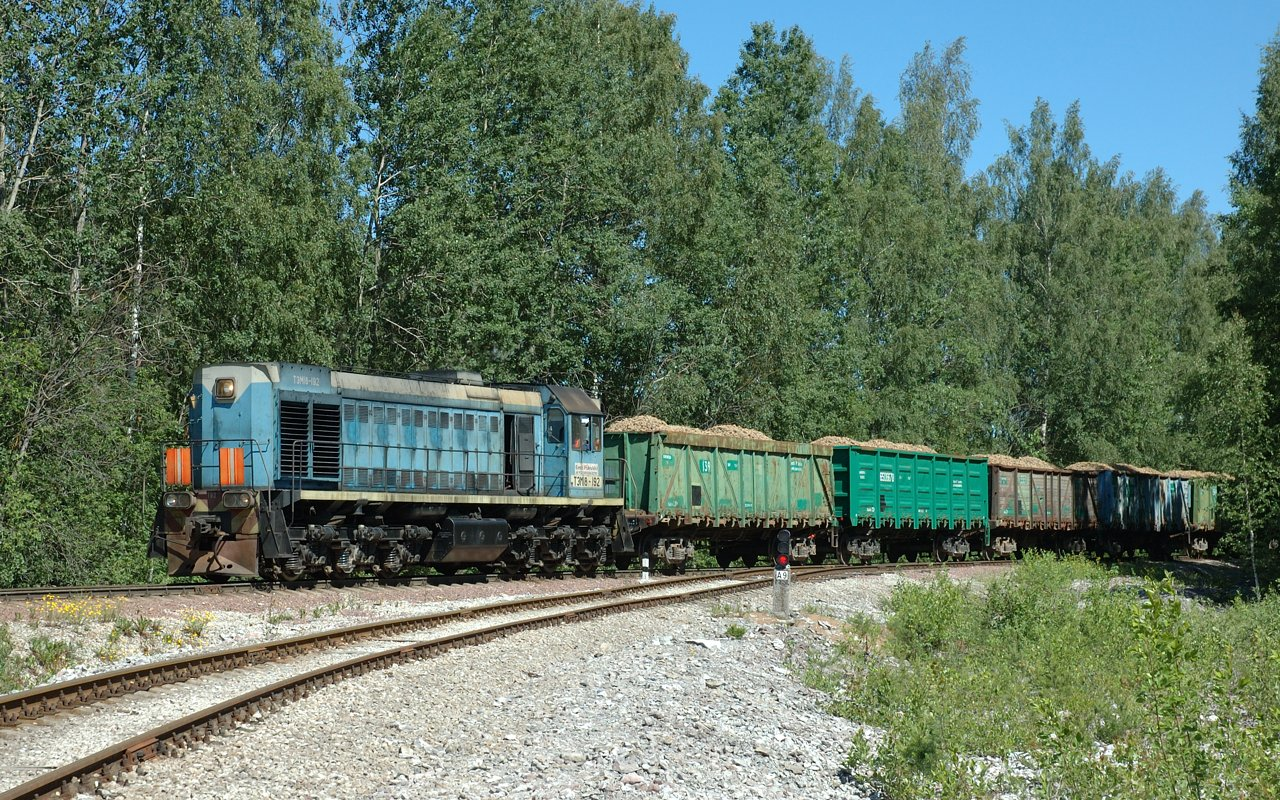
Company's train transporting oil-shale near Ahtme.

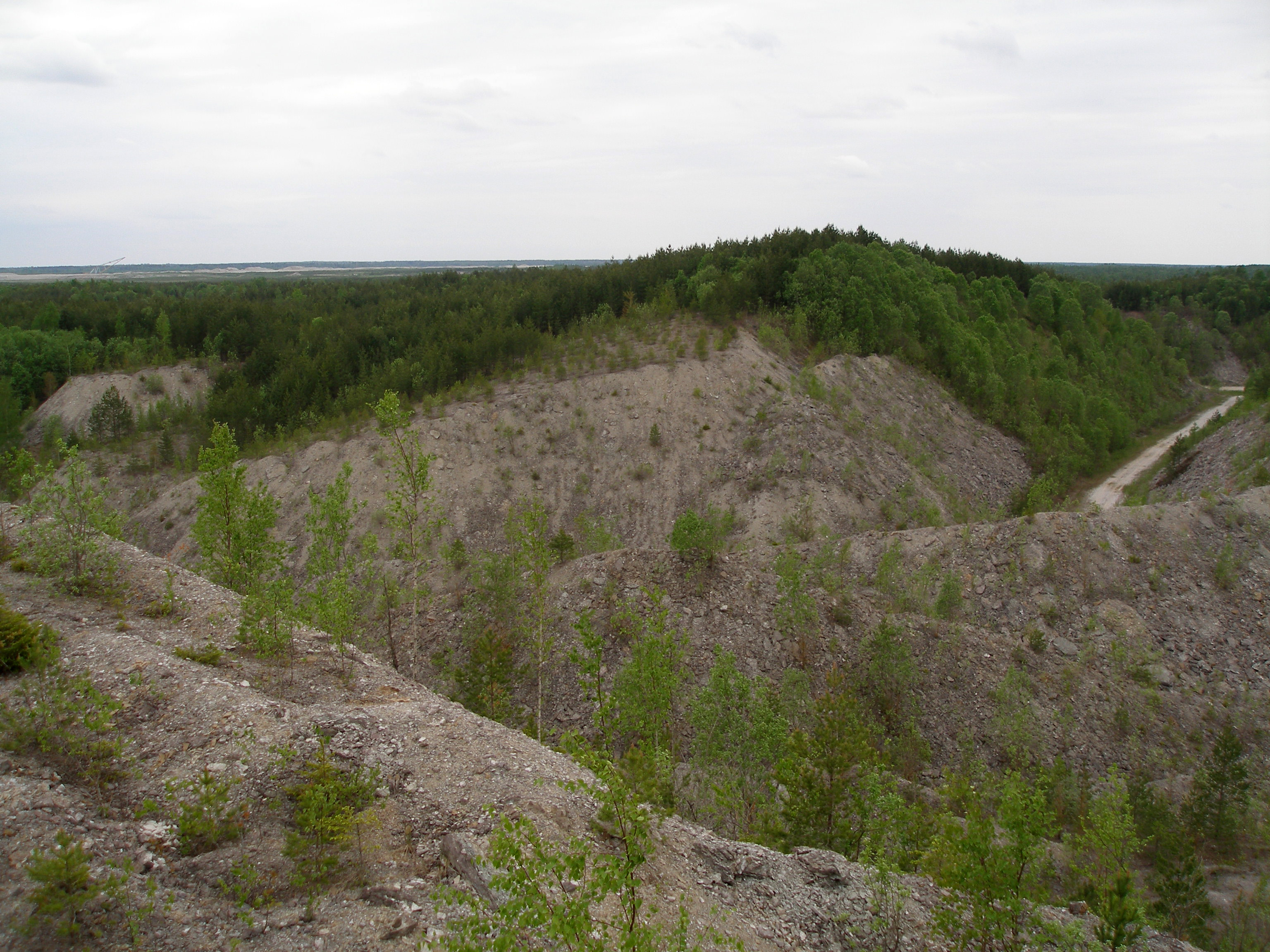
Unrehabilitated land in older part of Aidu mine.

== See also ==
- Energy in Estonia

== Bibliography ==
- Saarnak, Martin; Uibopuu, Lembit; Valgma, Ingo; Nurme, Martin; Väizene, Vivika (2014). "6. Eesti põlevkivi kaevandamisviisid" [6. Mining methods of Estonian oil shale] (PDF). In Valgma, Ingo (ed.). Mäendus [Mining] (in Estonian). Institute of Mining. Tallinn University of Technology. pp. 55–68. ISBN 978-9949-430-80-2. Archived from the original (PDF) on 2018-05-20.
