= Enefit Solutions =

Company based in Estonia

Enefit Solutions AS
- Industry: Engineering
- Predecessor: Eesti Energoremont; Mäetehnika
- Founded: 1959
- Headquarters: Jõhvi, Estonia
- Key people: Kaarel Variksaar (CEO)
- Products: equipment for power generation, oil and gas, and mining industries
- Production output: 1000–2000 tonnes of metal structures annually
- Services: design, erection, maintenance of equipment for power generation, oil and gas, and mining industries
- Owner: Eesti Energia
- Number of employees: ca 1134 (2020)
- Website: www.enefitsolutions.com

Enefit Solutions (former names: Eesti Energia Tehnoloogiatööstus and Energoremont) is an engineering company in Jõhvi, Estonia. It is a subsidiary of Eesti Energia. The company designs and manufactures equipment in the fields of energy and industry and offers erection and maintenance services as well as comprehensive technological solutions.

The company was created in 1959 as Eesti Energoremont, based in Narva. It was the engineering and maintenance unit of the power generation industry in Estonia. Another predecessor of the company was the engineering and maintenance unit of the oil-shale mining industry, based in Jõhvi. This unit was later renamed AS Mäetehnika. In 2007, Eesti Energia merged these two subsidiary companies into Eesti Energia Tehnoloogiatööstus. After the merger, the company continued to operate in two separate facilities in Narva and Jõhvi; however, in 2013 the Narva facility was closed, and all production was moved to Jõhvi. In 2016, the company was renamed Enefit Solutions.
