= Oil shale reserves =

Oil shale resources that are economically recoverable

Oil shale reserves refers to oil shale resources that are economically recoverable under current economic conditions and technological abilities. Oil shale deposits range from small presently economically unrecoverable to large potentially recoverable resources. Defining oil shale reserves is difficult, as the chemical composition of different oil shales, as well as their kerogen content and extraction technologies, vary significantly. The economic feasibility of oil shale extraction is highly dependent on the price of conventional oil; if the price of crude oil per barrel is less than the production price per barrel of oil shale, it is uneconomic.

As source rocks for most conventional oil reservoirs, oil shale deposits are found in all world oil provinces, although most of them are too deep to be exploited economically. There are more than 600 known oil shale deposits around the world. Although resources of oil shale occur in many countries, only 33 countries possess known deposits of possible economic value.

Many deposits need more exploration to determine their potential as reserves. Well-explored deposits, which could ultimately be classified as reserves, include the Green River deposits in the western United States, the Tertiary deposits in Queensland, Australia, deposits in Sweden and Estonia, the El-Lajjun deposit in Jordan, and deposits in France, Germany, Brazil, China, and Russia. It is expected that these deposits would yield at least 40 liters (0.25 bbl) of shale oil per metric ton of shale, using the Fischer Assay.

A 2016 conservative estimate set the total world resources of oil shale equivalent to yield of 6.05 trillion barrels (962 billion cubic metres) of shale oil, with the largest resource deposits in the United States accounting for more than 80% of the world total resource. For comparison, at the same time the world's proven oil reserves are estimated to be 1.6976 trillion barrels (269.90 billion cubic metres).

== Oil shale geology ==
Oil shale formation takes place in a number of depositional settings and has considerable compositional variation. Oil shales can be classified by their composition (carbonate minerals such as calcite or detrital minerals such as quartz and clays) or by their depositional environment (large lakes, shallow marine, and lagoon/small lake settings). Much of the organic matter in oil shale is of algal origin, but may also include remains of vascular land plants. Three major type of organic matter (macerals) in oil shale are telalginite, lamalginite, and bituminite. Some oil-shale deposits also contain metals which include vanadium, zinc, copper, and uranium.

Most oil shale deposits were formed during Middle Cambrian, Early and Middle Ordovician, Late Devonian, Late Jurassic, and Paleogene times through burial by sedimentary loading on top of the algal swamp deposits, resulting in conversion of the organic matter to kerogen by diagenetic processes. The largest deposits are found in the remains of large lakes such as the deposits of the Green River Formation of Wyoming and Utah, USA. Oil-shale deposits formed in the shallow seas of continental shelves generally are much thinner than large lake basin deposits.

== Definition of reserves ==
Estimating shale oil reserves is complicated by several factors. Firstly, the amount of kerogen contained in oil shale deposits varies considerably. Secondly, some nations report as reserves the total amount of kerogen in place, including all kerogen regardless of technical or economic constraints; these estimates do not consider the amount of kerogen that may be extracted from identified and assayed oil shale rock using available technology and under given economic conditions. By most definitions, "reserves" refers only to the amount of resource which is technically exploitable and economically feasible under current economic conditions. The term "resources", on the other hand, may refer to all deposits containing kerogen. Thirdly, shale oil extraction technologies are still developing, so the amount of recoverable kerogen can only be estimated.

There are a wide variety of extraction methods, which yield significantly different quantities of useful oil. As a result, the estimated amounts of resources and reserves display wide variance. The kerogen content of oil shale formations differs widely, and the economic feasibility of its extraction is highly dependent on international and local costs of oil. Several methods are used to determine the quantity and quality of the products extracted from shale oil. At their best, these methods give an approximate value to its energy potential. One standard method is the Fischer Assay, which yields a heating value, that is, a measure of caloric output. This is generally considered a good overall measure of usefulness. The Fischer Assay has been modified, standardized, and adapted by the American Petroleum Institute. It does not, however, indicate how much oil could be extracted from the sample. Some processing methods yield considerably more useful product than the Fischer Assay would indicate. The Tosco II method yields over 100% more oil, and the Hytort process yields between 300% and 400% more oil.

== Size of the resource ==
The size of the oil shale resources is highly dependent on which grade cut-off is used. A 2008 estimate set the total world resources of oil shale at 689 gigatones—equivalent to yield of 4.8 trillion barrels (760 billion cubic metres) of shale oil, with the largest reserves in the United States, which is thought to have 3.7 trillion barrels (590 billion cubic metres), though only a part of it is recoverable. According to the 2010 World Energy Outlook by the International Energy Agency, the world oil shale resources may be equivalent of more than 5 trillion barrels (790 billion cubic metres) of oil in place of which more than 1 trillion barrels (160 billion cubic metres) may be technically recoverable.

A 2016 conservative estimate by the World Energy Council set the total world resources of oil shale equivalent to yield of 6.05 trillion barrels (962 billion cubic metres). For comparison, at the same time the world's proven oil reserves are estimated to be 1.6976 trillion barrels (269.90 billion cubic metres).

== Geographical allocation ==
There is no comprehensive overview of oil shale geographical allocation around the world. Around 600 known oil shale deposits are diversely spread throughout the earth, and are found on every continent with the possible exception of Antarctica, which has not yet been explored for oil shale. Oil shale resources can be concentrated in a large confined deposit such as the Green River formations, which were formed by a large inland lake. These can be many meters thick but limited by the size of the original lake. They may also resemble the deposits found along the eastern American seaboard, which were the product of a shallow sea, in that they may be quite thin but laterally expansive, covering thousands of square kilometers.

Largest oil shale deposits (over 1 billion metric tons) (Dyni 2006)
Deposit	Country	Period	In-place shale oil resources (million barrels)	In-place oil shale resources (million metric tons)
Green River Formation	United States	Paleogene	1,466,000	213,000
Phosphoria Formation	United States	Permian	250,000	35,775
Eastern Devonian	United States	Devonian	189,000	27,000
Heath Formation	United States	Early Carboniferous	180,000	25,578
Olenyok Basin	Russia	Cambrian	167,715	24,000
Congo	Democratic Republic of Congo	?	100,000	14,310
Irati Formation	Brazil	Permian	80,000	11,448
Sicily	Italy	?	63,000	9,015
Tarfaya	Morocco	Cretaceous	42,145	6,448
Volga Basin	Russia	?	31,447	4,500
Leningrad deposit, Baltic Oil Shale Basin	Russia	Ordovician	25,157	3,600
Vychegodsk Basin	Russia	Jurassic	19,580	2,800
Wadi Maghar	Jordan	Cretaceous	14,009	2,149
Graptolitic argillite	Estonia	Ordovician	12,386	1,900
Timahdit	Morocco	Cretaceous	11,236	1,719
Collingwood Shale	Canada	Ordovician	12,300	1,717
Italy	Italy	Triassic	10,000	1,431

The table below reports reserves by estimated amount of shale oil. Shale oil refers to synthetic oil obtained by heating organic material (kerogen) contained in oil shale to a temperature which will separate it into oil, combustible gas, and the residual carbon that remains in the spent shale. All figures are presented in barrels and metric tons.

Shale oil: resources and production at end-2008 by regions and countries with resources over 10 billion barrels of in-place shale oil (Dyni 2010)
Region	In-place shale oil resources (million barrels)	In-place oil shale resources (million metric tons)	Production in 2008 (thousand metric tons (oil))
Africa	159,243	23,317	-
Democratic Republic of the Congo	100,000	14,310	-
Morocco	53,381	8,167	-
Asia	613,145	83,836	375
China	354,430	47,600	375
Pakistan	91,000	12,236	-
Russia	167,715	24,000	-
Europe	368,156	52,845	355
Russia	247,883	35,470	-
Italy	73,000	10,446	-
Estonia	16,286	2,494	355
Middle East	38,172	5,792	-
Jordan	34,172	5,242	-
North America	3,722,066	539,123	-
United States	3,706,228	536,931	-
Canada	15,241	2,192	-
Oceania	31,748	4,534	-
Australia	31,729	4,531	-
South America	82,421	11,794	157
Brazil	82,000	11,734	159
World total	4,786,131	689,227	930

=== Africa ===
Major oil shale deposits are located in the Democratic Republic of Congo (equal to 14.31 billion metric tons of shale oil) and Morocco (12.3 billion metric tons or 8.16 billion metric tons of shale oil). Deposits in Congo are not properly explored yet. In Morocco, oil shale deposits have been identified at ten localities with the largest deposits in Tarfaya and Timahdite. Although reserves in Tarfaya and Timahdit are well explored, the commercial exploitation has not started yet and only a limited program of laboratory and pilot-plant research has been undertaken. There are also oil shale reserves in Egypt, South Africa, Madagascar, and Nigeria. The main deposits of Egypt are located in Safaga-Al-Qusayr and Abu Tartour areas.

=== Asia ===
Major oil shale deposits are located in China, which has an estimated total of 32 billion metric tons, of which 4.4 billion metric tons are technically exploitable and economically feasible. In 2008, the amount of potential shale oil was estimated at 354 billion barrels (5.63×10^{10} cubic metres) and in 2016 at 330 billion barrels (5.2×10^{10} cubic metres). The principal Chinese oil shale deposits and production lie in Fushun and Liaoning; others are located in Maoming in Guangdong, Huadian in Jilin, Heilongjiang, and Shandong. Professor Alan R. Carroll of University of Wisconsin–Madison estimates that Upper Permian lacustrine oil shale deposits of northwest China, absent from previous global oil shale assessments, are comparable to the Green River Formation.

In addition to China, major deposits are located in Thailand (18.7 billion metric tons), Pakistan (227 billion metric tons, of which 9.1 billion metric tons are technically exploitable and economically feasible), Kazakhstan (several deposits; major deposit at Kenderlyk Field with 4 billion metric tons), and Turkey (2.2 billion metric tons). Thailand's oil shale deposits are near Mae Sot, Tak Province, and at Li, Lamphun Province. Deposits in Turkey are found mainly in middle and western Anatolia. According to some reports, also Uzbekistan has major oil shale deposits of 47 billion metric tons, mainly located at Sangruntau but also at Baysun, Jam, Urtabulak, Aktau, Uchkyr and Kulbeshkak. Smaller oil shale reserves have also been found in India, Turkmenistan, Myanmar, Armenia, and Mongolia.

=== Europe ===
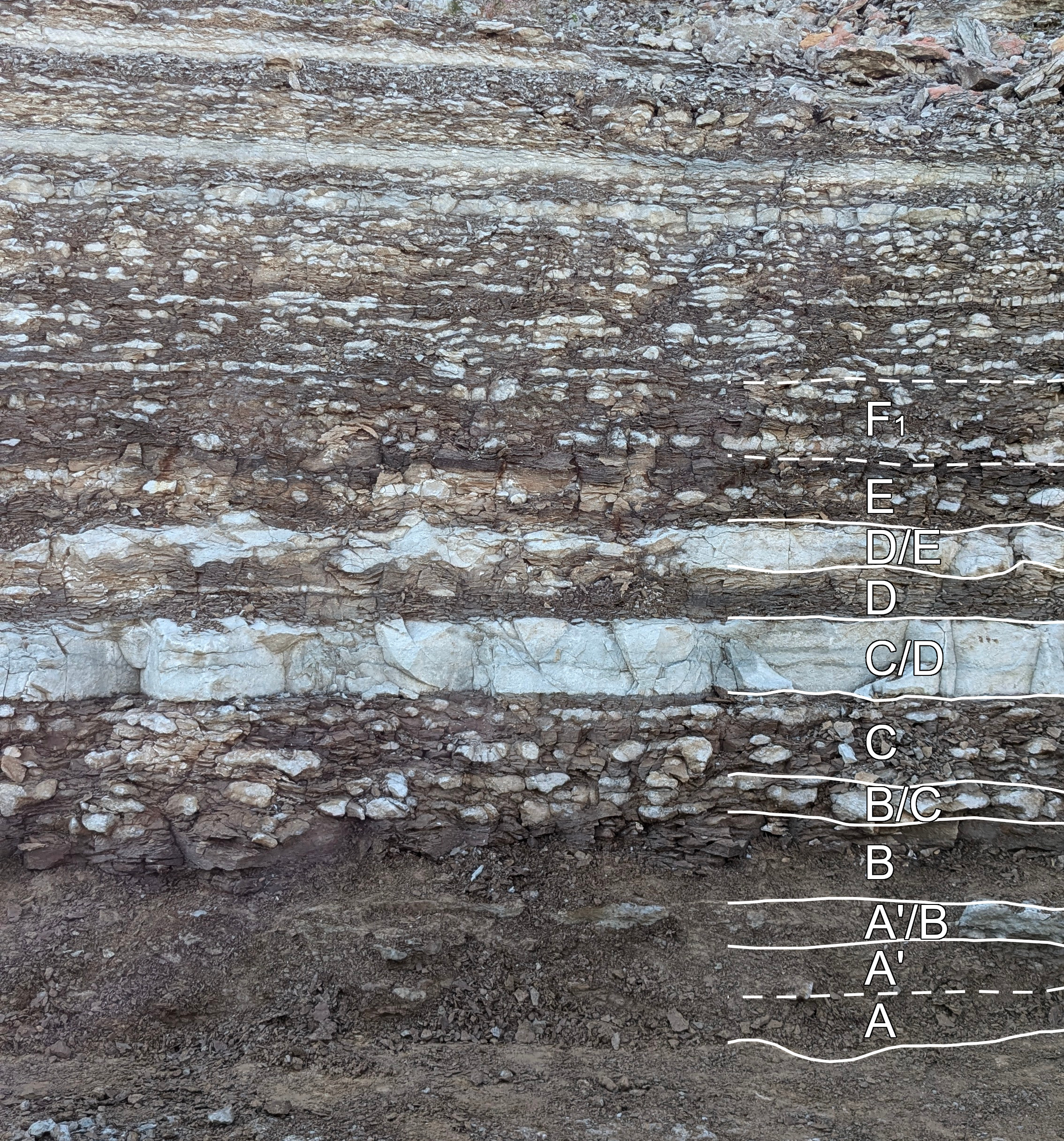
Outcrop of Ordovician kukersite oil shale, northern Estonia

The biggest oil shale reserves in Europe are located in Russia (equal to 35.47 billion metric tons of shale oil). Major deposits are located in the Volga-Petchyorsk province and in the Baltic Oil Shale Basin. Other major oil shale deposits in Europe are located in Italy (10.45 billion metric tons of shale oil), Estonia (2.49 billion metric tons of shale oil), France (1 billion metric tons of shale oil), Belarus (1 billion metric tons of shale oil), Sweden (875 million metric tons of shale oil), Ukraine (600 million metric tons of shale oil) and the United Kingdom (500 million metric tons of shale oil). There are oil shale reserves also in Germany, Luxembourg, Spain, Bulgaria, Hungary, Poland, Serbia, Austria, Albania, and Romania.

=== Middle East ===
Significant oil shale deposits are located in Israel (equal to about 250 billion barrels (4.0×10^{10} cubic metres) of shale oil) and in Jordan (equal to about 102 billion barrels (1.62×10^{10} cubic metres) of shale oil). In 2008, these resources were estimated 4 billion barrels (640,000,000 cubic metres) of shale oil and 34.172 billion barrels (5.4329×10^{9} cubic metres) of shale oil correspondingly. Jordan oil shales are high quality, comparable to western US oil shale, although their sulfur content is high. The best-explored deposits are El Lajjun, Sultani, and the Juref ed Darawish are located in west-central Jordan, while the Yarmouk deposit, close to its northern border, extends into Syria. Most of Israel's deposits are located in the Rotem Basin region of the northern Negev desert near the Dead Sea. Israeli oil shale is relatively low in heating value and oil yield.

=== North America ===
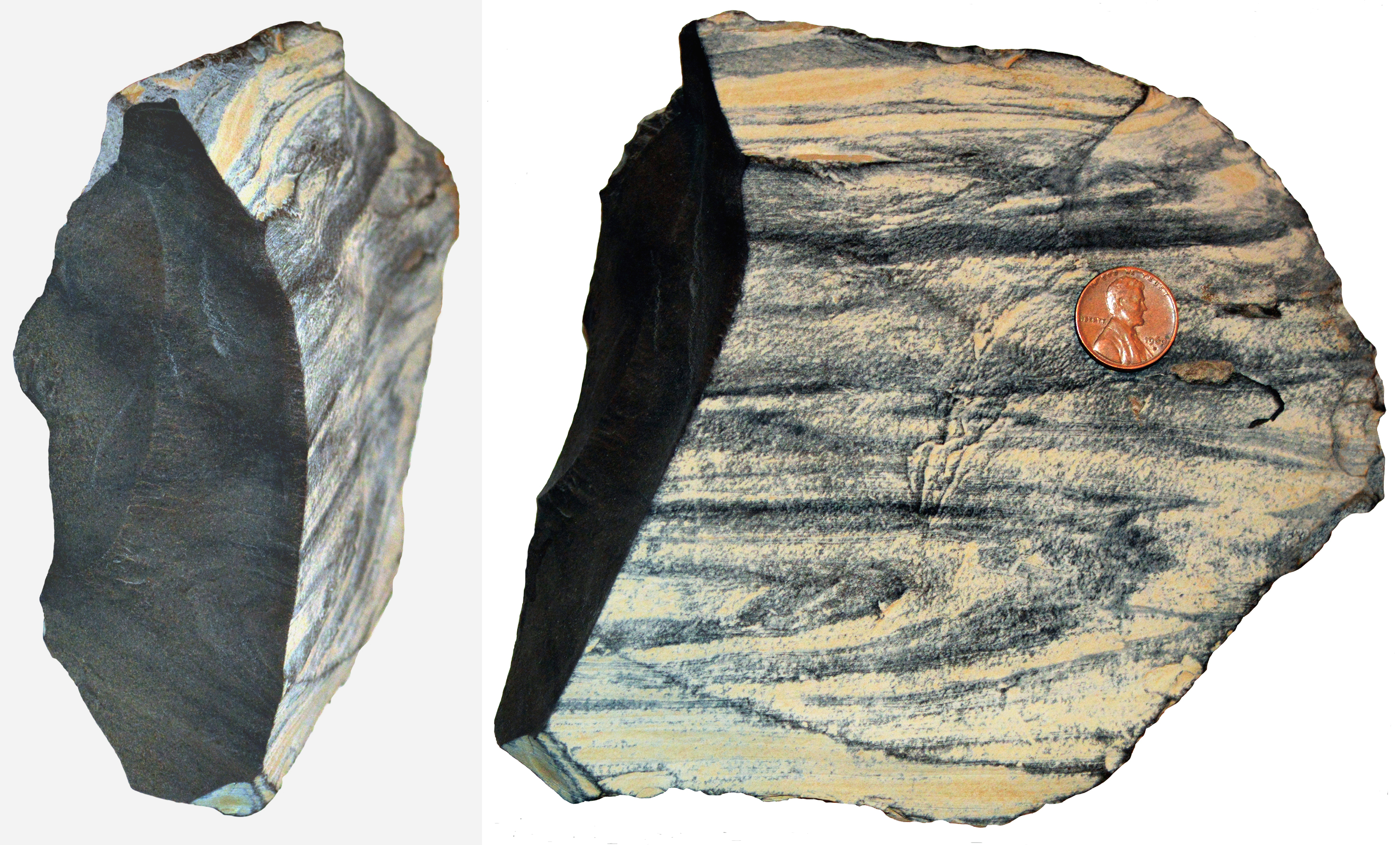
Oil shale from the Mahogany Zone of the Green River Formation, Colorado. Weathered surface on right; fresh surface on left.

At 301 billion metric tons, as estimated in 2005, the oil shale deposits in the United States are the largest in the world. There are two major deposits: the eastern US deposits, in Devonian-Mississippian shales, cover 250,000 square miles (650,000 km^{2}); the western US deposits of the Green River Formation in Colorado, Wyoming, and Utah, are among the richest oil shale deposits in the world.

More recent studies by the United States Geological Survey estimate that the resource in the United States may be bigger than previously estimated. According to these studies, three largest oil-shale deposits — all are part of the Green River Formation — are the Piceance Basin with 1.525157 trillion barrels (2.424806×10^{11} cubic metres), the Greater Green River Basin with 1.444992 trillion barrels (2.297354×10^{11} cubic metres), and the Uinta Basin with 1.318964 trillion barrels (2.096985×10^{11} cubic metres) in-place shale oil resources. In 2010, it was estimated by the World Energy Council that the United States resource could be equal to 3.7 trillion barrels (590 billion cubic metres) of shale oil. In 2016, their estimation was that the resource may even consist of up to 6 trillion barrels (950 billion cubic metres) of shale oil.

In Canada 19 deposits have been identified. The best-examined deposits are in Nova Scotia and New Brunswick.

=== Oceania ===
In 2008, Australia's oil shale resource was estimated at 4.531 billion metric tons of oil shale equal to 31.7 billion barrels (5.04×10^{9} cubic metres) of shale oil, of which about 24 billion barrels (3.8 billion cubic metres) is recoverable. The deposits are located in the eastern and southern states with the biggest potential in the eastern Queensland deposits. Oil shale has also been found in New Zealand.

=== South America ===
Brazil has at least nine oil shale deposits in São Mateus do Sul, Paraná, and in Vale do Paraíba. In 2008, the total oil shale resource was 11.734 billion metric tonnes, equal to 80–82 billion barrels (1.27×10^{10}–1.30×10^{10} cubic metres) of shale oil. Small resources are also found in Argentina, Chile, Paraguay, Peru, Uruguay, and Venezuela.

== See also ==
- Oil shale industry
- Oil shale economics
- Countries by shale oil reserves

== Bibliography ==
- Dyni, John R. (2010). "Oil Shale". In Clarke, Alan W.; Trinnaman, Judy A. (eds.). 2010 Survey of Energy Resources (PDF) (22 ed.). World Energy Council. ISBN 978-0-946121-02-1. Archived from the original (PDF) on 2014-11-08.
- IEA (2010). World Energy Outlook 2010. Paris: OECD. ISBN 978-92-64-08624-1.
- World energy resources. Oil 2016 (PDF). World Energy Council. 2016. ISBN 978-0-946121-62-5.
