= Mountain West Energy =

- Company type: Private
- Industry: Oil shale industry
- Founded: 2005
- Headquarters: Highland, Utah, United States
- Key people: Kevin Shurtleff (President)
- Website: www.mtnwestenergy.com

Mountain West Energy, LLC is an American unconventional oil recovery technology research and development company based in Orem, Utah. It is a developer of the In-situ Vapor Extraction Technology, an in-situ shale oil extraction technology. The company owns 880 acres (3.6 km^{2}) oil shale leases in the Uintah Basin, Uintah County, Utah.

In 2008, Mountain West Energy won the Clean Technology and Energy Utah Innovation Award.

== Technology ==
Mountain West Energy has proposed an experimental technology for in-situ shale oil extraction called In-Situ Vapor Extraction. The company claims its technology would also be suitable for enhanced oil recovery and for extraction of heavy crude oil and oil sands. For conversion of the kerogen in oil shale into shale oil, the company proposes using a high temperature gas, injected through an injection well. In the oil shale formation, the gas would cause pyrolysis, releasing shale oil vapors. These vapors would be brought to the surface through an extraction well.

In 2009, Mountain West Energy concluded an exclusive agreement with San Leon Energy granting the San Leon rights to the technology for a three-year pilot project on the Tarfaya oil shale deposit of Morocco. San Leon signed a memorandum of understanding with the National Office of Hydrocarbon and Mining of Morocco on the Tarfaya oil shale deposit in May 2009.
