= Timahdit oil shale deposit =

- Location: Timahdite, Fès-Meknès, Morocco
- Products: Oil shale

The Timahdit oil shale deposit is an oil shale deposit located about 240 kilometres (150 mi) southeast of Rabat near Timahdite, Fès-Meknès, Morocco. It is the second largest oil-shale deposit in Morocco. Geologically, it comprises two basins: El koubbat and Angueur synclines. The oil shale formation is about 70 kilometres (43 mi) long and 4 to 10 kilometres (2.5 to 6.2 mi) wide. The volume of the El koubbat syncline formation is about 250 square kilometres (97 sq mi); the Angueur syncline area is about 100 square kilometres (39 sq mi).

The deposit is estimated to consist of 42 billion tons of oil shale, containing 16.1 billion barrels (2.56×10^{9} m^{3}) of shale oil. The oil shale formation's thickness varies from 80 to 250 metres (260 to 820 ft). Its moisture content is 6–11% and sulfur content is about 2%. On average it yields 70 litres (15 imp gal; 18 US gal) of shale oil per one ton of oil shale. As the Timahdit deposit is located near Ifrane National Park and Haut-Atlas Oriental National Park, oil extraction is an environmentally sensitive issue.

The Timahdit deposit was discovered during the 1960s. The deposit was researched and tested during the 1970s and 1980s. The Moroccan Office of Hydrocarbons and Mining (ONHYM) developed and tested a shale oil extraction process called T^{3} which in 1984–1986 produced approximately 400 tons of shale oil at Timahdit.
