= Countries by tight oil reserves =

Technically recoverable tight oil resources according to the EIA

Rank	Country/Region	Shale Oil proven reserves billion barrels
Total	World	425
1	Bahrain	80
2	United States	78
3	Russia	75
4	China	32
5	Argentina	27
6	Libya	26
7	United Arab Emirates	22
8	Australia	18
9	Chad	16
10	Venezuela	13

== Sources ==
- dawn.com
