= Eesti Energia =

Company based in Estonia

Eesti Energia Enefit
- Type: public limited company
- Industry: Electricity; Oil and gas Mining
- Founded: 1939
- Headquarters: Tallinn, Estonia
- Area served: Estonia, Latvia, Lithuania, Finland, Sweden, Poland, Jordan, Utah
- Key people: Andrus Durejko (CEO)
- Products: Electric power and heat Oil shale Shale oil
- Services: Electricity and heat distribution Sale of electricity
- Revenue: €880 million (2014)
- Operating income: 412,400,000 (2022)
- Net income: 215,700,000 (2022)
- Total assets: 3,969,900,000 (2022)
- Owner: Government of Estonia
- Number of employees: ~ 5000 (2020)
- Subsidiaries: Enefit Green
- Website: www.energia.ee

Eesti Energia AS is a public limited energy company in Estonia with its headquarters in Tallinn. It is the world's biggest oil shale to energy company. The company was founded in 1939. As of 2014, it operates in Estonia, Latvia, Lithuania, Finland, Jordan and Utah, United States. In Estonia, the company operates under the name Eesti Energia, while using the brand name Enefit for international operations. The main raw material for energy production – oil shale – is extracted from mines located in Eastern Estonia and owned by the company. The group of Eesti Energia has three main operation areas: electricity generation, shale oil production, and sale and distribution of electricity. Its shares are owned by the Government of Estonia.

== History ==
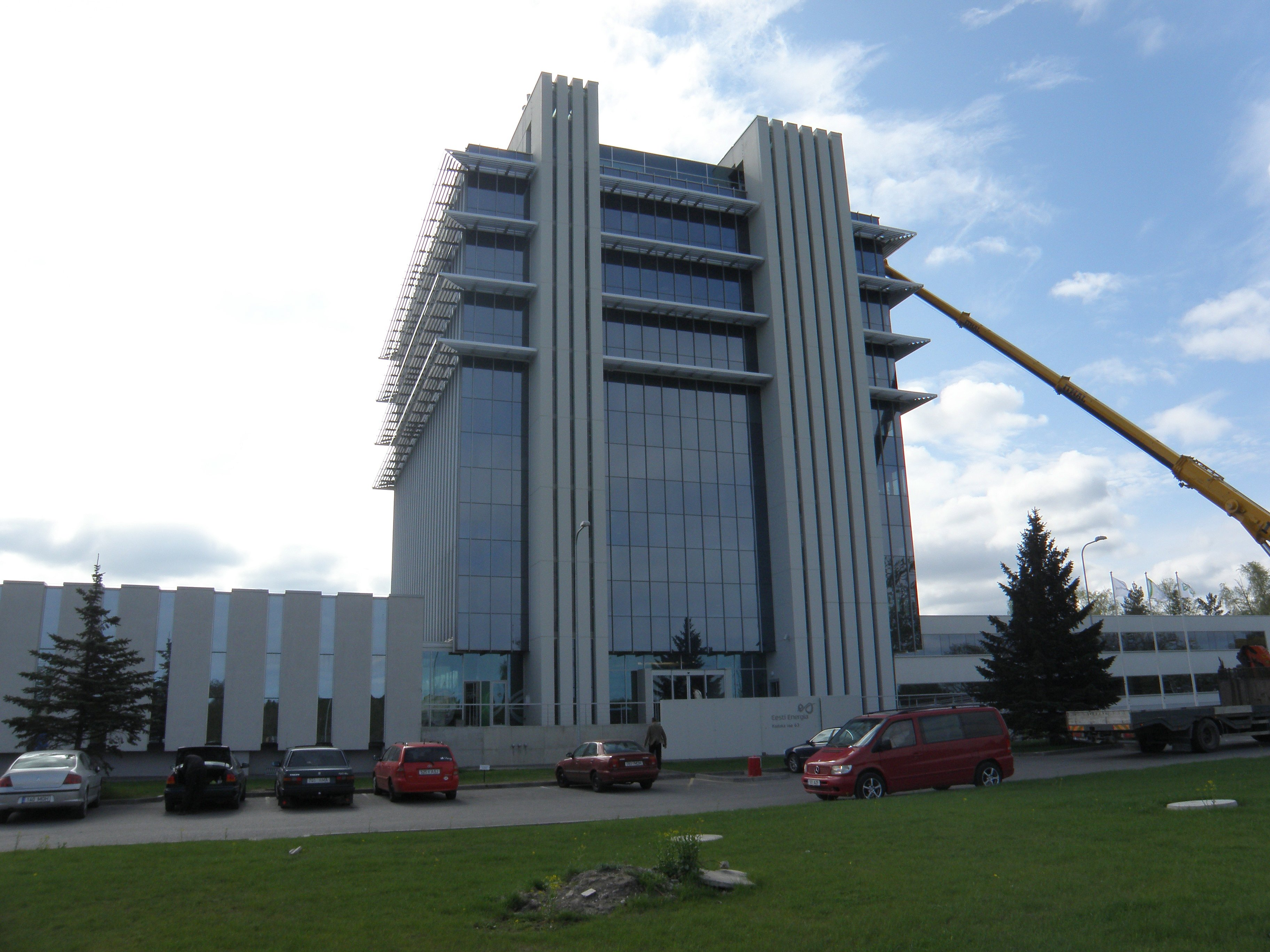
Elektrilevi service office in Kadaka, Tallinn.

Eesti Energia was founded in 1939. In 1998, it was reorganized from the state enterprise to a private limited company. In 1998–1999, two distribution companies (Läänemaa Eletrivõrk and Narva Elektrivõrk) were separated from Eesti Energia and privatized.

In 1995, the Government of Estonia started negotiations with NRG Energy, a subsidiary of Northern States Power Company, to create a joint venture on the basis of Narva Power Plants, a subsidiary of Eesti Energia. According to the basic terms of sale, agreed in 2000, NRG Energy was to acquire 49% stake in Narva Power Plants. In addition, at that time Narva Power Plants owned also 51% stake in the oil-shale mining company Eesti Põlevkivi. The proposed deal got a strong public and political opposition. The deal was cancelled by the Government on 8 January 2002 after NRG Energy failed to secure financing for the deal by the agreed-upon deadline. On 21 August 2002 NRG Energy filed to the London court claiming £100 million compensation for damages from the cancelled deal; however this claim was rejected.

In 1999, Government handed 51% of shares of Eesti Põlevkivi to Narva Elektrijaamad. In 2003, Government transferred remained 49% stake in Eesti Põlevkivi to Eesti Energia. Also Narva Elektrijaamad-owned 51% stake was transferred to Eesti Energia and Eesti Põlevkivi became a fully owned subsidiary of Eesti Energia.

In 2000, Eesti Energia and Latvenergo announced a plan to merge companies to create a new Baltic Power Group. However, this deal was halted due to Latvian legislation forbidding privatization of Latvenergo and uncertainties around the NRG deal.

In 2003, Eesti Energia tried to privatize Lithuanian distribution company RST. Although Eesti Energia fulfilled the privatization criteria and was the only bidder at the final stage of privatization, the privatization was halted by the Lithuanian Government.

On 1 December 2005, during his visit to Estonia, Lithuanian Prime Minister Algirdas Brazauskas met with the CEO of Eesti Energia Sandor Liive to discuss Eesti Energia's participation in the proposed Visaginas Nuclear Power Plant project. On 8 March 2006, the heads of Lietuvos Energija, Eesti Energia and Latvenergo during their meeting in Ignalina signed a memorandum of understanding on the preparation for construction of a new nuclear reactor in Lithuania. Eesti Energia negotiated for six years; however, the project was put on hold after government change in Lithuania at the end of 2012.

In 2006, Eesti Energia started to trade at Nord Pool Spot power exchange by acquiring Finnish trading company Solidus Oy. At the same year it started to sell electricity in Latvia and one year later in Lithuania. The company started its international oil shale activities in 2006. That year its subsidiary Oil Shale Energy of Jordan was created for the shale oil development project in Jordan. The memorandum of understanding between Eesti Energia and Government of Jordan was signed on 5 November 2006. The concession agreement was signed on 11 May 2010 in the presence of Jordanian and Estonian prime ministers Samir Zaid al-Rifai and Andrus Ansip. In March 2011, it acquired 100% shares of the Utah-based Oil Shale Exploration Company.

To implement the EU 3rd energy package, on 28 August 2009 Government decided to separate and buy-out the transmission system operator Elering from Eesti Energia. The transaction was concluded on 28 January 2010.

In 2010, the government considered the initial public offering of shares at the London Stock Exchange; however, this plan was postponed.

On 29 May 2018, it was announced that Enefit Green, a renewable energy subsidiary of Eesti Energia, will acquire 100% of shares in the renewable energy company Nelja Energia for €289 million. In addition, it will take over €204 million of Nelja Energia loans. The deal was approved and completed in November 2018.

As of 2019, 100% of 4Energia's shares belong to Eesti Energia, so it owns 17 wind farms in Estonia and Lithuania with a total capacity of 287 MW, a biomass-fired 3.9 MW electricity and 19.2 MW heat cogeneration plant in Latvia, and a pellet plant with an annual production of 140,000 tons.

== Operations ==
Eesti Energia produces and sells electricity, heat and fuel (oil shale and shale oil) and provides customer and consulting services. The company is engaged in the oil shale mining through its subsidiary Enefit Kaevandused, which extracts oil shale by opencast mining in the Narva quarry and by underground mining in the Estonia mine.

Eesti Energia produces electrical power and heat in Narva Power Plants, which provides around 95% of the electrical energy consumed in Estonia and supplies the whole town of Narva with heat.

For shale oil production, Eesti Energia operates the Narva Oil Plant, which uses a Galoter-type solid heat carrier technology process. The plant operates two Enefit-140 shale oil units. The plant produces about 1.4 million tonnes of shale oil per year. As of 2013, the new-generation Enefit280 plant is in hot-commissioning process.

=== International activities ===
In Jordan, its subsidiary Jordan Oil Shale Energy Company is preparing construction of a shale oil plant with capacity of 36,000 barrels per day (5,700 m^{3}/d). The shale oil plant will use the Enefit processing technology; construction is slated to begin by 2015. Its another subsidiary in Jordan, Attarat Power Company, is planning to build a 460 MW oil-shale-fired power plant at Attarat Umm Ghudran. The power station is expected to be operational by 2016, however construction started in 2017 with an expected completion for 2021.

In Utah, United States, its subsidiary Enefit American Oil owns or leases more than 30,000 acres (120 km^{2}) of oil shale property in the Green River Basin. Enefit American Oil plans to build a 57,000 barrels per day (9,100 m^{3}/d) shale oil plant.

== Subsidiaries ==
Eesti Energia has following subsidiaries:

- Elektrilevi OÜ (100%) – a distribution network operator.
- Enefit Power – an oil shale power and mining subsidiary created by merger of Enefit Kaevandused and Enefit Energiatootmine.

- Orica Eesti OÜ (35%)

- Enefit US LLC (100%)

- Enefit American Oil (former name: Oil Shale Exploration Company, 100%, United States), developer of the Utah oil shale project.

- Attarat Holding OÜ (100%)

- Attarat Power Company (10%, Jordan)

- Enefit SIA (100%, Latvia) – a subsidiary supplying energy in Latvia.
- Enefit UAB (100%, Lithuania) – a subsidiary supplying energy in Lithuania.
- Enefit Sp. z o.o. (100%, Poland) – a subsidiary supplying energy in Poland.
- Enefit AB (100%, Sweden) – a subsidiary supplying energy in Sweden.
- Enefit Oy (100%, Finland) – a subsidiary supplying energy in Finland.
- Enefit Green AS (100%) – renewable energy subsidiary

- SIA Enefit Power and Heat Valka (100%)
- Nelja Energia AS (100%)

- Enefit Solutions AS (100%) – manufacturer of energy and industrial equipment, maintenance and supply services.
- Enefit Outotec Technology (60%) – a joint venture with Outotec for developing shale oil extraction technology
- Enefit Jordan BV (76%, Jordan)

- Jordan Oil Shale Energy Company

== See also ==
- Eesti Energia Tehnoloogiatööstus
- Iru Power Plant
- Elering
