= Galoter process =

Shale oil extraction technology

Galoter process Enefit process
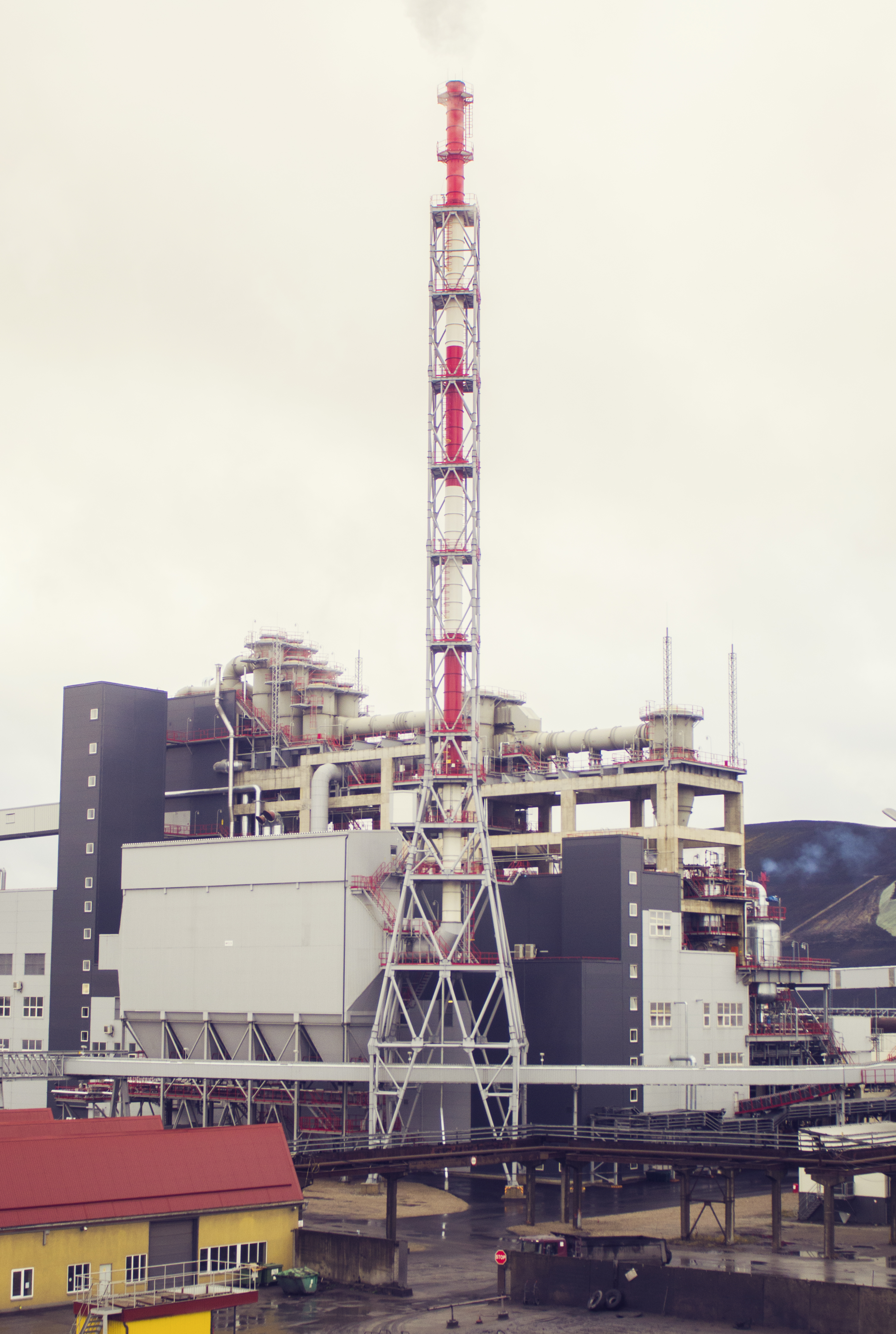
- VKG Petroter
- Process type: Chemical
- Industrial sector(s): Chemical industry oil industry
- Feedstock: oil shale
- Product(s): shale oil
- Leading companies: Eesti Energia; VKG Oil
- Main facilities: Narva Oil Plant; Petroter
- Inventor: Krzhizhanovsky Power Engineering Institute
- Developer(s): Eesti Energia; Outotec

The Galoter process (also known as TSK, UTT, or SHC; its newest modifications are called Enefit and Petroter) is a shale oil extraction technology for the production of shale oil, a type of synthetic crude oil. In this process, the oil shale is decomposed into shale oil, oil shale gas, and spent residue. Decomposition is caused by mixing raw oil shale with hot oil shale ash generated by the combustion of carbonaceous residue (semi-coke) in the spent residue. The process was developed in the 1950s, and it is used commercially for shale oil production in Estonia. There are projects for further development of this technology and expansion of its usage, e.g., in Jordan and the USA.

== History ==
Research on the solid heat carrier process for pyrolysis of lignite, peat, and oil shale started in 1944 at the G. M. Krzhizhanovsky Power Engineering Institute of the Academy of Sciences of the USSR. At the laboratory scale, the Galoter process was invented and developed in 1945–1946. The process was named Galoter after the research team leader, Israel Galynker, whose name was combined with the word "thermal".

Further research continued in Estonia. A pilot unit with a capacity of 2.5 tonnes of oil shale per day was built in Tallinn in 1947. The first Galoter-type commercial scale pilot retorts were built at Kiviõli, Estonia, in 1953 and 1963 (closed in 1963 and 1981, respectively), with capacities of 200 and 500 tonnes of oil shale per day, respectively. The Narva Oil Plant, annexed to the Eesti Power Plant and operating two Galoter-type 3000 tonnes per day retorts, was commissioned in Estonia in 1980. These retorts were designed by AtomEnergoProject and developed in cooperation with the Krzhizhanovsky Institute. Started as a pilot plant, the process of converting it to a commercial-scale plant took about 20 years. During this period, the company has modernized more than 70% of the equipment compared to the initial design.

In 1978, a 12.5-tonnes pilot plant was built in Verkhne-Sinevidnoy, Ukraine. It was used for testing Lviv–Volinsk lignite, and Carpathian, Kashpir (Russia), and Rotem (Israel) oil shales. In 1996–1997, a test unit was assembled in Tver.

In 2008, Estonian energy company Eesti Energia, an operator of Galoter retorts at the Narva Oil Plant, established a joint venture with the Finnish technology company Outotec called Enefit Outotec Technology to develop and commercialize a modified Galoter process–the Enefit process–which combines the current process with circulating fluidized bed technologies. In 2013, Enefit Outotec Technology opened an Enefit testing plant in Frankfurt. In 2012, Eesti Energia opened a new generation Galoter-type plant in Narva using Enefit 280 technology.

In 2009–2015, VKG Oil, a subsidiary of Viru Keemia Grupp, opened in Kohtla-Järve, Estonia, three modified Galoter-type oil plants called Petroter.

== Technology ==
=== Galoter retort ===
The Galoter process is an above-ground oil-shale retorting technology classified as a hot recycled solids technology. The process uses a horizontal cylindrical rotating kiln-type retort, which is slightly declined. It has similarities with the TOSCO II process.

Before retorting, the oil shale is crushed into fine particles with a size of less than 25 millimetres (1.0 in) in diameter. The crushed oil shale is dried in the fluidized bed drier (aerofountain drier) by contact with hot gases. After drying and pre-heating to 135 °C (275 °F), oil shale particles are separated from gases by cyclonic separation. Oil shale is transported to the mixer chamber, where it is mixed with hot ash of 800 °C (1,470 °F), produced by combustion of spent oil shale in a separate furnace. The ratio of oil shale ash to raw oil shale is 2.8–3:1. The mixture is moved then to the hermetic rotating kiln. When the heat transfers from the hot ash to raw oil shale particles, the pyrolysis (chemical decomposition) begins in oxygen deficit conditions. The temperature of pyrolysis is kept at 520 °C (970 °F). Produced oil vapors and gases are cleaned of solids by cyclones and moved to condensation system (rectification column) where shale oil condenses and oil shale gas is separated in gaseous form. Spent shale (semi-coke) is transported then to the separate furnace for combustion to produce hot ash. A portion of the hot ash is separated from the furnace gas by cyclones and recycled to the rotary kiln for pyrolysis. The remaining ash is removed from the combustion gas by more cyclones and cooled and removed for disposal by using water. The cleaned hot gas returns to the oil shale dryer.

The Galoter process has high thermal and technological efficiency, and high oil recovery ratio. Oil yield reaches 85–90% of Fischer Assay and retort gas yield accounts for 48 cubic meters per tonne. Oil quality is considered good, but the equipment is sophisticated and capacity is relatively low. This process creates less pollution than internal combustion technologies, as it uses less water, but it still generates carbon dioxide as also carbon disulfide and calcium sulfide.

=== Enefit process ===
Enefit process is a modification of the Galoter process being developed by Enefit Outotec Technology. In this process, the Galoter technology is combined with proven circulating fluidized bed (CFB) combustion technology used in coal-fired power plants and mineral processing. Oil shale particles and hot oil shale ash are mixed in a rotary drum as in the classical Galoter process. The primary modification is the replacing of the Galoter semi-coke furnace with a CFB furnace. The Enefit process also incorporates fluid bed ash cooler and waste heat boiler commonly used in coal-fired boilers to convert waste heat to steam for power generation. Compared to the traditional Galoter, the Enefit process allows complete combustion of carbonaceous residue, improved energy efficiency by maximum utilization of waste heat, and less water use for quenching. According to promoters, the Enefit process has a lower retorting time compare to the classical Galoter process and therefore it has a greater throughput. Avoidance of moving parts in the retorting zones increases their durability.

== Commercial use ==
Two Galoter retorts built in 1980 are used for oil production by the Narva Oil Plant, a subsidiary of the Estonian energy company Eesti Energia. Both retorts process 125 tonnes per hour of oil shale. The annual shale oil production is 135,000 tonnes and oil shale gas production is 40 million cubic metres per annum (1.4 billion cubic feet per annum). Since 2012, it also uses a new plant employing Enefit 280 technology with a processing capacity of 2.26 million tonnes of oil shale per year and producing 290,000 tonnes of shale oil and 75 million cubic metres (2.6 billion cubic feet) of oil shale gas. In addition, Eesti Energia planned to begin construction of similar Enefit plants in Jordan and in USA. Enefit Outotec Technology analysis suitability of Enefit technology for the Tarfaya oil shale deposit in Morocco, developed by San Leon Energy.

VKG Oil operates in Kohtal-Järve, Estonia three modified Galoter-type oil plants called Petroter. The basic engineering of these retorts was done by Atomenergoproject of Saint Petersburg. The basic engineering of the condensation and distillation plant was done by Rintekno of Finland. The plant has a processing capacity of 1.1 million tonnes of oil shale per year and it produces 100,000 tonnes of shale oil, 30 million cubic metres (1.1 billion cubic feet) of oil shale gas, and 150 GWh of steam per year.

Saudi Arabian International Corporation for Oil Shale Investment planned to utilize Galoter (UTT-3000) process to build a 30,000 barrels per day (4,800 m^{3}/d) shale oil plant in Jordan. Uzbekneftegaz planned to build eight UTT-3000 plants in Uzbekistan. However, in December 2015 Uzbekneftegaz announced a postponement of the project.

== See also ==
- Alberta Taciuk Process
- Petrosix process
- Kiviter process
- Fushun process
- Paraho process
- Lurgi-Ruhrgas process
