= Narva Power Plants =

Oil shale-fired power generation complex in Estonia

Eesti Power Plant
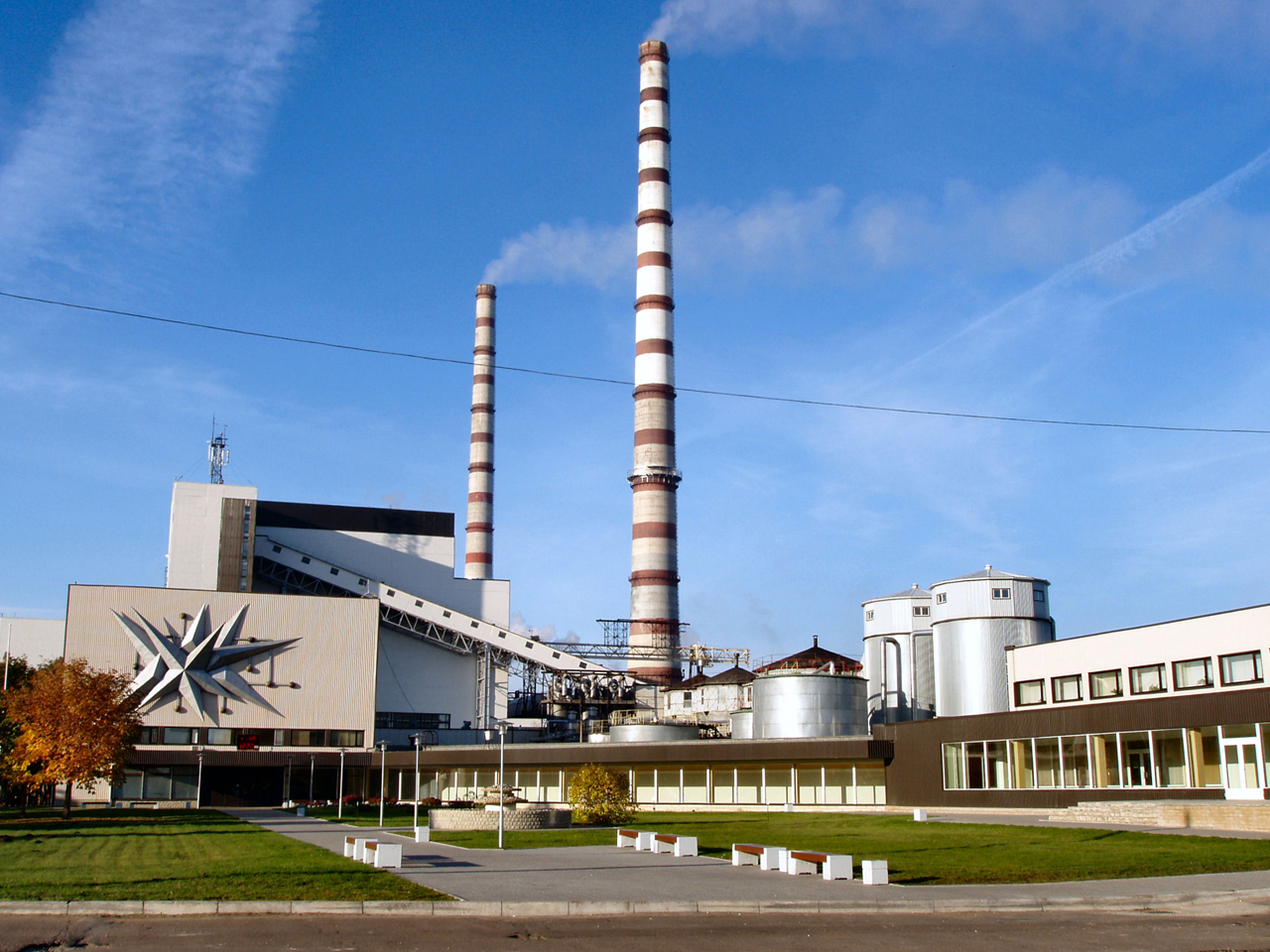
- Eesti Power Plant
- Country: Estonia
- Location: Auvere
- Coordinates: 59.269565°N 27.902184°E
- Status: Operational
- Construction began: 1963
- Commission date: 1973
- Owner: Eesti Energia
- Operator: Enefit Power

Thermal power station
- Primary fuel: Oil shale

Power generation
- Units operational: 7
- Nameplate capacity: 1,615 MW

Balti Power Plant
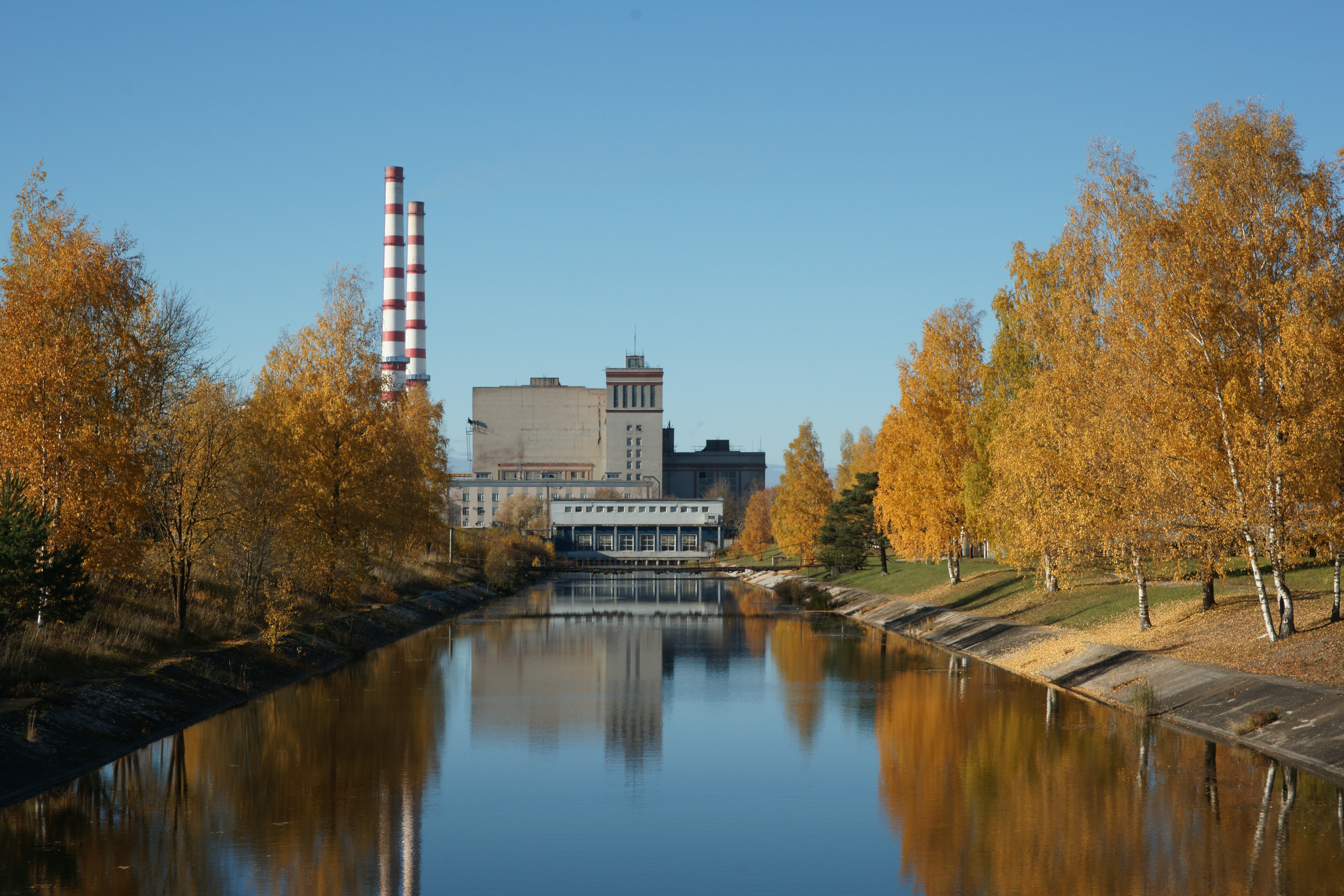
- Country: Estonia
- Location: Narva
- Coordinates: 59.353452°N 28.122811°E
- Status: Operational
- Construction began: 1959
- Commission date: 1965
- Owner: Eesti Energia
- Operator: Enefit Power

Thermal power station
- Primary fuel: Oil shale

Power generation
- Units operational: 6
- Nameplate capacity: 765 MW

Auvere Power Plant
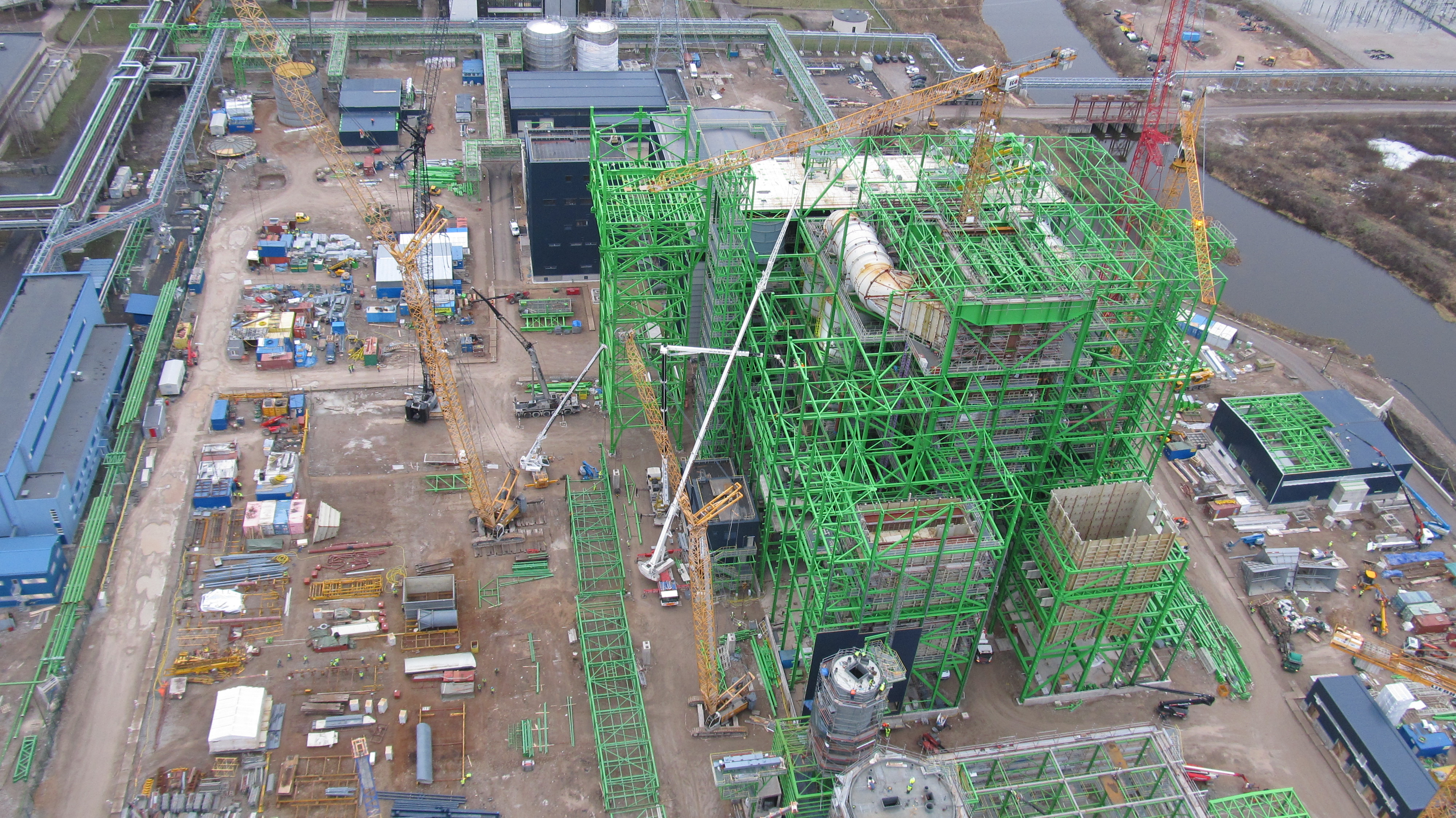
- Country: Estonia
- Location: Auvere
- Coordinates: 59.269969°N 27.894530°E
- Status: Operational
- Construction began: 2011
- Commission date: 2015
- Construction cost: 638 million euro
- Owner: Eesti Energia
- Operator: Enefit Power

Thermal power station
- Primary fuel: Oil shale
- Secondary fuel: Biomass

Power generation
- Units operational: 1
- Nameplate capacity: 300 MW

The Narva Power Plants (Estonian: Narva Elektrijaamad) are a power generation complex in and near Narva in Estonia, near the border with Leningrad Oblast, Russia. The complex consists of the world's two largest oil shale-fired thermal power plants, Eesti Power Plant (Eesti Elektrijaam) and Balti Power Plant (Balti Elektrijaam). In 2007, Narva Power Plants generated about 95% of total power production in Estonia. The complex is owned and operated by AS Narva Elektrijaamad, a subsidiary of Eesti Energia.

== Balti Power Plant ==
The Balti Power Plant was built between 1959 and 1965. It is located 5 kilometres (3 mi) south-west of Narva. As of the end of 2005, Balti Power Plant had an installed capacity of 765 MW. The installed thermal capacity was 400 MW. The cooling water is supplied from the Narva Reservoir, which is closely connected to the Narva River via two 1 kilometre (0.62 mi) long inlet channels. The Balti Power Plant is the sole supplier of thermal power for the district heating system of Narva.

The Balti Power Plant is divided into an old and a new part. The old part initially had eighteen TP-17 boilers and eight 100 MWe turbines. Four boilers and two turbines are currently in operation, while the others have been taken out of service. The new part has eight TP-67 boilers and four 200 MWe turbines. All these boilers use the pulverized combustion (PC) technology. In 2003, the Unit 11 was reconstructed to use the circulated fluidized bed combustion (CFBC) technology, which is more efficient and environmental-friendly (lower SO_{2} and CO_{2} emissions) than PC technology.

Balti Power Plant has four flue gas stacks, which are 149 metres (489 ft), 150.6 metres (494 ft), 153 metres (502 ft) and 182.6 metres (599 ft) tall.

== Eesti Power Plant ==
The Eesti Power Plant is located roughly 20 km west-south-west of Narva. It was built between 1963 and 1973. As of the end of 2005, Eesti Power Plant had installed capacity of 1,615 MW. The installed thermal capacity was 84 MW. Cooling water is supplied from the Narva River and Mustajõgi River via a 7 kilometres (4.3 mi) long open channel.

The Eesti Power Plant initially had sixteen TP-101 boilers and eight 200 MWe steam turbines. Fourteen boilers and seven turbines are currently in service. In 2003, the Unit 8 was reconstructed to use the CFBC technology.

Eesti Power Plant has two 250 metres (820 ft) tall flue-gas stacks, which are the tallest in Estonia.

In 2014, Eesti Power Plant was named as 15th among top 30 European Union's most polluting power plants. It also was the only listed power plant from Baltic states and Nordic countries region, emitting 10.67 Mt of CO_{2} per year into the atmosphere.

== Auvere Power Plant ==
On 14 January 2011, Narva Elektrijaamad signed a contract with the French power engineering company Alstom for construction of the new Auvere Power Plant next to the existing Eesti Power Plant. The initial €540 million contract foresaw a construction of a 300 MW oil shale-fired unit which was completed 2015. The unit utilizes a circulating fluidized bed boiler technology.

The original contract included an option for the second unit; however, in February 2014, plans for the second unit were cancelled.

A 26.5 MW/53.1 MWh grid battery started operating in February 2025.

In March 2026 the power plant's chimney was hit without major damage by an off course Ukrainian drone.

== Ash disposal ==
The oil shale burnt at Narva plants produces roughly 46% ash, so the stations produce about 4.5 million tons of ash per year. The ash-disposal system involves washing it away with water, and the dirty water is stored in ash-storage lagoons which appear bright blue on the satellite photos. Balti has two storage areas. The western one is divided into twelve sub-regions by banks about three metres wide, and is already closed. The eastern one is in current use and is divided into three sub-regions. The ash is highly alkaline, since the non-combustible portion of the oil shale is essentially limestone.

== Wind farm ==
In 2012, a 39 MW wind farm was erected on the closed ash field of Balti Power Plant. The wind farm consists of 17 Enercon E82 wind turbines, 2.3 MW each. The hub height is 107 metres (351 ft) and the rotor diameter is 82 metres (269 ft). To fasten the generators' foundations, 22-metre (72 ft) stakes have been drilled into the field's limestone base. The wind farm cost €60 million and was completed in 2012.

== See also ==
- Oil shale in Estonia
- Narva Hydroelectric Station
