= Roberts Pulling Team =

- Sport: Tractor pulling
- Category: Motorsports
- Founded: 1998
- Headquarters: Wilmington, Ohio
- President: Larry Roberts II

Official website
- www.robertspullingteam.com
- (United States)

The Roberts Pulling Team (RPT) is tractor pulling team that competes in the National Tractor Pullers Association (NTPA), Pro Pulling League (PPL) and Ohio State Tractor Pullers Association (OSTPA)

== History ==
The Roberts Pulling Team was founded by Larry Roberts II in 1998. Roberts II began his pulling sport career at the age of 15 in which he competed on a garden tractor puller. Roberts II competed for 3 years with local groups until he moved on in 1982. Sixteen years later in 1998 Roberts II returned to tractor pulling and is still involved with the sport to this day. Larry Roberts II has teamed up with Tim Howell and John Evans and Travis Foebar and Jordan Wolfer to make up the current Roberts Pulling Team.

== Pulling Classes ==
=== Super Stock ===
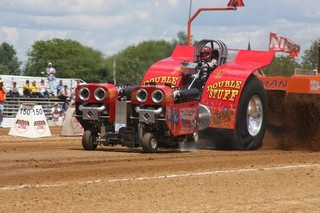
Double Stuff.

== Sponsorships ==
- R+L Carriers
- RLR Investments LLC
- R+L Racing

== See also ==
- Tractor Pulling
