= Kohtla-Järve Power Plant =

Power station in Estonia

- Official name: Kohtla-Järve soojuselektrijaam
- Country: Estonia
- Location: Kohtla-Järve
- Coordinates: 59.395833°N 27.241944°E
- Status: Operational
- Commission date: 1948
- Owner: Viru Keemia Grupp
- Operator: VKG Soojus

Thermal power station
- Primary fuel: Oil shale
- Secondary fuel: Oil shale gas
- Tertiary fuel: Shale oil
- Cogeneration?: Yes
- Thermal capacity: 534 MW

Power generation
- Make and model: Sverdlovsk Turbine Works
- Nameplate capacity: 39 MW

The Kohtla-Järve Power Plant (Estonian: Kohtla-Järve soojuselektrijaam) is an oil shale-fired power plant in Kohtla-Järve, Estonia, about 15 km to north-west of the Ahtme Power Plant. It is owned by VKG Soojus, a subsidiary of Viru Keemia Grupp. It consists of Põhja Power Plant and Lõuna Power Plant (stopped operations in 2009).

The Kohtla-Järve Power Plant (Põhja Power Plant) was commissioned in 1949–1967 with designed electrical capacity 48 MW. The first generator of the plant was commissioned in January 1949. This was the first time when the oil shale pulverized-firing combustion technology was implemented for power generation. The first generator had a capacity of 12 MW. At the beginning the plant used Riley Stoker boilers and General Electric generators; however, boilers developed for the pulverized firing of coal and lignite were not fit to work on pulverized oil shale.

As of 2005, the power plant had capacity of 39 MW electricity and 534 MW of heat. It is equipped by five stream generators and two hot water boilers (Barnaul BKZ-75-39F middle-pressure boilers). Its four turbines are manufactured by Fraser and Chalmers, Kirov Plant, Lang-Ganz, and Bryansk Turbine Works.

In addition, an oil shale gas-fired plant was built next to existing plant. This plant is equipped with Energomash manufactured boilers and Kaluga Turbine Works manufactured turbines.

== See also ==
- Energy in Estonia
