= R+L Carriers =

American freight shipping company

R+L Carriers, Inc.

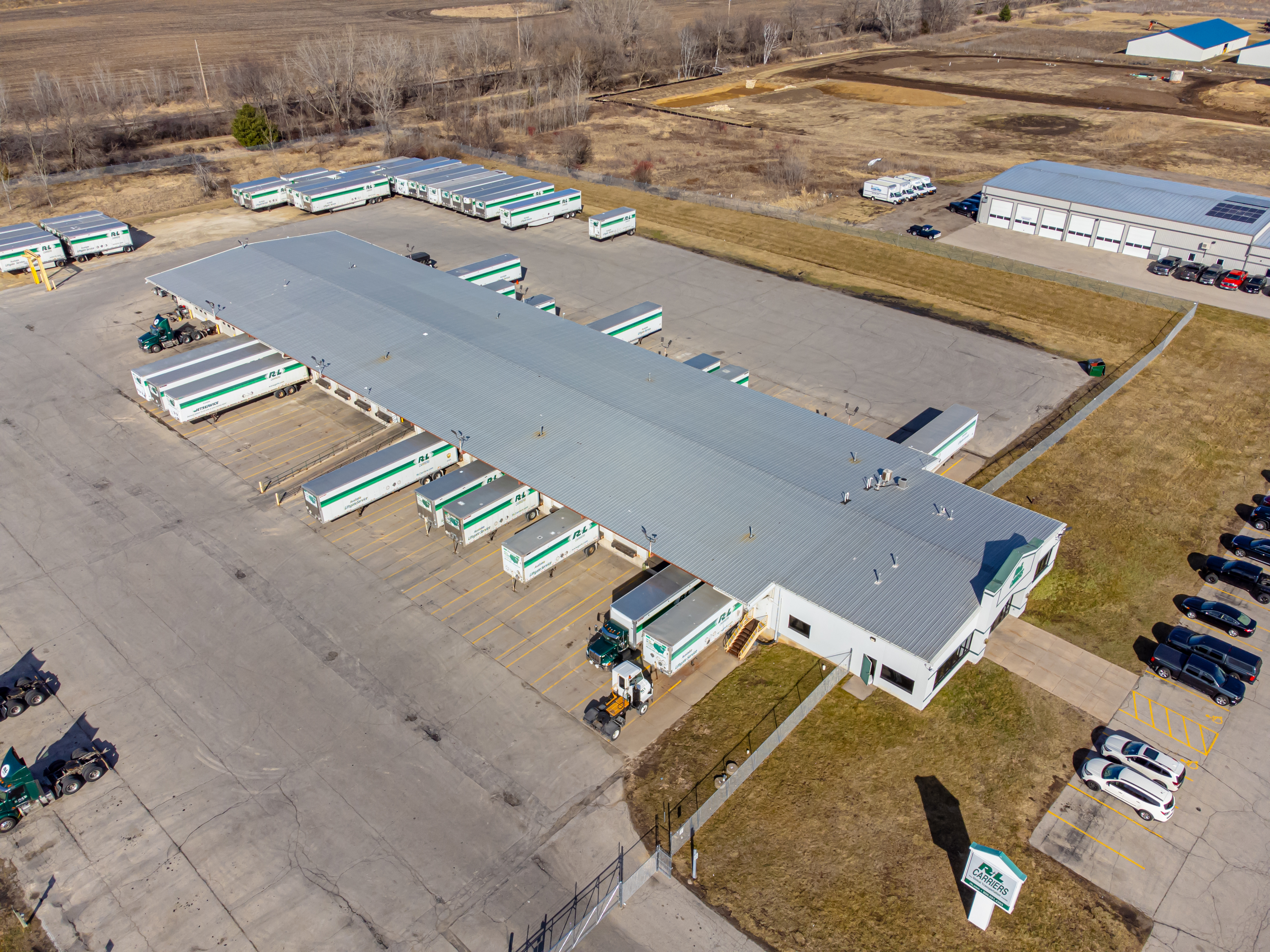
- R+L Carriers terminal in West Salem, Wisconsin
- Type: Private
- Industry: Less-than-truckload shipping
- Founded: 1965
- Founder: Ralph L. "Larry" Roberts (1945-2023)
- Headquarters: Wilmington, Ohio, U.S.
- Area served: United States; U.S. Virgin Islands; Canada; Dominican Republic
- Key people: Ralph L. "Larry" Roberts I (Founder); Roby Roberts (CEO); Robert G. Zimmerman (President)
- Number of employees: Under 10,000 (2015)
- Website: www.rlcarriers.com

R+L Carriers is a privately owned American freight shipping company based in Wilmington, Ohio, which grew over the course of 50 years from one truck to a fleet of 21,000 tractors and trailers. The company serves all 48 contiguous American states plus Canada, Puerto Rico, the U.S. Virgin Islands, and the Dominican Republic.

== History ==
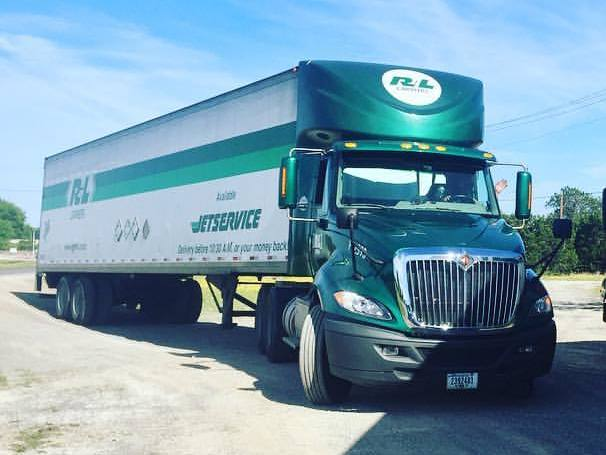
R+L Carriers truck with a 53' trailer

In 1965, Ralph L. "Larry" Roberts I and Ronald Campbell Jr. (1942-2020) purchased a single truck they used to haul furniture. This is when it was called R+L trucking, but Ronald Campbell Jr. left due to a worry that he wouldn’t be able to see his family. The business grew with the purchase of intrastate and interstate authority from Mayflower Moving and Storage, becoming R+L Carriers, Inc. When the early 1980s brought deregulation to the trucking industry with the Motor Carrier Act of 1980, the company became incorporated in conjunction with the design of a new system that resulted in the birth of R+L Transfer, Inc.

The initial operation was contained within Ohio, but soon expanded to five other Midwestern and Southern states. The May 1989 acquisition of Gator Freightways, Inc. further developed the company in the South. Growth continued with the purchase of Greenwood Motor Lines, Inc. in April 1992. In March 1996, the company purchased Herder Truck Lines, Inc., a Texas-based carrier, and expansion escalated. During the next five years, terminals and service were added to New York City and to 23 more states. Soon after, total coverage to New York State was achieved and partnerships to provide service to Alaska, Hawaii, Canada, and Puerto Rico were developed. Expanded coverage in Western states laid the groundwork for continued growth as 2003 brought about the opening of six additional Western states and yet another in 2005. Expansion continued in 2006 as operations began in Oregon and Washington. The final phase of expansion came in the spring of 2007 with expansion to northern California. This included service centers in three major markets of Fresno, Sacramento, and Oakland. Expansion would quickly continue into Southern California with facilities in Fontana and Los Angeles which completed the west coast expansion providing full state coverage. R+L Carriers ships an average of 45,000 shipments to these areas per day.

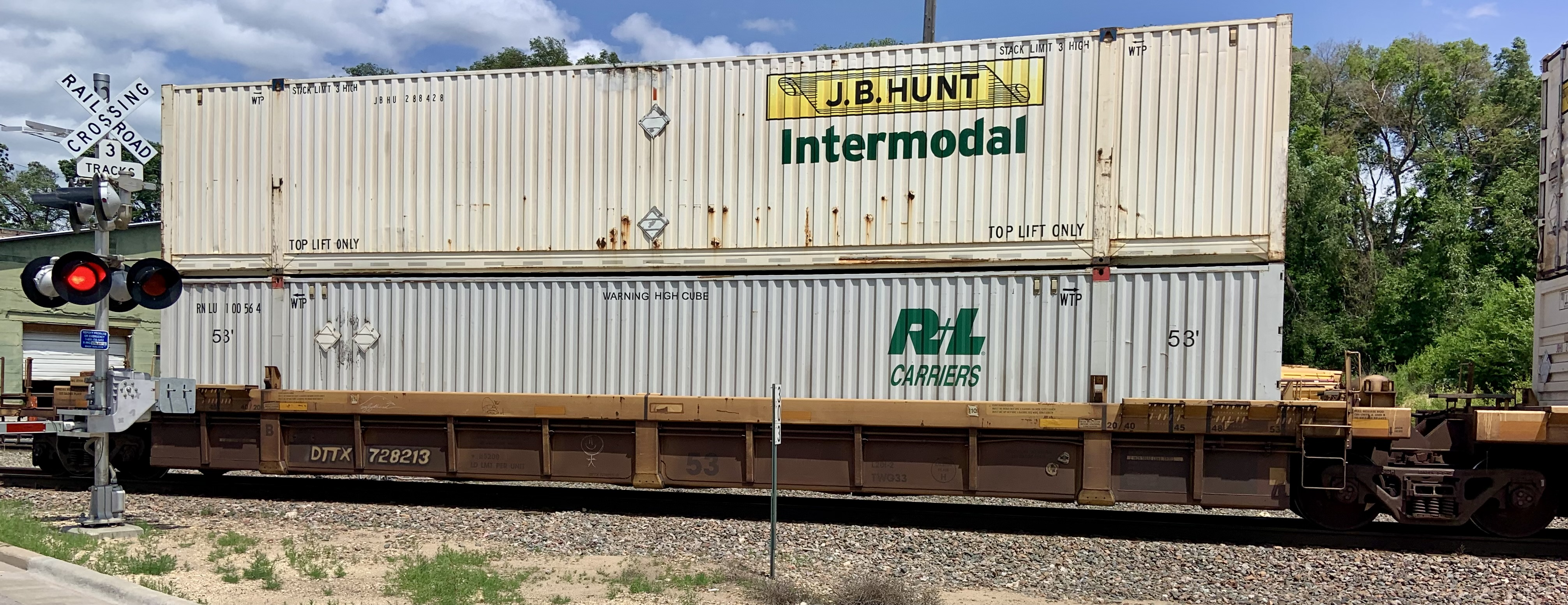
R+L Carriers 53' rail container

== Promotional activities ==
=== Lima Company Memorial ===
- R+L Carriers provides the transportation and sponsorship of the Lima Company Memorial, a series of life-size paintings of 23 fallen Marines from Lima 3/25 painted by Columbus, Ohio, artist Anita Miller. The memorial travels the country to raise awareness of the Marines and their families.

=== Professional Golf ===
- The company became the official presenting sponsor of the Coates Golf Championship in 2015, marking another milestone in its sports partnerships. The Coates Golf Championship presented by R+L Carriers is an LPGA event held at Golden Ocala in Ocala, Florida. The title sponsor, Coates Golf, is a premier golf equipment manufacturer solely dedicated to women's golf.

=== Motorsports ===
- R+L Carriers is a sponsor of Elite Motorsports & Tony Stewart for the 2026 NHRA drag racing season.
- R+L Carriers is a sponsor of the Roberts Pulling Team that competes in the National Tractor Pullers Association (NTPA), the Pro Pulling League (PPL), and the Ohio State Tractor Pullers Association (OSTPA).
- R+L Carriers annually sponsors the National Tractor Pullers Association (NTPA), the Pro Pulling League (PPL), and the Ohio State Tractor Pullers Association (OSTPA).

=== NCAA College Football ===
- R+L Carriers has sponsored the R+L Carriers New Orleans Bowl (see List of college bowl games) since Hurricane Katrina displaced the event from the Louisiana Superdome to the campus of the University of Louisiana at Lafayette in 2006. The company renewed their contract with the New Orleans Bowl through 2024.
