= Buckeye Bulldog =

The Buckeye Bulldog is a 1984 Mack Super Liner "Super Semi" built, owned and operated by Jesse Ray (J.R.) Collins (died September 2022), who resides in Chardon, Ohio. The Buckeye Bulldog is currently competing professionally in the National Tractor Pullers Association (NTPA). Collins, along with his pulling team (J.R. Collins Pulling Team) have won several National Championships throughout its 25-year career, and has been active in the pulling world longer than almost any other "Super Semi" in America. The Buckeye Bulldog also made an appearance in 2007 at an exposition pull in Rotterdam, Holland. The Buckeye Bulldog was shipped overseas to compete in a pull for the European Tractor Pullers Association with teams from all around the world.

The Buckeye Bulldog runs on a Mack V-8 Engine with four Turbo-Chargers, and displaces 998 cubic inches. Though it had at times in the past been run off anywhere from one to six Turbo-Chargers, it is now back to only four.

The "calling card" of the Buckeye Bulldog is the fire that is released from the truck's exhaust pipes before and after every pull.

== History ==
The Buckeye Bulldog is a five-time NTPA Super Semi Champion, and also a win in the famous Indy Super Pull in the early 1980s. J.R. has also won Three Super Semi "Puller of the Year" titles.

Before the 2009 pulling season, the Buckeye Bulldog was cosmetically and mechanically revamped, including a whole new red paint job, a new fiberglass cab, as well as a vast amount of under body suspension work. Though some controversy arose to other pullers in the Buckeye Bulldog's circuit, it was resolved by the end of the 2009 season. The truck is now a total of 2,340 pounds less than it was before the 2009 season.

The pulling team and truck are officially sponsored by Mack Trucks, Inc.
