= Viru Keemia Grupp =

Company based in Estonia

- Industry: Oil shale industry Power generation
- Founded: 1924
- Headquarters: Kohtla-Järve, Ida-Virumaa
- Key people: Ahti Asmann (CEO)
- Products: 680,000 tons of shale oil, 900 GWh energy production (2023)
- Number of employees: 1500 (2024)
- Website: www.vkg.ee

Viru Keemia Grupp is a private Estonian large-scale industrial enterprise. It focuses on oil shale mining, shale oil, combined heat and power production and production and marketing of fine chemical products.

Viru Keemia Grupp is located in Kohtla-Järve and continues the Estonian oil shale valorisation tradition that started in 1924. The company is based on private capital since 1997 when AS Kiviter was privatised. ^{[1]}

== History ==
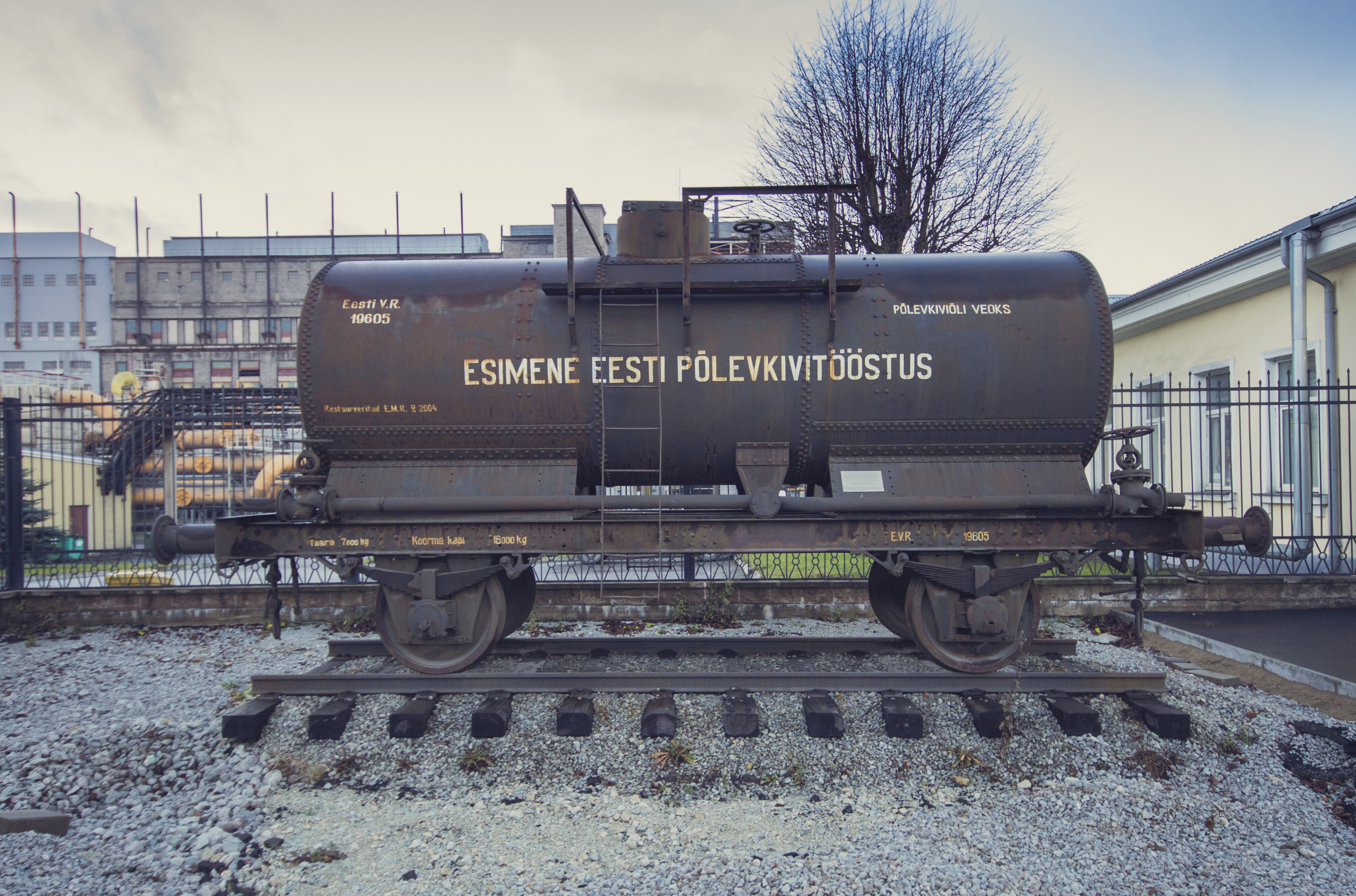
A VKG tanker showing the pre-1940 name

Estonia’s oil shale industry is a traditional Estonian industry, founded during the country's first period of independence. Local oil shale industry provided heat and light to Estonian households starting from 1924, and supplied household gas to Leningrad and Tallinn as well as other Northern Estonian towns. The list of products made in Kohtla-Järve through decades is rich and varied – from shale oil to fine chemicals, epoxy resins to nitrogen fertilisers, hair dye components to bitumens.

== Operations ==
VKG's two main areas of operations are shale oil extraction, and electricity and heat production and distribution.

=== Shale oil production ===
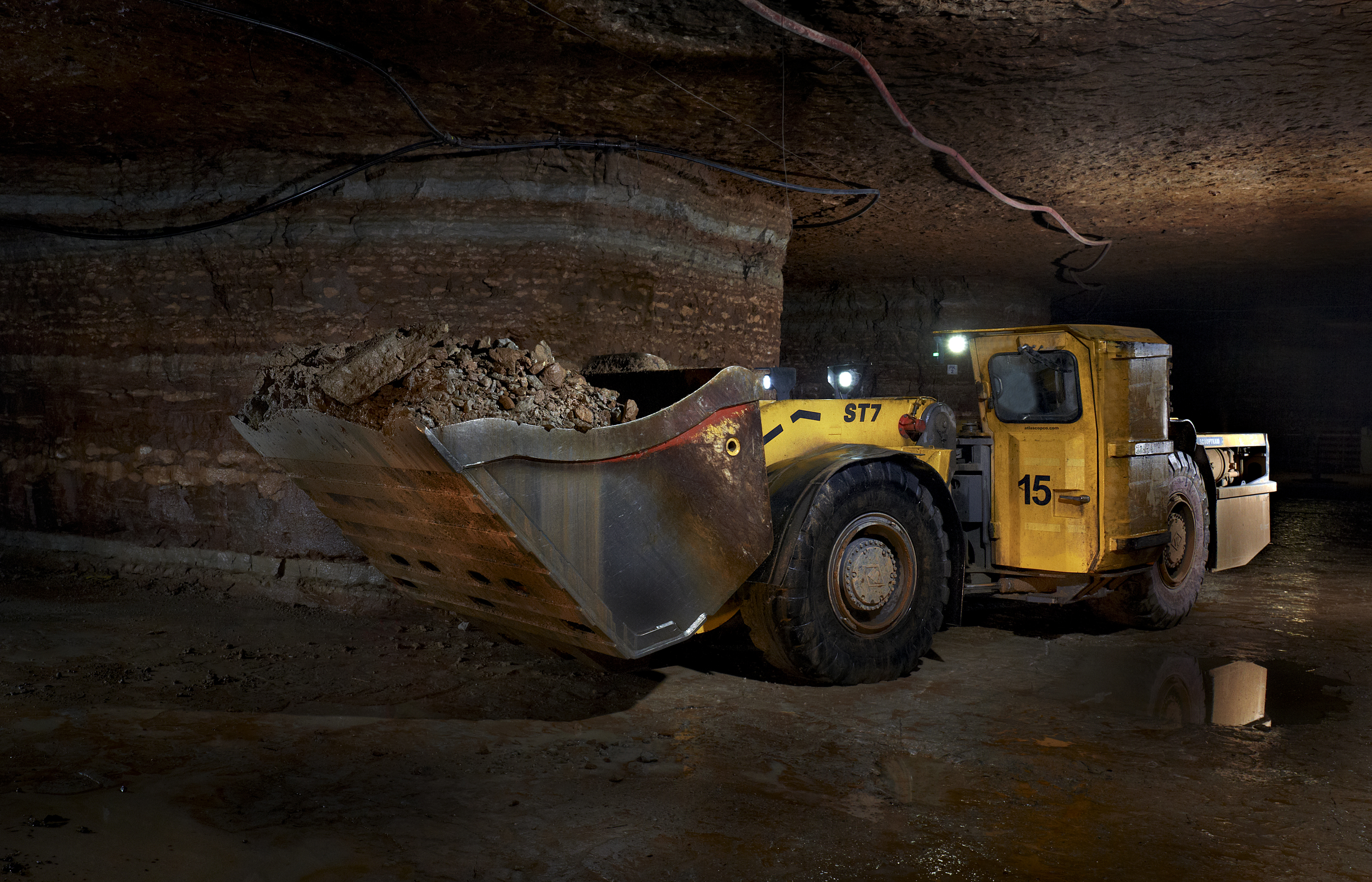
VKG Ojamaa mine

The subsidiary producing shale oil is VKG Oil. The company utilizes two different processes: Kiviter and Galoter. The company also tested but rejected the Alberta Taciuk Process. In total, VKG Oil processes 2 million tons of oil shale per year, producing 250,000 tons of shale oil.

The company operates several Kiviter retorts, the largest of them having a processing capacity of 40 tonnes per hour of oil shale feedstock. As of 2016, these retorts were out of operation due to low oil prices. It also operates three Galoter-type retorts called Petroter. Engineering of the retort was done by Atomenergoproject of Saint Petersburg; engineering of the condensation and distillation plant was done by Rintekno of Finland. The first Petroter plant has a processing capacity of 1.1 million tonnes of oil shale per year, and it produces 100,000 tonnes of shale oil, 30 million cubic metres (1.1 billion cubic feet) of oil shale gas, and 150 GWh of steam per year.

=== Power generation and distribution ===
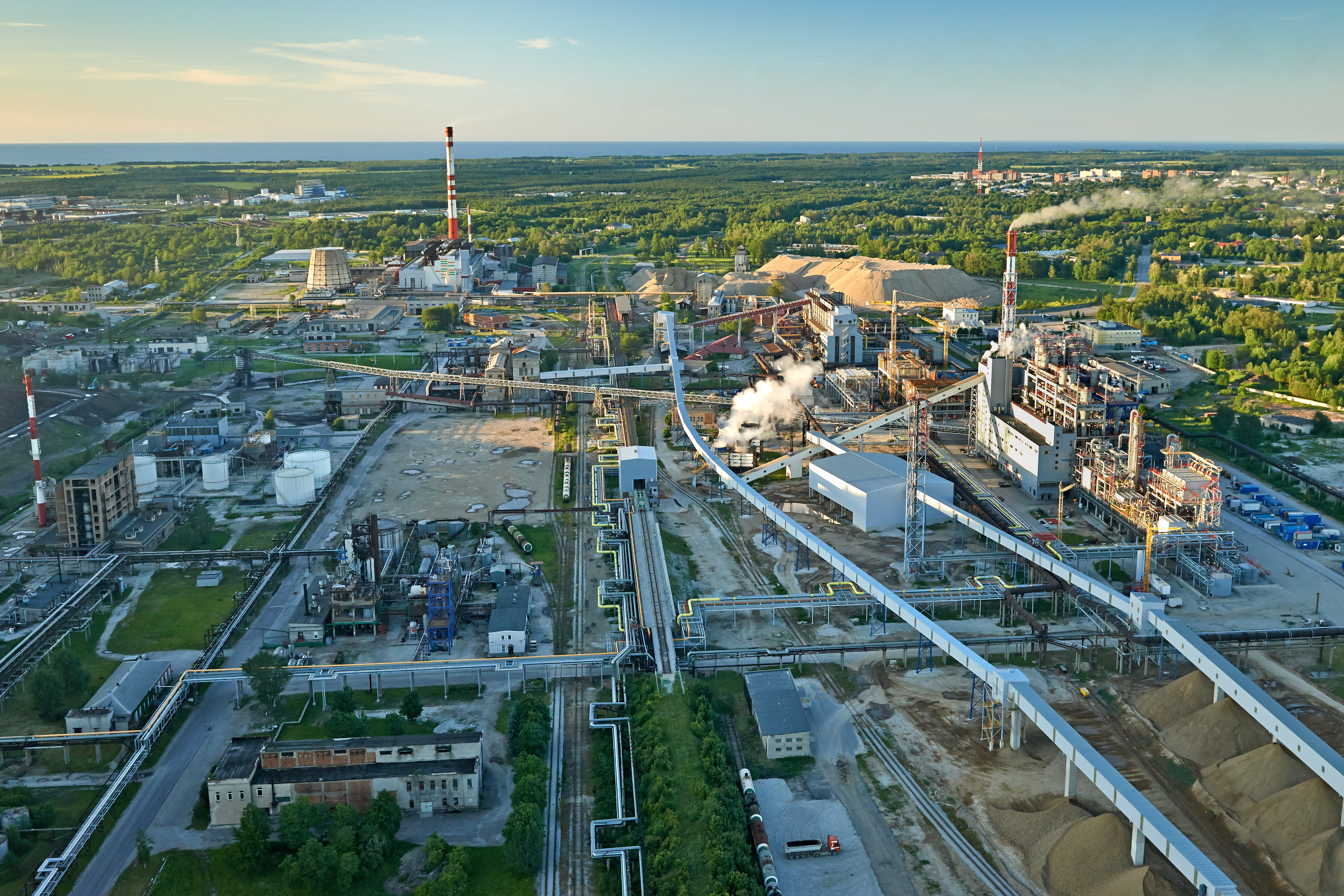
VKG Energia

VKG's subsidiary VKG Energia, a power and heat generation company, was established in 2004 after VKG bought the Kohtla-Järve Power Plant and the Kohtla-Järve heat distribution system from Kohtla-Järve Soojus. In 2005, it bought another power plant in Kohtla-Järve from Fortum Termest. In 2006, VKG bought a 40.8% stake in Kohtla-Järve Soojus, an operator of the Ahtme Power Plant, and in 2010 it took a full control of the company, now VKG Soojus. All generations capacities were transferred to VKG Energia while VKG Soojus is responsible for heat distribution. VKG Energia has installed electrical capacity of 80 MW and heat capacity of 700 MW.

In July 2006, VKG acquired Narva Elektrivõrk, the second-largest power distribution company in Estonia, and renamed it VKG Elektrivõrgud.

=== Other activities ===
In April 2011, VKG acquired assets of a bankrupt company Silbet Plokk that manufactured cinder blocks for construction from oil shale burning residue. The company was renamed VKG Plokk. The coalition-agreement of Jüri Ratas' second cabinet formed in 2019 between the Centre Party, EKRE and Pro Patria, expresses support to the development of the local oil industry. Therefore, VKG and Eesti Energia decided to initiate a cost-benefit study aimed at establishing an oil pre-refining plant in Ida-Viru County. The plant would require a 650 million euro investment.

== Subsidiaries ==
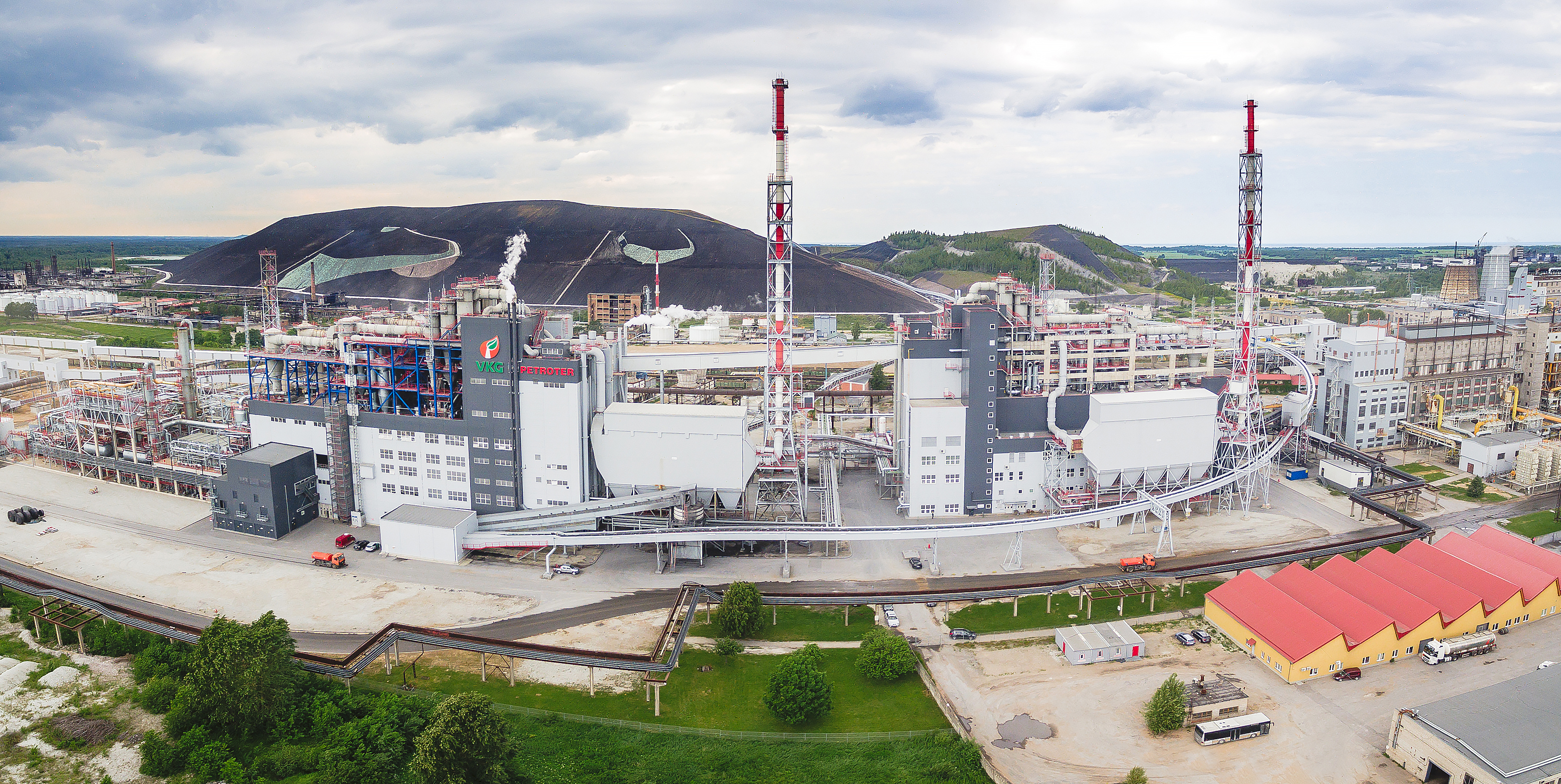
Viru Keemia Grupp

Main subsidiaries of VKG are:

- VKG Oil - shale oil producer
- Viru RMT – company producing, assembling and repairing metal structures, pipelines and pressure equipment
- VKG Transport – transportation company
- VKG Energia - heat and power generation company
- VKG Soojus – heat distribution company
- VKG Elektrivõrgud – electricity distribution company
- VKG Elektriehitus – construction of power systems
- VKG Kaevandused – oil shale mining
- VKG Plokk – production of cinder blocks
- OOO Slantsehim (73.4%) – developer of Boltysh oil shale deposit in Ukraine

== See also ==
- Energy in Estonia

== Bibliography ==
- Aaloe, Aasa; Bauert, Heikki; Soesoo, Alvar (2007). Kukersite oil shale (PDF). Tallinn: GEOGuide Baltoscandia. ISBN 978-9985-9834-2-3.
- Holmberg, Rurik (2008). Survival of the Unfit. Path Dependence and the Estonian Oil Shale Industry (PDF). Linköping Studies in Arts and Science. Vol. 427. Linköping University.
- Ots, Arvo (2006) [2004]. Tyson, Toni; McQuillen, Mary (eds.). Oil Shale Fuel Combustion. Tallinn: Arvo Ots; Eesti Energia. ISBN 978-9949-13-710-7.
