= Sinara Transport Machines =

Rolling stock manufacturer

Sinara Transport Machines (CTM)
- Type: Open joint stock company
- Industry: Engineering – transportation
- Founded: 2007
- Headquarters: Yekaterinburg, Russia
- Key people: Vladimir P. Melnikov CEO
- Products: Railway locomotives, diesel engines
- Parent: Sinara Group
- Website: sinaratm.ru

Sinara Transport Machines (Russian: ОАО «Синара – Транспортные машины») is a Russian transportation vehicle manufacturing and engineering company based in Yekaterinburg. The company was established in 2007 as a division of the Sinara Group.

== Subsidiaries ==
The division incorporates the following subsidiaries:

- Trading House STM
- Ural Diesel Engine Plant
- Lyudinovsky Locomotive Plant
- Center for Innovation Development STM
- Kaluga Plant of Track Machines and Hydraulic Drives
- STM-Service
- SinaraPromTrans
- Ural Locomotives: a joint venture with Siemens created in 2010; manufacturing facilities were based at the Ural Railway Engineering Plant.

== STM research centre ==
The STM research centre (ООО Центр инновационного развития CТМ) was created in 2010 to develop new railway locomotives and technologies.
