= Lyudinovsky Locomotive Plant =

Lyudinovsky Locomotive Plant (Russian: Людиновский тепловозостроительный завод) is a plant in Lyudinovsky founded in 1745. In 2007 the works became part of Sinara Transport Machines.

As of 2010 it produces shunting locomotives with both hydraulic transmission: TGM3B (ТГМ4Б) and TGM6A (ТГМ6Д), and electrical transmission: TEM7A (ТЭМ7А) and TEM9 (ТЭМ9).

== History ==
The construction of a plant called the Lyudinovo Ironworks was started in 1732 by Nikita Nikitovich Demidov, son of a Tula armourer and manufacturer, on the basis of the iron ore deposits in Jizdra. Completed in 1745. The factory specialised in cast iron smelting and manufacture of simple metal products.

In 1820 Lyudinovo ironworks together with neighbouring villages and lands was bought by I.A.Maltsov. His son S. I. Maltsov changes the specialization of the enterprise. Since 1820 the plant starts producing transport and power machines. In 1841 the first rails for Nikolayevskaya railway were produced at the plant.

In 1844 construction of the first domestic steamships that later opened navigation on the Desna, Dnjepr and Volga rivers began. Since the second half of XIX century the plant became one of the centres of domestic steam locomotive building.

== Gallery ==
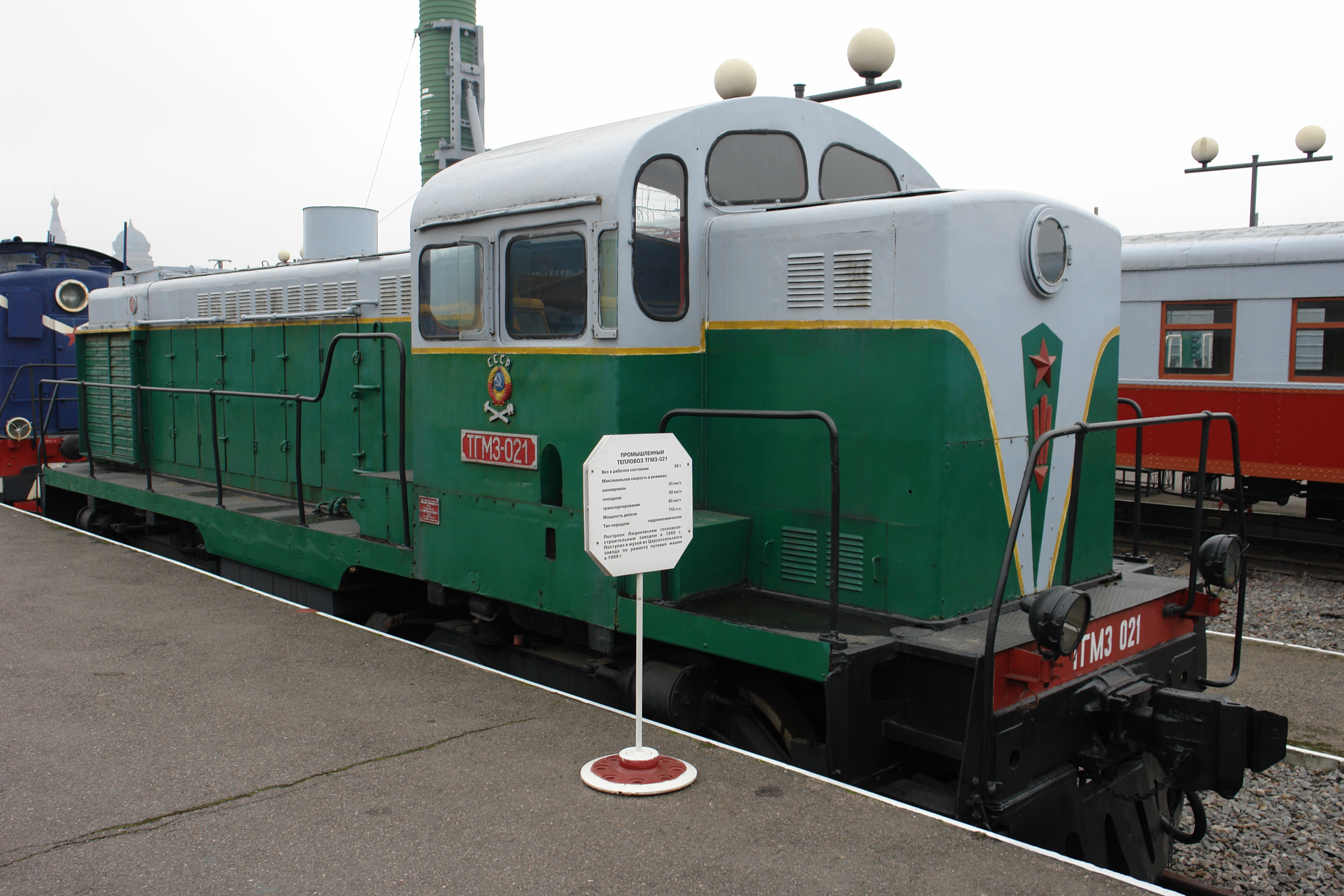
Industrial diesel locomotive TGM3 (1959-1977)

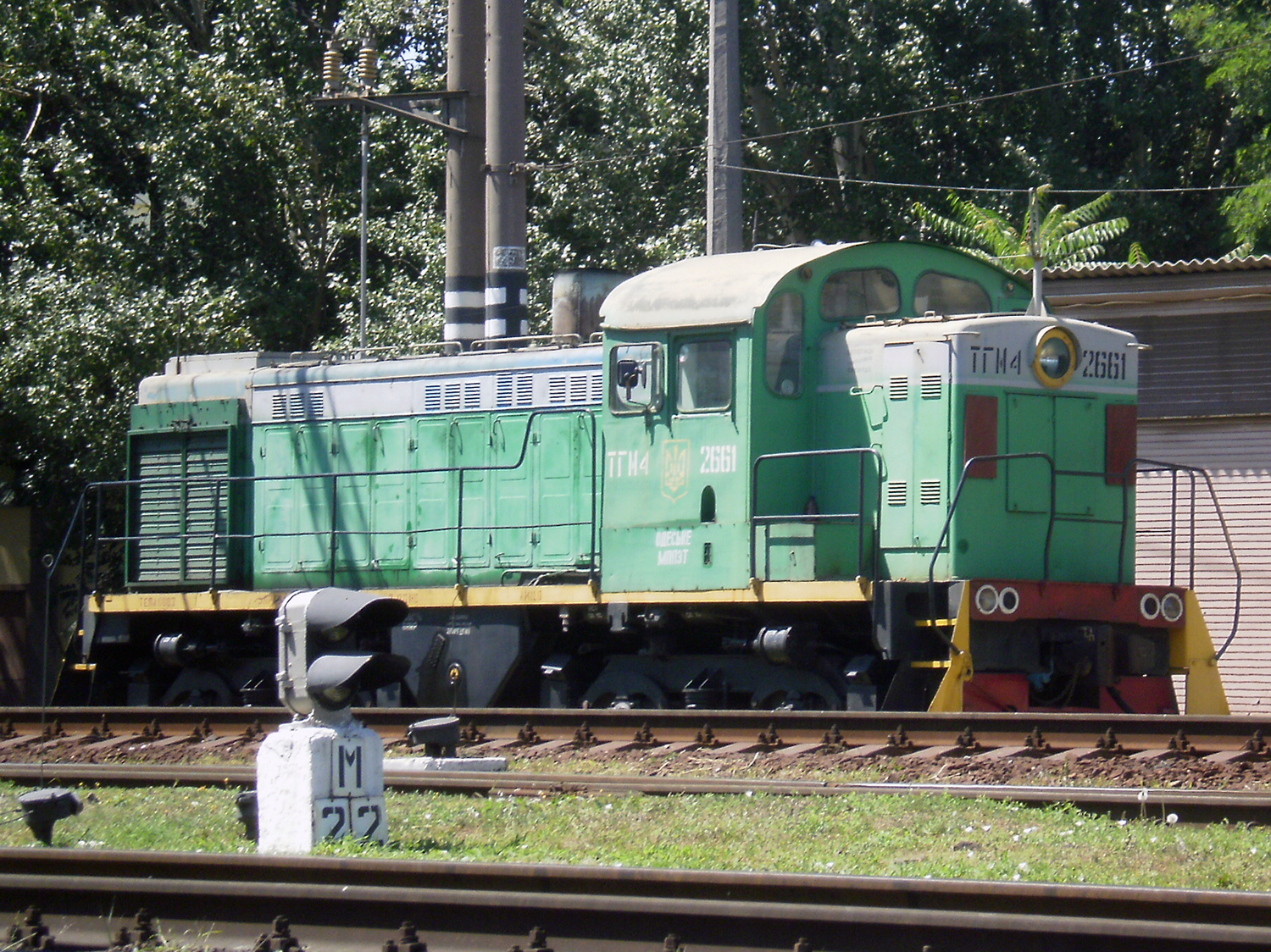
Four-axle diesel industrial locomotive with hydraulic transmission TGM4 (1971-current)

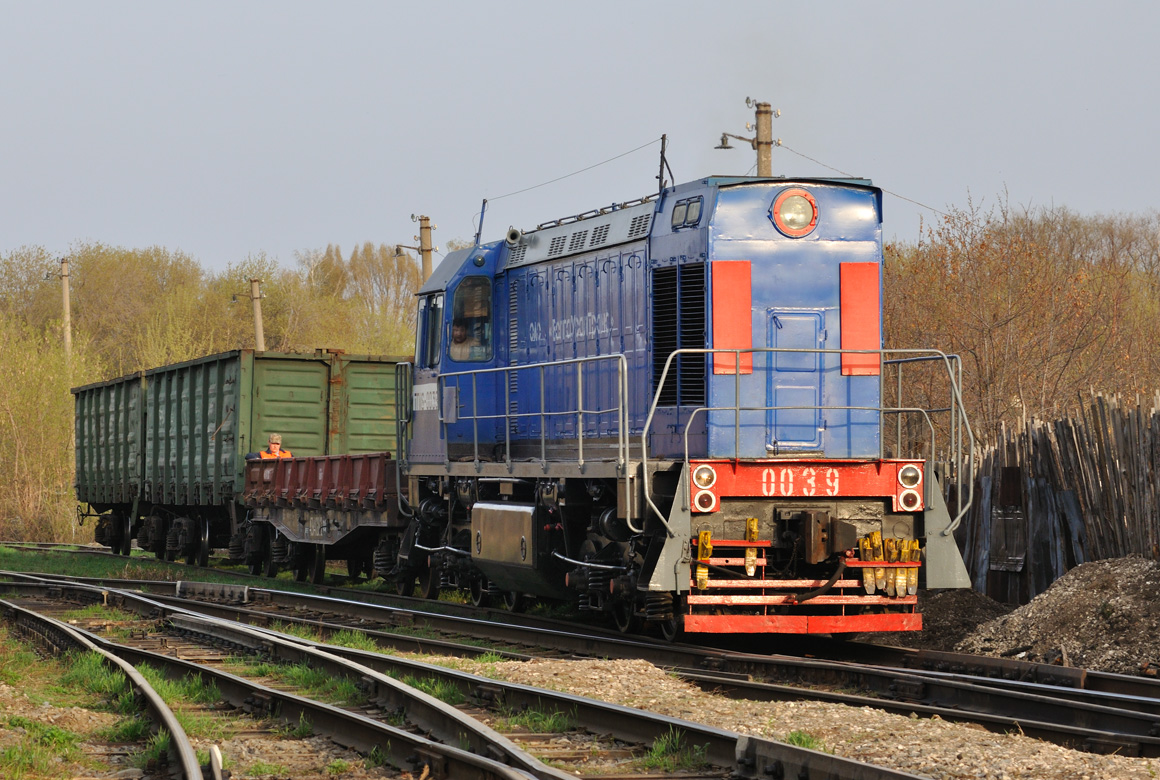
Four-axle diesel-hydraulic industrial locomotive TGM6 (1966-current)

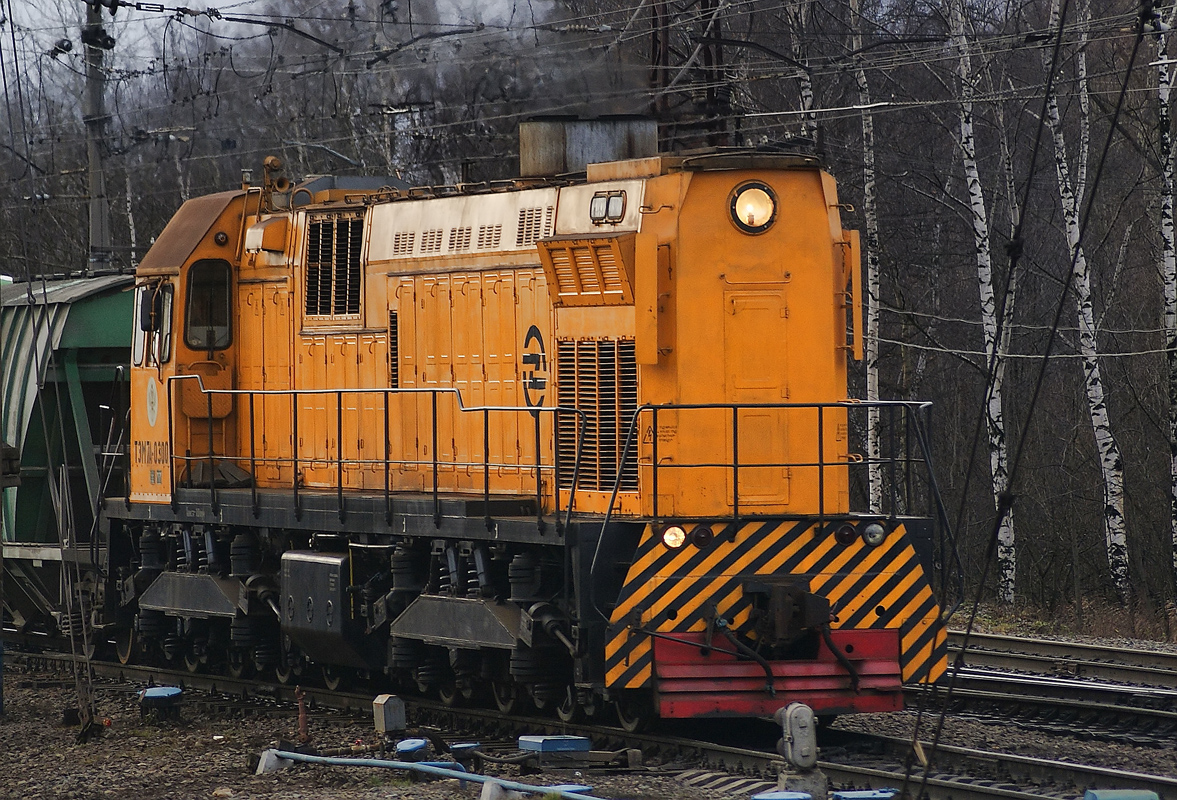
TEM7 (1976-current) -shunting locomotive with electric transmission changeable, DC, with the axial formula +20-20 20 20. The most powerful locomotive shunter, operates on the railways post-Soviet countries

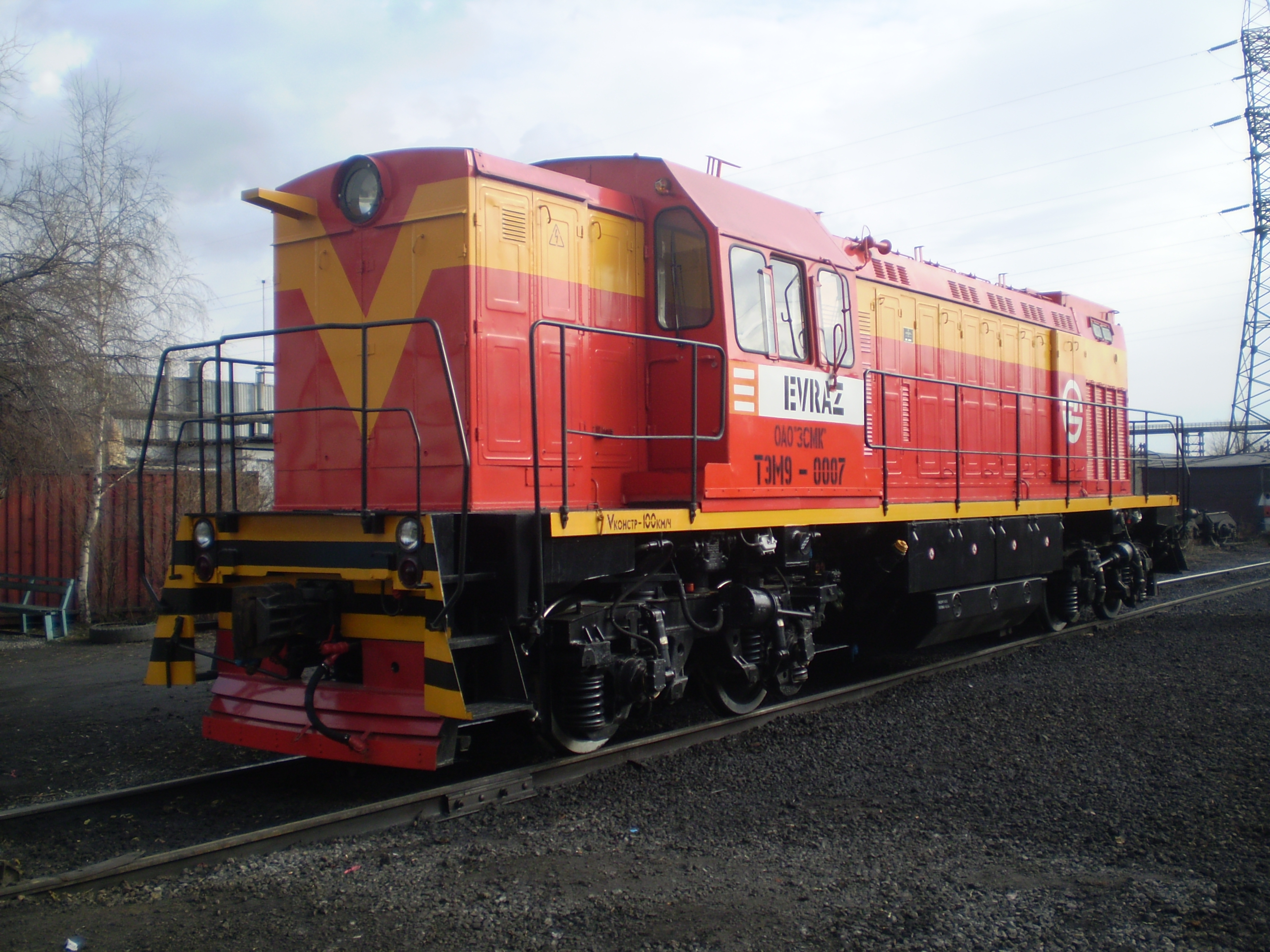
TEM9 (2009-current)- a four-axle export -shunting locomotive with electric transmission changeable, DC and individual drive wheel sets, intended for shunting and export work on the railways of 1520 mm of JSC "Russian Railways" and the industrial enterprises of ferrous and non-ferrous metallurgy, chemical industry, power industry, businesses industrial railway transportation, construction and other industries.
