= Ahtme Power Plant =

Power station in Estonia

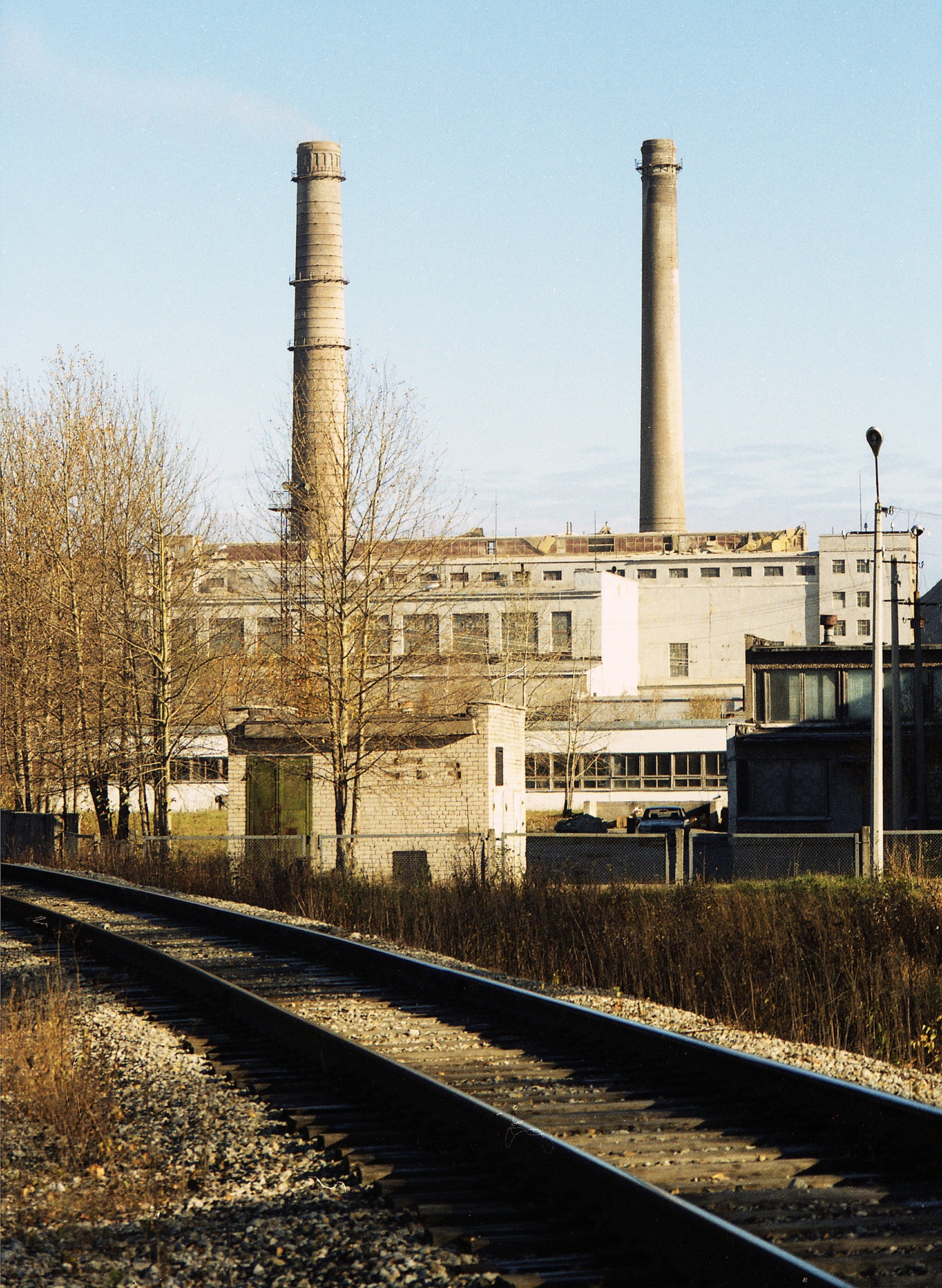
- Ahtme Power Plant in 1996
- Official name: Ahtme soojuselektrijaam
- Country: Estonia
- Location: Ahtme, Kohtla-Järve
- Coordinates: 59°18′50″N 27°27′52″E
- Status: Operational
- Construction began: 1951
- Commission date: 1953
- Decommission date: 1 January 2013
- Owner: Viru Keemia Grupp
- Operator: VKG Soojus

Thermal power station
- Primary fuel: Natural gas
- Cogeneration?: Yes

Power generation
- Units operational: 1 × 100 MWe
- Make and model: Sverdlovsk Turbine Works; VEB Görlitzer Maschinenbau
- Units decommissioned: 1 × 10 MWe; 1 × 20 MWe; 1 × 370 MWt
- Nameplate capacity: 100 MW

Ahtme Power Plant (Estonian: Ahtme soojuselektrijaam) was an oil shale-fired power plant in Ahtme, Kohtla-Järve, Estonia. It was owned by VKG Soojus, a subsidiary of Viru Keemia Grupp. Until the end of 2012, it supplied with heat Ahtme district of Kohtla-Järve and Jõhvi.

Construction of the 48 MW Ahtme Power Plant by Baltische Öl started in 1942 as a part of the larger oil-shale processing complex. To survive the war time air strikes, the plant was to be located below the ground. However, it was never finished and was destroyed by the retreating Germans.

The new plant was designed by AtomEnergoProekt. The first generator of the plant was commissioned on 28 October 1951 with the second generator following at the end of the same year. The first generator had a capacity of 22.5 MW. At the beginning the plant used Riley Stoker boilers and General Electric generators; however, boilers developed for the pulverized firing of coal and lignite were not fit to work on pulverized oil shale. The planned capacity of 72.5 MW which made it the most powerful power plant in Estonia until the commissioning of the Narva Power Plants, was reached only at the end of the 1950s.

Originally the main task of the plant was to provide electricity and heat to the nearby Ahtme oil shale mine and other oil shale industries. Later it started to heat Ahtme and Jõhvi towns. After commissioning of the Narva Power Plants the importance of the Ahtme Power Plant as an electricity producer decreased and it was mainly utilized as a heating plant. Correspondingly, the electrical capacity of the plant was decreased. Since 2000, the plant has installed capacity of 30 MW of electricity and 370 MW of heat. It is equipped with three Barnaul BKZ-75-39F middle-pressure boilers and two Bukkau type boilers, one 20 MW Sverdlovsk and one 10 MW VEB Görlitzer Maschinenbau AT-25-2 turbine.

Before closure of the Ahtme oil shale mine, oil shale for the power plant was supplied from there. As a start up fuel, the plant used shale oil. Its cooling water was piped from Lake Konsu, located 12 kilometres (7.5 mi) southeast. Oil shale ash was dumped in the nearby ash field. Ash was transported in closed the system by pumping ash and water mixture to the depository field. Closure of the ash landfill was supported from the European Union Cohesion Fund. Part of oil shale ash was used to produce cinder blocks at the Ahtme building materials factory.

On 1 January 2013 the plant was closed due to EU environmental regulations. In March 2011, a 100 MW natural gas-fired boiler house for peak and back-up loads was commissioned, which continues operating after closure of the old power plant.

== See also ==
- Energy in Estonia
