= Lake Konsu =

Lake in Estonia

- Konsu järv (Estonian)
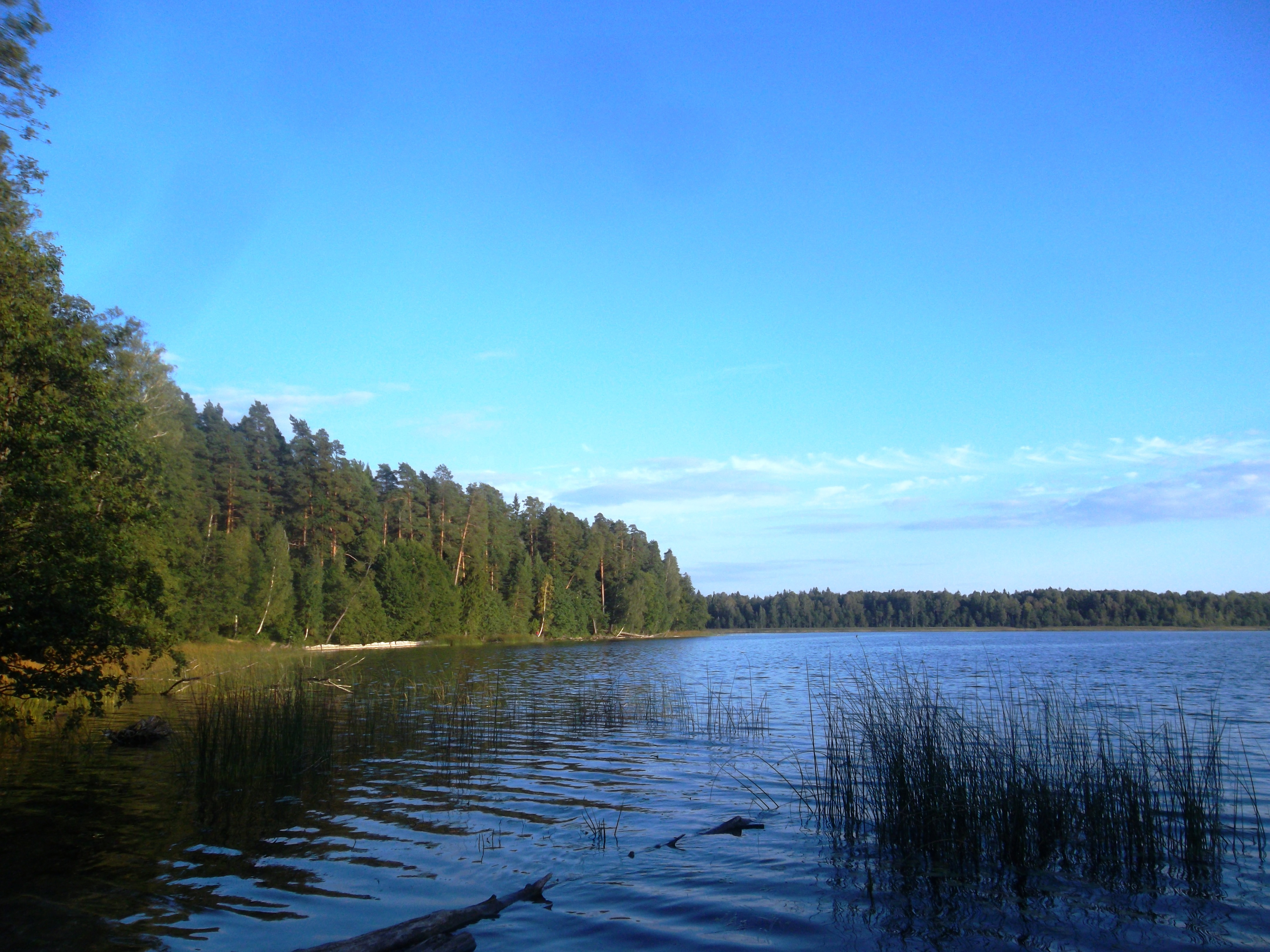

- Location within Estonia
- Coordinates: 59°13′N 27°34′E
- Basin countries: Estonia
- Max. length: 2,130 meters (6,990 ft)
- Surface area: 150.0 hectares (371 acres)
- Average depth: 4.8 meters (16 ft)
- Max. depth: 11.0 meters (36.1 ft)
- Water volume: 7,214,000 cubic meters (254,800,000 cu ft)
- Shore length^{1}: 9,710 meters (31,860 ft)
- Surface elevation: 40.7 meters (134 ft)
- ^{1} Shore length is not a well-defined measure.

Lake Konsu (Estonian: Konsu järv, also Konsa järv, Kontsu järv, Kontso järv, Suur Kongojärv, or Suur Konsu järv) is a lake in Estonia. It is located in the village of Konsu in Alutaguse Parish, Ida-Viru County. The water of Lake Konsu is piped to the Ahtme Power Plant, 12 kilometers (7.5 mi) to the northwest, where it is used as cooling water.

== Physical description ==
The lake has an area of 150.0 hectares (371 acres). The lake has an average depth of 4.8 meters (16 ft) and a maximum depth of 11.0 meters (36.1 ft). It is 2,130 meters (6,990 ft) long, and its shoreline measures 9,710 meters (31,860 ft). It has a volume of 7,214,000 cubic meters (254,800,000 cu ft).

== See also ==
- List of lakes of Estonia
