= Zvezda M503 =

Marine diesel radial engine

The Zvezda M503 (built at AO Zvezda at St Petersburg) is a maritime 7 bank, 42-cylinder diesel inline radial engine built in the 1970s by the Soviet Union. Its primary use was in Soviet missile boats that used three of these engines and is in Russian e.g. Karakurt-class corvette.

This engine may have had other applications, but due to its extreme weight (5,400 kg (11,900 lb)), it would have been limited to ground or naval use.

A German tractor pulling team designed a vehicle, named "Dragon Fire", around a methanol-fueled version of this engine; this modified engine is said to weigh 3,200 kg (7,100 lb) including the gearbox, for use in the 4.5 ton tractor pulling class, making 8160 PS (6 MW) at 2,500 rpm.

== Specifications (Zvezda M503A) ==
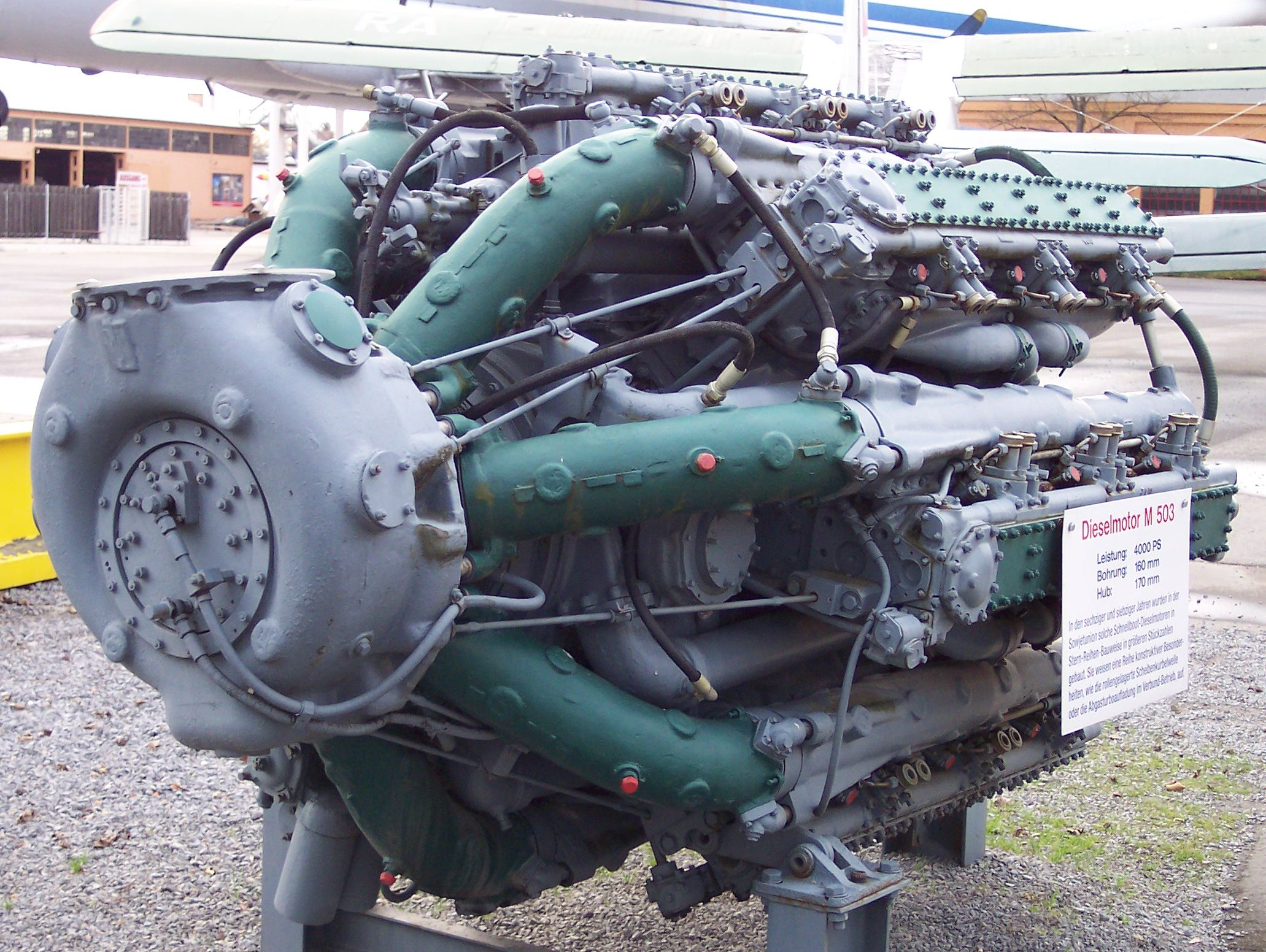
Zvezda M503

=== General characteristics ===
- Type: 42-cylinder liquid-cooled,
  six-cylinder-per-bank seven-bank, diesel radial engine
- Bore: 6.3 in (160 mm)
- Stroke: 6.7 in (170 mm)
- Displacement: 8,760.5 cu in (143.559 L)
- Length: 145.66 in (3,700 mm)
- Diameter: 61.41 in (1,560 mm)
- Dry weight: 12,015 lb (5,450 kg)

=== Components ===
- Valvetrain: 7 overhead cam shafts,
  one per bank (SOHC).
- Fuel type: Diesel fuel
- Cooling system: Liquid-cooled

=== Performance ===
- Power output: 3,942 bhp (2,940 kW; 3,997 PS)
  at 2,200 rpm
- Specific power: 0.450 hp/in^{3} (20.47 kW/L)
- Power-to-weight ratio: 0.32 hp/lb (0.53 kW/kg)

== Zvezda engines ==
AO Zvezda

- Zvezda M503, M533, M520 B
- Zvezda M504 56 cylinders
- Zvezda M401 V12 marine turbodiesel engine
- Zvezda M150 Pulsar V12 800 kW < 1,8 - 3 MW
- ZE1600KZ ZE Energetika 4,8 MW V8 V12 < 3 - 5 or 7 MW
- Zvezda M507 2 × 56 = 112 cylinders
- Zvezda M501

KMZ RD production

- ADG1000 ADG6000, 68B 68G, 85D 86B 86G at KMZ - RD and UDMZ
- TM-300 inline 6 (460 hp 200 350 kW) or 8
- various V12 V16 and V18 from 3 5 MW 58D/A/E up to 8 9 MW
- 68B, 68G, 85D 86B 86G 8,8 MW V18

== Comparable engines ==
- Napier Deltic
