= Tractor pulling =

Motorsport competition form

Modified tractor with three 1500 hp V8 engines

Allis Chalmers diesel pulling tractor

John Deere pulling tractor

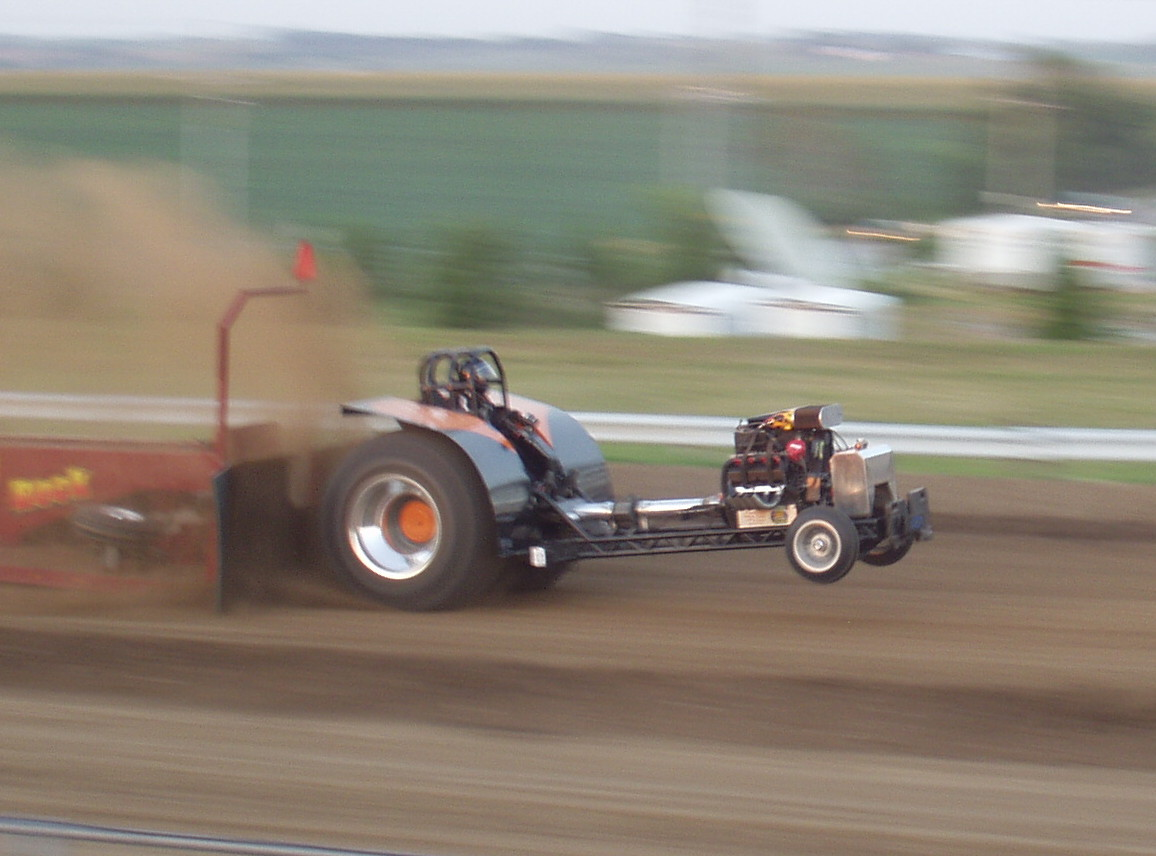
Light Modified (5,700 lb) class tractor, Weeping Water, Nebraska

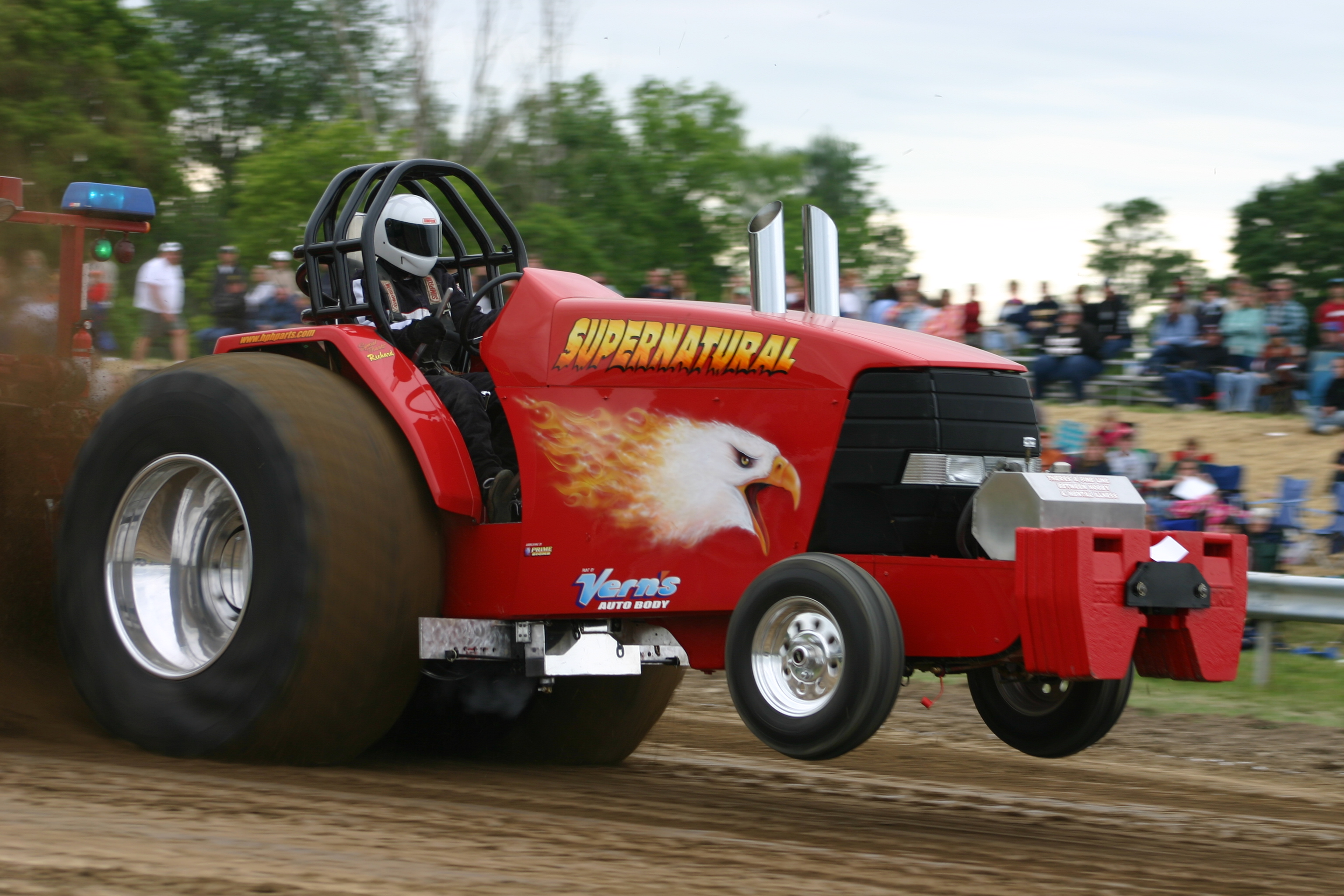
Super Stock class tractor, Fonda, New York

Truck pulling
A truck pulling at the 2011 Mackville Nationals — 1.43MB

Truck and tractor pulling, also known as power pulling, is a form of a motorsport competition in which antique or modified tractors pull a heavy drag or sled along an 11-meter-wide (35 ft), 100-meter-long (330 ft) track, with the winner being the tractor that pulls the drag the farthest. The sport is known as the world's most powerful motorsport, due to the multi-engined modified tractor pullers.

All tractors in their respective classes pull a set weight in the drag. When a tractor gets to the end of the 100 meter track, this is known as a "full pull". When more than one tractor completes the course, more weight is added to the drag, and those competitors that moved past 91 metres (300 ft) will compete in a pull-off; the winner is the one who can pull the drag the farthest. The drag is known as a weight transfer drag. This means that, as it is pulled down the track, the weight is transferred (linked with gears to the drag’s wheels) from over the rear axles and towards the front of the drag. In front of the rear wheels, instead of front wheels, there is a "pan". This is essentially a metal plate, and as the weight moves toward it, the resistance between the pan and the ground builds. The farther the tractor pulls the drag, the more difficult it gets.

Tractor pulling originated from pre-Industrial Era horse pulling competitions in which farmers would compete with one another to see whose teams of draft horses could pull a heavy load over the longest distance. The first known competitions using motorized tractors were held in 1929 in Missouri and Kentucky. Tractor pulling became popular in rural areas across the Midwestern and Southern United States in the 1950s and 1960s. From there it gradually spread to Canada, Europe, and Australia and New Zealand.

== History in the US ==
Prior to the invention of the tractor, when farm implements were pulled by horses, farmers would boast about the strength of their teams and seek to compare and contest in teams with one another to see who had the most powerful animals. In some cases, they compared horse teams pulling large loads over distance, such as a fully loaded hay cart or wagon. In other situations, a flat board or skid would have a horse or team of horses then hitched to it; weight would be added, usually in the form of rocks, and the driver would urge his horses to pull the load, with more weight added as competitors were eliminated; the animals pulling the most weight or for the greatest distance were judged the strongest. These events became the formalized sport of horse pulling, which is still carried out today with draft horses, specially bred to have high strength for pulling heavy loads. Today, fixed weights on drags are dragged for a set distance and additional weight is added in successive rounds. While it is said that the term horsepower is derived from this event, the concept was developed earlier, in experiments and measurements performed by James Watt and Mason Worrell.

It wasn't until 1929 that motorized vehicles were put to use in the first events at Bowling Green, Missouri, and Vaughansville, Ohio. Although the sport was recognized then, it did not really become popular until the '50s and '60s. It was also realized, at that time, there were no uniform set of rules. The rules varied from state to state, county to county, and competitors never knew what standards to follow. This made the sport difficult for new entrants.

In 1969, representatives from eight states congregated to create a uniform book of rules to give the sport much-needed structure, and created the National Tractor Pullers Association (NTPA). The NTPA's early years were events that used standard farm vehicles, with the motto "Pull on Sunday, plow on Monday". Pulling remained basically the same through the '70s, with only stock and modified tractors. Stock tractors were commercially available tractors produced by manufacturers, and modified tractors were the basic tractor chassis with another non-tractor engine mounted on it.

Tractors remained single-engined until two Ohio brothers, Carl and Paul Bosse, introduced the crossbox, which could allow multiple engines to be attached to a single driveshaft. Other innovators during this period included Bruce Hutcherson, with his triple-Rodeck-engine–powered "Makin Bacon Special", Dave and Ralph Banter and their Chevrolet-powered tractors, and the "Mission Impossible" tractors of Tim Engler, which at one point had up to seven supercharged methanol-fueled engines.

Subsequently, modified tractors with four engines were common, while stock tractors tried to catch up by adding multiple large turbochargers, along with intercoolers, but both retained the appearance of a tractor. Soon tractors became single-use machines that were not used on the farm, making the "Pull on Sunday, plow on Monday" motto obsolete.

Throughout the '70s and '80s the modified division continued to thrill crowds by adding more engines, and soon the tractors lost their tractor appearance and turned into high 'spec' dragsters. The limit was reached in 1988 when a tractor with seven engines was built. As well as piston engines, turbine engines (frequently mistakenly called "jet engines") appeared in 1974, with Gardner Stone's "General" Tractor, a four-turboshaft unit hitting the hook in 1989.

The growing popularity of the sport caused the creation of a new four-wheel–drive division in 1976, which captured a large fan base. The engine sizes in these vehicles continued to increase, from 7,400 cubic centimeters (450 cu in) up to 11,000 cubic centimeters (700 cu in) and probably would have continued, but in 1989 the NTPA limited displacement to 10,700 cubic centimetres (650 cu in) and required natural aspiration, banning supercharging. Today the four-wheel–drive division is one of the most popular with the success of trucks like the Holman Brothers "4-Play" Chevy and Bob Boden's "Studley Studebaker".

=== Two-wheel-drive (2WD) truck class ===
The two-wheel–drive (2WD) division was introduced in 1983.

The division imposes a weight limit of 2,800 kilograms (6,200 lb) on each competing truck, a maximum width of 2.4 meters (8 ft), and a maximum distance of 4.6 meters (15 ft) from the centerline of the rear axle to the front of the vehicle (including weight racks and tow hook). (The length restriction allows for up to 250 millimeters (10 in) of cosmetic fiberglass, however.)

Alcohol methane engines with up to eight cylinders are permitted, but diesel engines are not. Any wheelbase is permitted.

The National Tractor Pullers Association restricts engines to 9,420 cm^{3} (575 cu in) and two valves per cylinder. They permit tubular steel frames. The maximum tire size for the 2WD class is 470 mm × 410 mm (18.4 in × 16.1 in), with a maximum circumference of 3,600 mm (143 in) when mounted on an 460-millimeter (18 in) rim and inflated to 190 kilopascals (28 psi). The ground patch is not to exceed 480 millimeters (19 in) on original tread.

=== Super stock, pro-stock, and mini-modified ===
Super Stock tractor Open class uses primarily methanol fuel (some are diesel versions). The Super Stock Open machines can generate over 4,400 kilowatts (6,000 PS) and 5,400 newton-meters (4,000 lbf⋅ft) of torque, with billet or re-cast engine blocks. Super Stock Open and Super Stock Diesel tractors may use up to four turbochargers in three stages. The Diesel super stock tractors generate close to 3,700 kilowatts (5,000 PS) and 8,100 newton-metres (6,000 lbf⋅ft) of torque and are allowed to compete in the Open class, which very rarely occurs anymore. However, a true Open (methanol fuel) tractor is not allowed to compete in the Diesel class.

There is light Super Stock class which is 2,800 kilograms (6,200 lb) and the Heavy Super Stock Classes that are 3,630–3,740 kilograms (8,000–8,250 lb).

Diesel Pro Stock Tractors are limited to one turbocharger and diesel fuel is the only allowable source for power, in keeping with the 'spirit' of the original tractors. The maximum engine displacement is 11,100 cubic centimeters (680 cu in). These engines can achieve around 2,700 kilowatts (3,700 PS) and 7,500 newton-meters (5,500 lbf⋅ft) of torque. In recent years, new classes have been created to appeal to different groups of pullers. There is now a class called Limited Pro Stock that is limited to 10,500 cm^{3} (640 cu in) engine and 100 millimeters (4.1 in) turbocharger. This class typically pulls at 4,200–4,300 kilograms (9,300–9,500 lb) and is slightly restricted, as opposed to the Pro Stock class, which can run up to 11,100 cm^{3} (680 cu in) engine and an unrestricted size turbocharger, along with intercoolers.

The latest addition to Pro Stocks is the Light Pro Stock Class that typically pulls 3,800–3,900 kilograms (8,300–8,600 lb) depending on location. These tractors are limited to 8,800 cm^{3} (540 cu in) engines but can run any size turbo. They are not allowed to run intercoolers, however these tractors are making an average of 1,800–2,100 kilowatts (2,500–2,800 PS). The light overall weight makes this a driver's class as significant skill is required to keep the tractor on the track.

The mini-modified class is a highly specialized and custom built tractor to be fitted with a naturally aspirated engine, at minimum. NTPA Minis are limited to 9,420 cm^{3} (575 cu in) (always an aftermarket V-8 engine block) and uses up to a 14-71 hi helix supercharger. With the driver, they weigh only 930 kilograms (2,050 lb). Today's engine is capable of a minimum of 1,800 kilowatts (2,500 PS) on methanol or ethanol. Their reputation is known as the wildest ride in pulling, as naturally it is a very high horsepower to weight ratio. Whereas, their larger counterparts, the Modifieds, will weigh 2,700, 3,400 and 3,600 kilograms (6,000, 7,500 and 8,000 lb), utilizing the same engine that a Mini has, but, with multiple powerplants per custom built tractor chassis. Usually, a maximum of five engines is all that will make the 3,600 kilograms (8,000 lb) weight limit. Nitromethane and oxidizers were outlawed in 1976.

== Antique tractor pulling ==
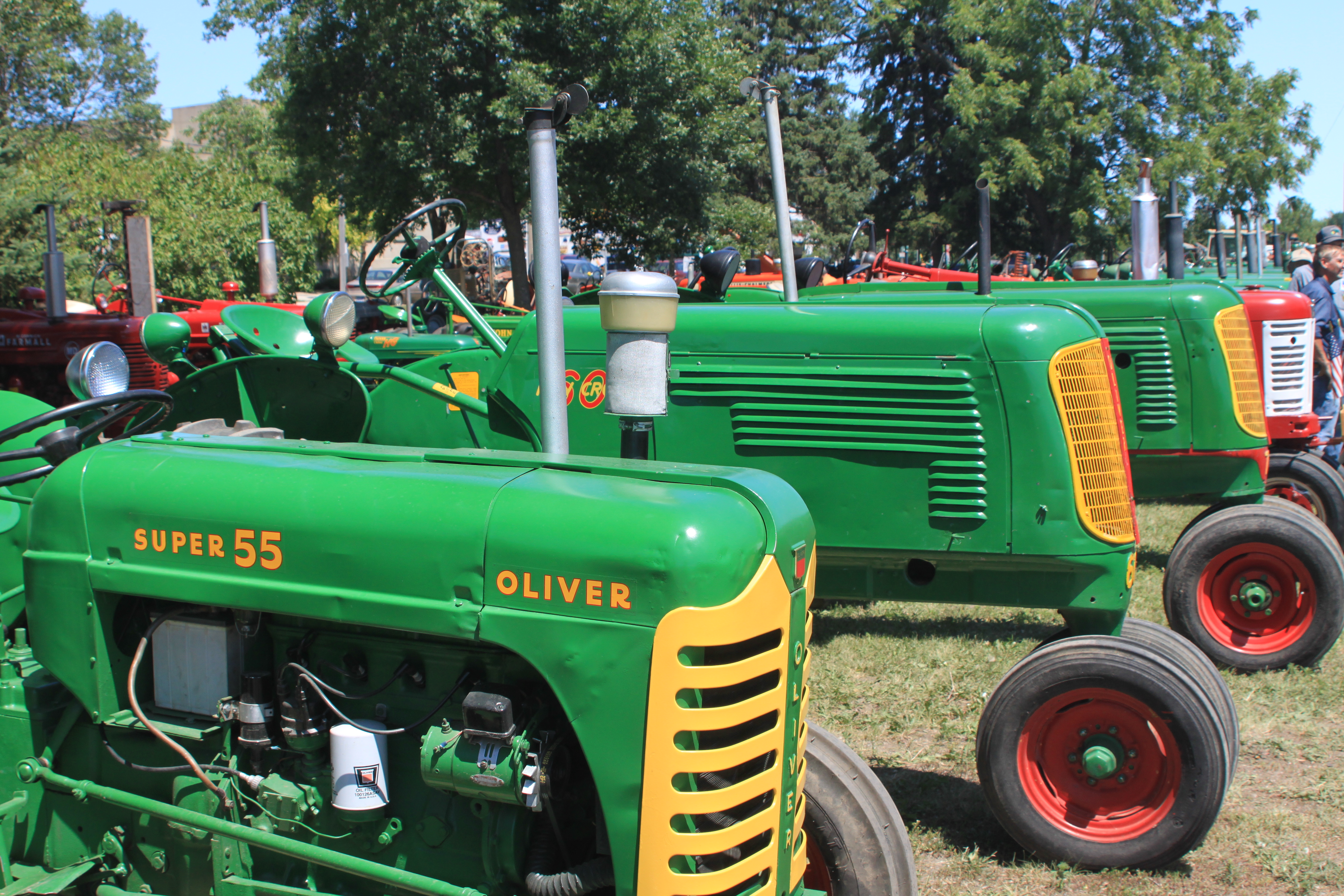
Oliver antique tractor

Antique tractor pulling is how tractor pulling first got started (although the tractors were just modern tractors at that time). As early as 1929, farmers began attaching their tractors to drags, and dragging it down a field to see who could pull it the furthest. People who were event organizers at Bowling Green, Missouri and Vaughansville, Ohio found out farmers were doing this and that it drew spectators. By 1950, county fairs across the country started featuring tractor pulls. Spectators found it fascinating to see machines that would "Pull on Sunday, plow on Monday". At first competitors would use a ‘Human Drag’, meaning a drag that was weighted by humans, different people would be added as the tractor made it down the track. However, organizers began to look at different ways to add weight to the drag, as spectators walking on the drag while moving proved to be a hazard. In the late 60s, a weight-exchanging drag was created, the drag that was created was basically a flatbed truck trailer with wheels near the back and a drag at the front. A mass that is moveable of up to 65,000 pounds or 29,000 kilograms, the mass starts at the back of the sled, slowly working its way up to the top as the drag moves down the track.

The tractors are divided into different weight classes based on the tractor weight, the weight classes starting at 2,500 and ending at 14,000 pounds (1,100 to 6,400 kg). The tractors could go in any class they choose, with many adding weight for the higher weighted classes. In order to be able to compete in Antique tractor pull competitions a tractor must perform at its original speed. Some pulling competitions will have a ‘dyno’, connecting the PTO shaft on the tractor to a dynamometer to test the horsepower. If a tractor shows it has more horsepower than the original tractor is supposed to have, it is placed into an alternate class called ‘Modified Tractors’.

Most antique tractors when pulling use about 14–15 pounds (6.4–6.8 kg) in their tires. There is also a drawbar rule, it is to be a minimum of two square inches (13 cm^{2}) in total steel at any point, as well must be rigid in all directions. The hitching device can be no more than 1 1/2-inch (38 mm) round stock (1 1/2 in or 38 mm square), or less than 1 1/8-inch (29 mm) round stock (1 in or 25 mm square), the hole has to be 3 by 3 3/4 inches (76 mm × 95 mm) diameter. The drawbar on a tractor should be no shorter than 18 inches (460 mm) from the center of the rear axle to the point of the hitch. All the weights on a tractor must be fixed. All drivers when pulling must remain seated.

== History in Australia ==
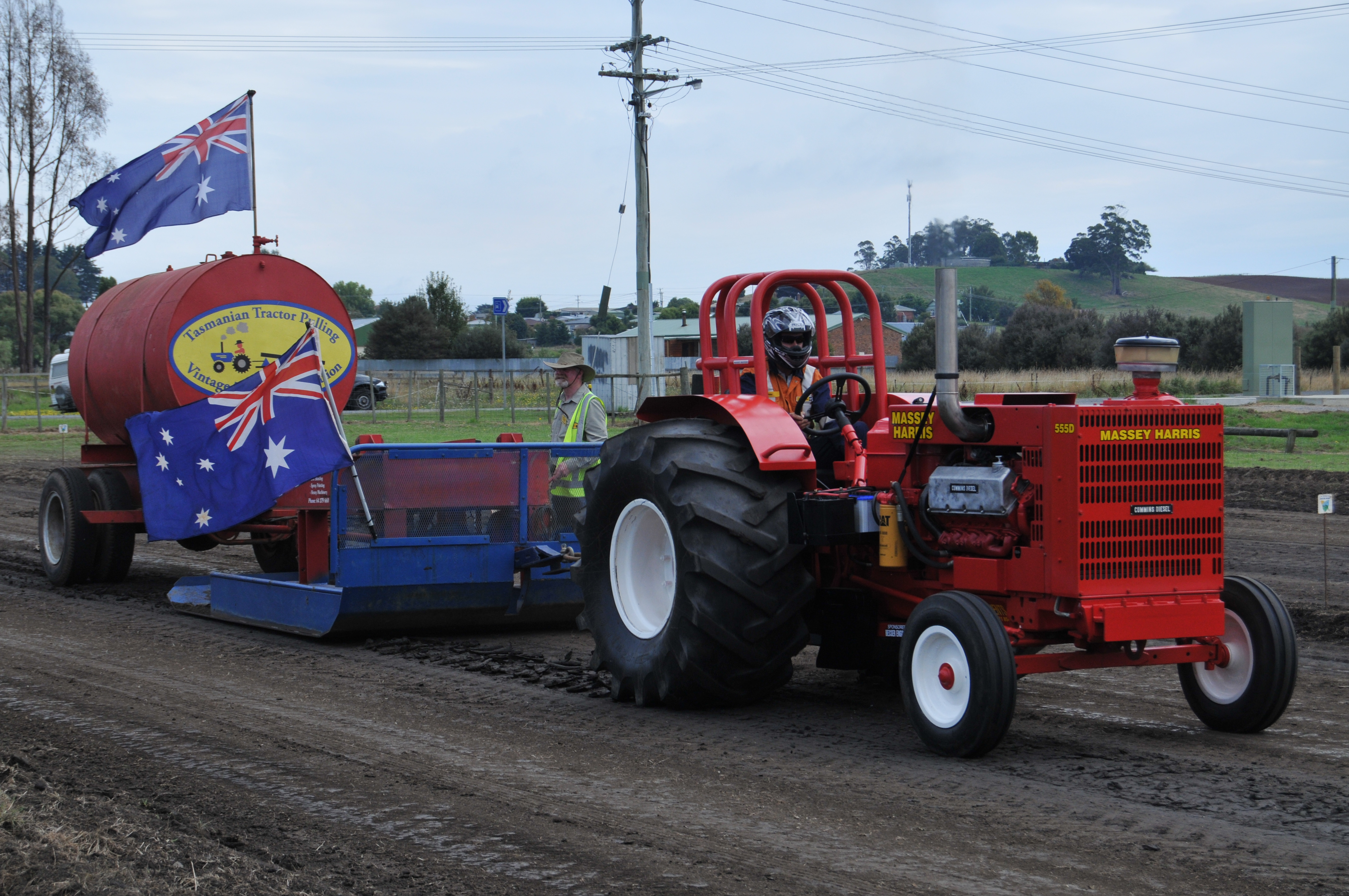
Tractor pull at Sheffield, Tasmania

The first Australian Tractor Pull was held at the Elmore Field Days (Victoria) in 1976. The following year saw Tractor Pulling begin in the Victorian rural town of Quambatook. It has developed over the years into a highly competitive and technical sport, where the difference between first and last place may be as small as one or two metres. Often the top tractors are separated by mere centimetres.

Down Under Modified Tractor Pulling Association (Down Under MTPA) is a non-profit organisation that governs Modified Tractor Pulling in Australia. Their events (Tractor Pulls) are held in conjunction with a promoter, often a community organisation (for example; Apex, Rotary or Lions clubs) or an agricultural show.

Down Under MTPA Tractor Pulls are held in locations throughout Australia, predominantly in Victoria, South Australia and New South Wales. In other regions, events are run by independent clubs and associations, including (South East Queensland) SEQ Pullers, (Central Queensland) CQ Pullers, the Western Australian Tractor Pullers Association (WATPA), and Tasmanian Tractor Pullers.

Australian Tractor Pulling classes include Open Modified, Super Modified, Limited Modified, Two Wheel Drive, Pro Stock / Open Pro Stock (Smoker), Open / Outlaw Mini Modified, Super Mini Modified, and Mini Modified. Each class is defined by limits on maximum weight, engine modifications, fuel type, and overall physical size.

Down Under MTPA also runs Junior Modified Pulling Mowers, a class for competitors aged 8 to 14. These Modified Mowers pull their own smaller version of the sled.

== Drag pulling ==
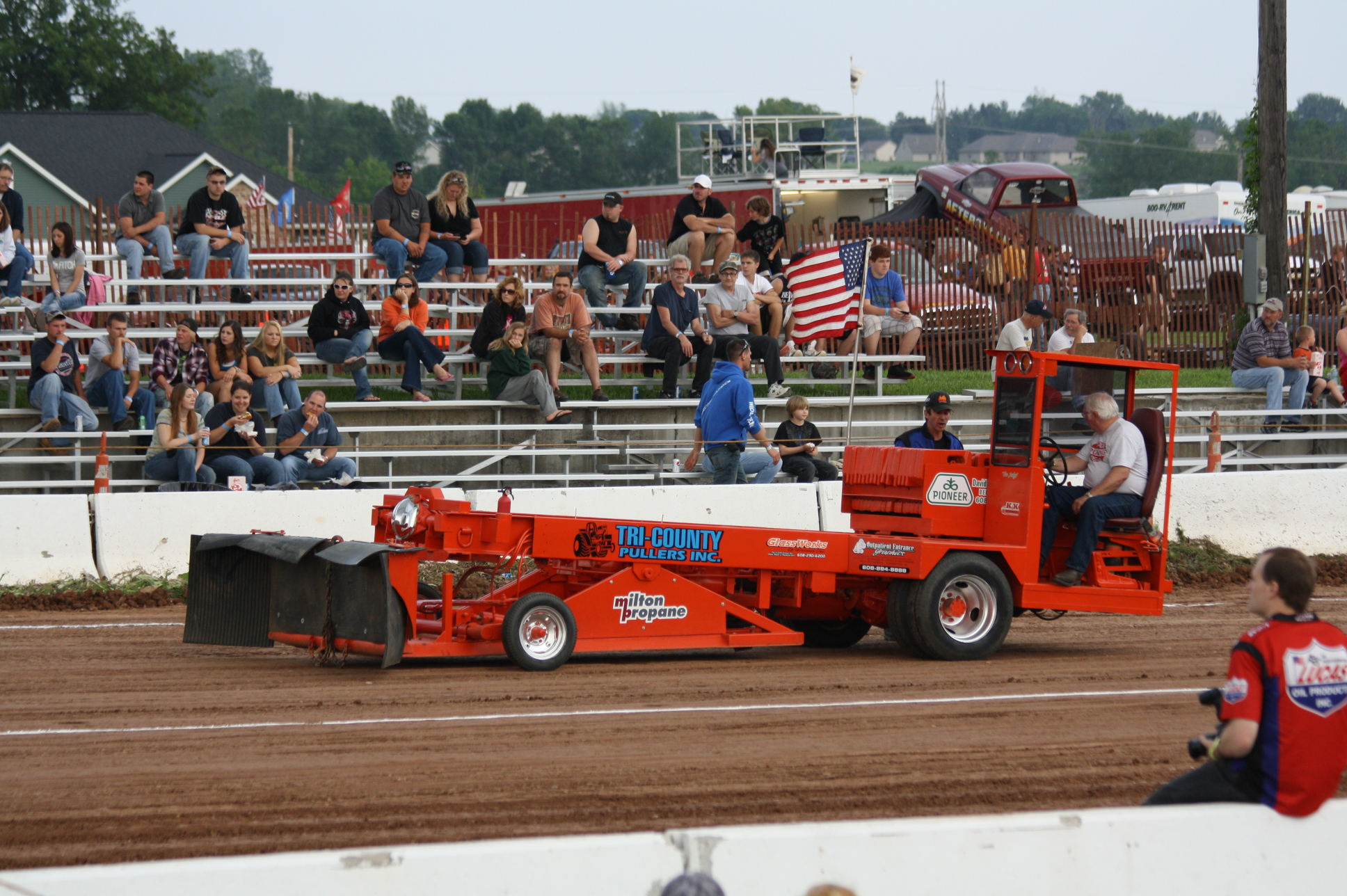
Sled

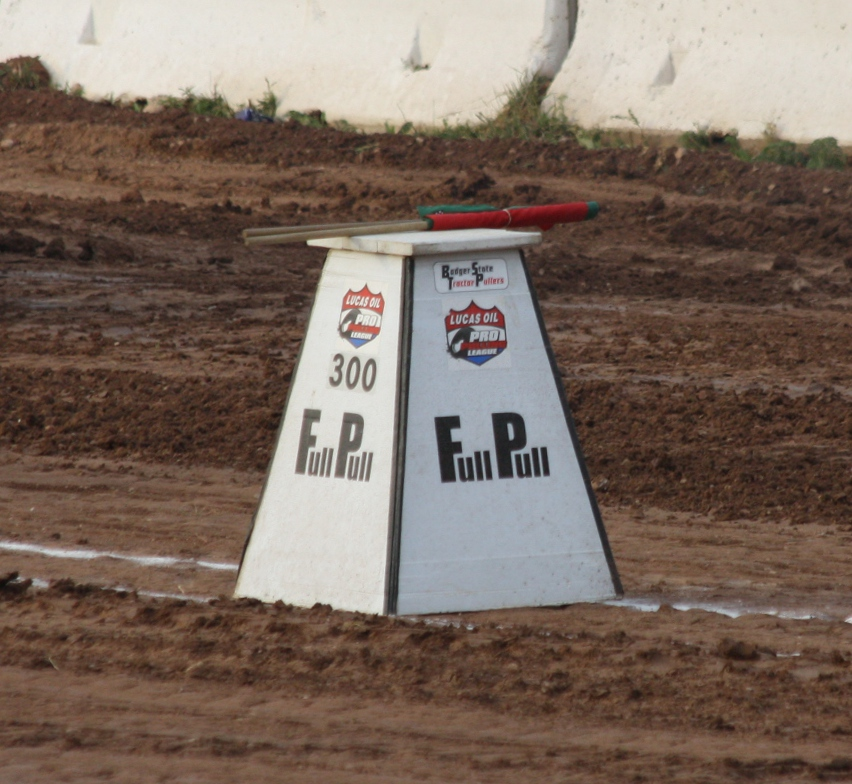
Full Pull marker

In the early days two main techniques were used. Either a dead weight of fixed mass was dragged, or the step-on method was used, where people stood at fixed positions and stepped aboard as the drag passed. Another rule which has now been dropped was that a speed limit should be observed because of injuries resulting from the increased speed at which they boarded. Today's tractors can achieve theoretical speeds over 200 km/h (125 mph).

Today's drags use a complex system of gears to move weights up to 29,000 kilograms (65,000 lb). Upon starting, all the weights are over the drag's rear axles, to give an effective weight of the drag plus zero. As the tractor travels the course, the weights are pushed forward off the drag's axles, pushing the front of the drag into the ground, synthetically creating a gain in weight until the tractor is no longer able to overcome the force of friction. Most drags have grouser bars that act like teeth and dig into the soil to stop the sled.

== Engines ==
Apart from modified standard diesel tractors, a variety of high power engines are used in tractor pulling, which started in the late 1970s. In the early years, mainly single, double or multiple US-made big block dragster engines were used, but nowadays, a lot of parts from discarded military machinery are in use, like Klimov TV3-117 (Isotov) turboshafts from Russian helicopters, Soviet Zvezda M503 torpedo boat engines, Continental AV1790 tank engines, or World-War-2-era aircraft piston engines in V12-shape (e.g. Rolls-Royce Griffon) or as radial engines (e.g. Curtiss-Wright R-3350). Due to the limited number of vintage warbird engines remaining, some organisations that own them, such as the Fantasy of Flight museum in Florida, refuse to sell engines from their collection to customers that wish to use them for tractor pulling. In recent years a number of agricultural engines have been converted to run on methanol with multi-stage turbocharging.

== See also ==
- Tractor-scraper

== Sources ==
- Origins of horse pulling
- History of tractor/power pulling and sled technology
- the rules of tractor/power pulling
- United Pullers of the Carolinas
