= Ural Diesel Engine Plant =

Industrial manufacturer in Yekaterinburg, Russia

- Company type: Open joint-stock company
- Founded: 1941
- Headquarters: Yekaterinburg, Russia
- Parent: Sinara Transport Machines
- Website: https://udmz.inni.info

Ural Diesel Engine Plant (Russian: Уральский дизель-моторный завод) is a company based in Yekaterinburg, Russia.

== History ==
The plant was formed in 1941 as Ural Turbine Factory as part of a large scale movement of industrial capacity from western Russia during the Second World War. The engine manufacturing facilities of the Kirov Plant in Leningrad and the Kharkov diesel factory 75 (Харьковский дизельный завод №75) were transported to the Ural region of Russia (Sverdlovsk).

The factory was in production by August 1941, and produced M-40 aero engines and V-2 engines for tanks. By 1942 production was over 20 engines per day, and in 1942 received an Order of Lenin and in 1943 an Order of the Red Banner of Labour for its contributions. By August 1945 the plant had produced 25,000 engines.

After the end of WWII production of diesel engines continued, with the plant producing engines for oil drilling, excavators, locomotives and mobile generators. Exports of engines began in 1956. After 1962 all engines produced were turbocharged. After 1979 the factory became a key supplier of diesel engines for Belarusian dump truck manufacturer BelAZ.

In 2003 the company became and open joint stock company as ОАО "Турбомоторный завод", in 2008 it was acquired by the Sinara Group and became the limited liability company Ural diesel engine plant ( ООО Уральский дизель-моторный завод УДМЗ).

As of 2010 the plant produces diesel generators, turbochargers and diesel engines for locomotives and heavy off-road equipment in the 630 to 1,600 kilowatts (840 to 2,150 hp) range.

== Engines ==
- DM-185 V12 UDMZ up to 3 (0.7 1 - 4.7 MW), 7+ MW, plans for 10 - 17+ MW

at KMZ - RD and UDMZ

- 8DM21L
- DM-21 V6 (1050-1500 hp) V8 (1300-2000 hp) V12 (2000-3000)

27 29

land vehicles

- V-2 derivatives along ChTZ and Barnaul BTM

KMZ RD

- ADG1000
- ADG6000
- various V12 V16 and V18 from 3 5 MW 58D/A/E up to 8 9 MW
- 68B, 68G, 85D 86B 86G 8,8 MW V18
