= National Tractor Pullers Association =

- Sport: Tractor pulling
- Category: Motorsports
- Jurisdiction: United States, Canada
- Abbreviation: NTPA
- Founded: 1969
- Headquarters: 6155-B Huntley Road Columbus, Ohio 43229
- President: Keith Theobald
- Secretary: Jimmy Thigpen,
- Other key staff: Jesse Petro, Director Buddy Godwin, Director; Mark Peissig, Director; Dave Closser, Director; Michael Ott, Director Dennis Christensen, Director

Official website
- www.ntpapull.com
- (United States)
- (Canada)

The National Tractor Pullers Association (NTPA) is a national tractor pulling sanctioning body in the United States. It was born of a need to unify the rules and classes in the sport of truck and tractor pulling.

== History ==
The NTPA was founded in 1969 by representatives of eight states (Illinois, Indiana, Iowa, Michigan, Minnesota, Missouri, Ohio, and Pennsylvania) to establish uniform rules and provide structure to the sport of truck and tractor pulling. Throughout the years, the NTPA has been instrumental in implementation of safety standards in the sport, and is the governing body from which most other truck and tractor pulling organizations, foreign or domestic, copy their rules. Since 1987, the NTPA has been managed by the World Pulling International, Inc, which also is a marketing department and publications department of the NTPA.

== See also ==
- Tractor Pulling
- RFD-TV
- Lucas Oil Pro Pulling League
