= History of the oil shale industry =

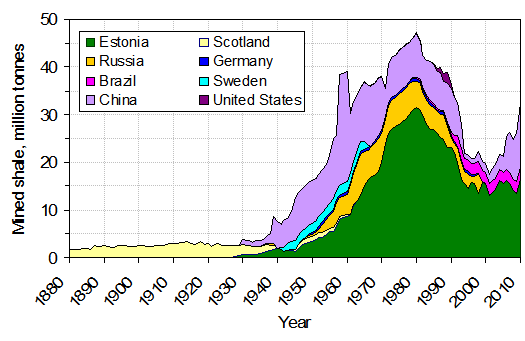
Production of oil shale in millions of metric tons, from 1880 to 2010. Source: Pierre Allix, Alan K. Burnham.

The history of the oil shale industry started in ancient times. The modern industrial use of oil shale for oil extraction dates to the mid-19th century and started growing just before World War I because of the mass production of automobiles and trucks and the supposed shortage of gasoline for transportation needs. Between the World Wars oil shale projects were begun in several countries.

After World War II, the oil shale industry declined due to increased accessibility to conventional crude oil. (Note: free-flowing crude oil or petroleum commercially displaced petroleum extracts from oil shale because the process of retorting thermal immature oil shales was energy intensive and expensive. For the last century, petroleum crude has become the conventional reservoir, with oil shale becoming unconventional and exceptional -) As of 2010, oil shale was commercially used in Estonia, China and Brazil, while several countries are considering to start or restart commercial use of oil shale.

== Early history ==
Humans have used oil shale as a fuel since prehistoric times, since it generally burns without any processing. It was also used for decorative purposes and construction. Britons of the Iron Age used to polish and form oil shale into ornaments. Around 3000 BC, "rock oil" was used in Mesopotamia for road construction and making architectural adhesives.

As a decorative material, oil shale was also used over the Greek, Roman, Byzantine, Umayyad and Abbasid periods to decorate mosaics and floors of the palaces, churches and mosques.

Shale oil was used for medical and military purposes. Mesopotamians used it for medical purposes and for caulking ships, Mongols used to cap their arrows with flaming oil shale. In the 10th century, the Arabian physician Masawaih al-Mardini (Mesue the Younger) described a method of extraction of oil from "some kind of bituminous shale". In the early 14th century, the first use of shale oil was recorded in Switzerland and Austria. In 1350, a knight Berthold von Ebenhausen was awarded a right to exploit the Seefeld oil shale in Tyrol. Oil shale was used for production of shale oil using an early retorting method of heating the crushed oil shale put in crucibles. The healing properties of a mineral oil distilled from oil shale were noted in 1596 by the personal physician of the Duke of Württemberg Frederick I.

In Skåne, the Swedish alum shale dating from the Cambrian and Ordovician periods was used for extracting potassium aluminium sulfate by roasting it over fire as early as 1637. In Italy, shale oil was used to light the streets of Modena at the turn of the 17th century. The British Crown granted a patent in 1694 to three persons named Martin Eele, Thomas Hancock and William Portlock who had "found a way to extract and make great quantities of pitch, tarr, and oyle out of a sort of stone." Shale oil was produced by extracting Shropshire oil shale. Later sold as Betton's British Oil, the distilled product was said to have been "tried by divers persons in Aches and Pains with much benefit." In 1781, Archibald Cochrane, 9th Earl of Dundonald, registered a patent for an extraction process to produce tar, pitch and oil from coal and bituminous shales, using masonry retorts and wooden condensers.

In Russia Peter the Great initiated an investigative program of Ukhta oil shale in 1697. Data on physical and chemical properties of Ukhta oil shale was published by a correspondent member of the Russian Academy Tertii Bornovolokov in 1809. In 1769, Peter Simon Pallas described oil shale of the Volga Region. In the 1830s Germain Henri Hess investigated Baltic oil shales with resulting determination of the semicoking process product yields.

Oil shale in Australia was referred to for the first time by François Péron, et al., in Voyage de Découverte aux Terres Australes which was published in Paris in 1807, describing what was probably torbanite from the Newnes deposit.

== Start of the modern industry ==
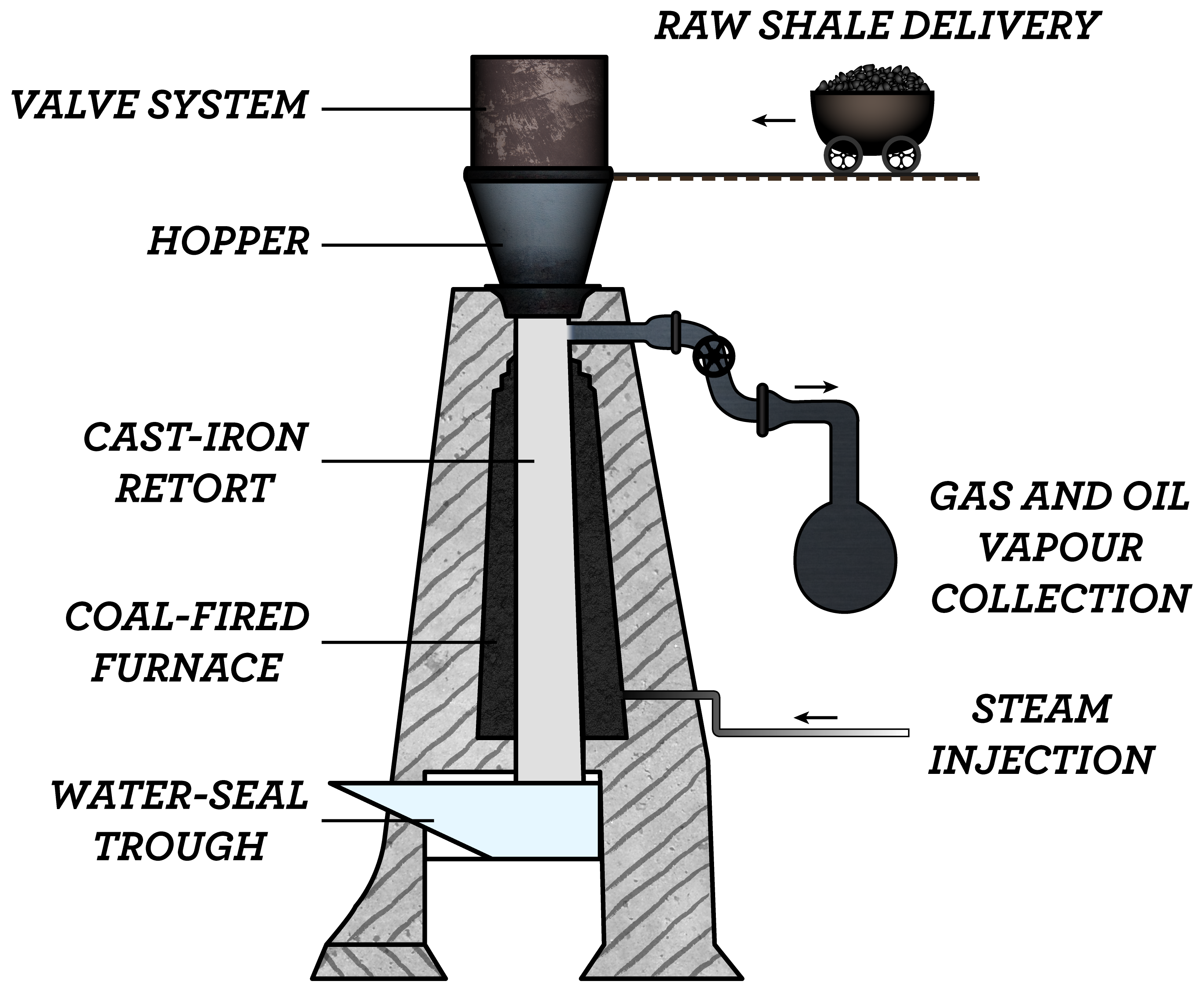
Alexander C. Kirk's retort, used in the mid-to-late 19th century, was one of the first vertical oil shale retorts. Its design is typical of retorts used in the end of the 19th and the beginning of the 20th century.

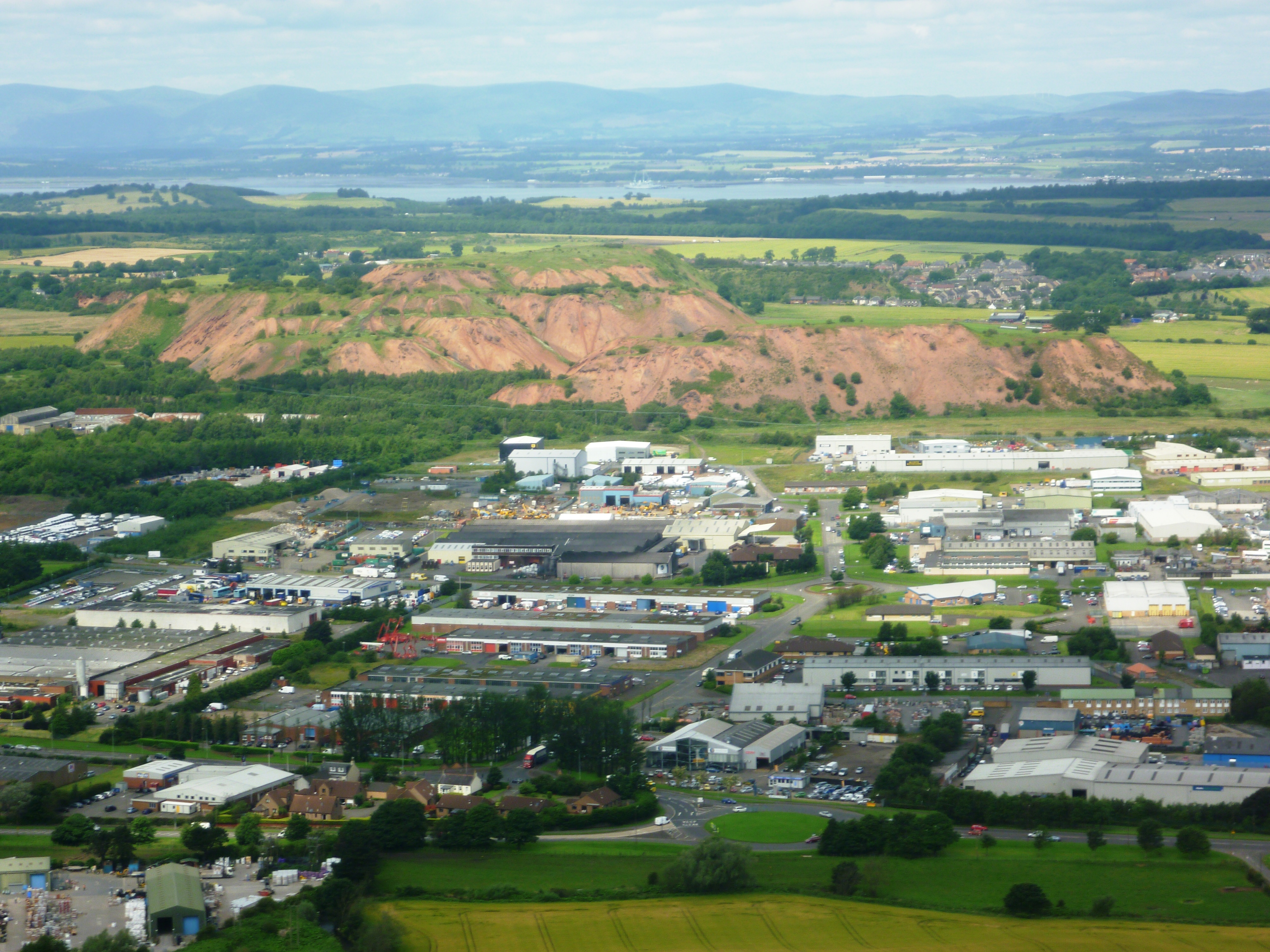
Three of West Lothian's shale bings - reminders of the industry pioneered in Scotland by James "Paraffin" Young.

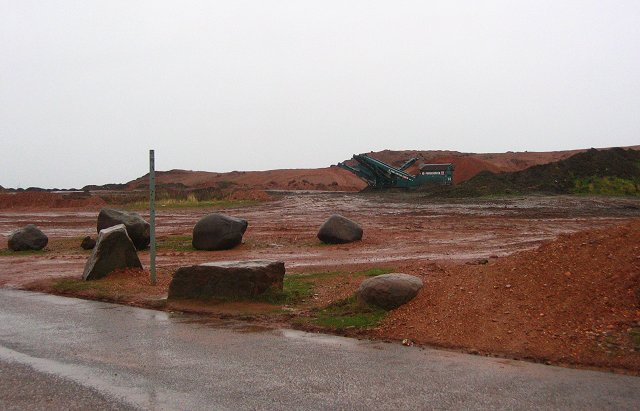
The remains of a shale bing, Drumshoreland, near Pumpherston.

The modern industrial use of oil shale for oil extraction started in France, where oil shale commercial mining began in Autun in 1837. The shale oil production started in 1838 by using Selligue process, invented by Alexander Selligue. In 1846 the Canadian physician and geologist Abraham Gesner invented a process for retorting an illuminating liquid from coal, bitumen and oil shale. In 1847 the Scottish chemist James Young prepared "lighting oil," lubricating oil and wax from cannel coal and since 1862 from torbanite. In 1850 he patented the process of retorting and refining shale oil and purifying paraffin wax from it. Commercial scale shale oil extraction from lamosite started in 1859 by Robert Bell in Broxburn, West Lothian. After the expiry of Young's patent in 1862 many small shale oil works were opened. By 1865, there were about 120 shale oil works in Scotland. In 1866 Young established Young's Paraffin Light and Mineral Oil Company at Addiewell. Other notable shale oil companies were the Broxburn Oil Company established in 1878 and the Pumpherston Oil Company established in 1892.

In the United States early oil-shale industry concentrated on the eastern oil shale deposits. An oil distillery was built in 1855 at Breckinridge County, Kentucky to produce oil from locally mined cannel coal. By the following year it was producing 600 to 700 US gallons per day (2.3 to 2.6 m^{3}/d). In 1860, there were 55 companies in the United States extracting oil from locally mined cannel coal. Commercial-scale shale oil extraction, other than cannel coal processing, began at shale oil retorts using the Devonian oil shale along the Ohio River Valley in 1857. However, the discovery of cheap and abundant petroleum in the same region, starting with the Drake Oil Well at Titusville, Pennsylvania in 1859, put the American oil shale industry out of business by 1860. The largest deposit, Green River Formation, was accidentally discovered in 1874 but not utilized until beginning of the 20th century.

In 1857, oil shale industry started in Germany. In Canada, the Craigleith Shale Oil Works started to retort oil shale of the Ordovician Whitby Formation near Collingwood, Ontario, on Lake Huron in 1859. In 1861 it became economically infeasible due to the discovery of petroleum nearby.

In Australia, the first oil shale mine was commenced in 1865 at American Creek, Mount Kembla in New South Wales. At the same year, the first shale oil was produced by the Pioneer Kerosene Works at American Creek. A number of other mines and shale oil plants were opened in New South Wales; however, in the beginning of the 20th century they were closed due to the import of cheaper crude oil.

In Austria, oil shale was used in 1840–1882 for production of asphalt mastic, naphtha and asphalt tar. In Sweden, the first attempt to extract oil from alum shale was made in 1864. Shale oil production started in the 1890s and lasted few years. In Brazil, oil shale was first exploited in 1884 in Bahia. In 1900 shale oil extraction industry was initiated also in New Zealand.

In 1894, the Pumpherston retort (also known as the Bryson retort) was invented, which is considered as a separation of the oil shale industry from the coal industry. It stayed in use until 1938.

Operations during the 19th century focused on the production of kerosene, lamp oil, and paraffin wax; these products helped supply the growing demand for lighting that arose during the Industrial Revolution. Fuel oil, lubricating oil and grease, and ammonium sulfate were also produced.

== Beginning of the 20th century ==
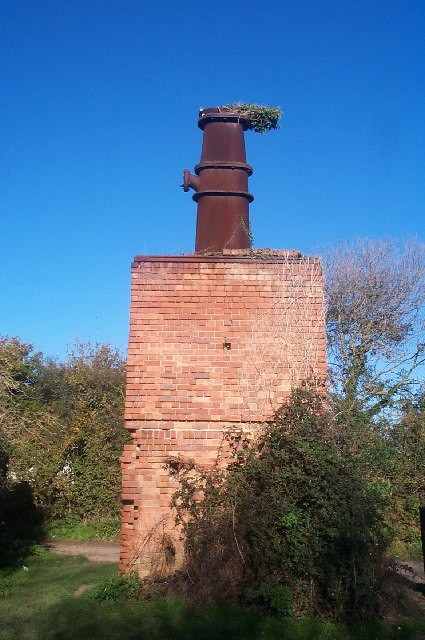
Oil retort at Kilve, West Somerset, England

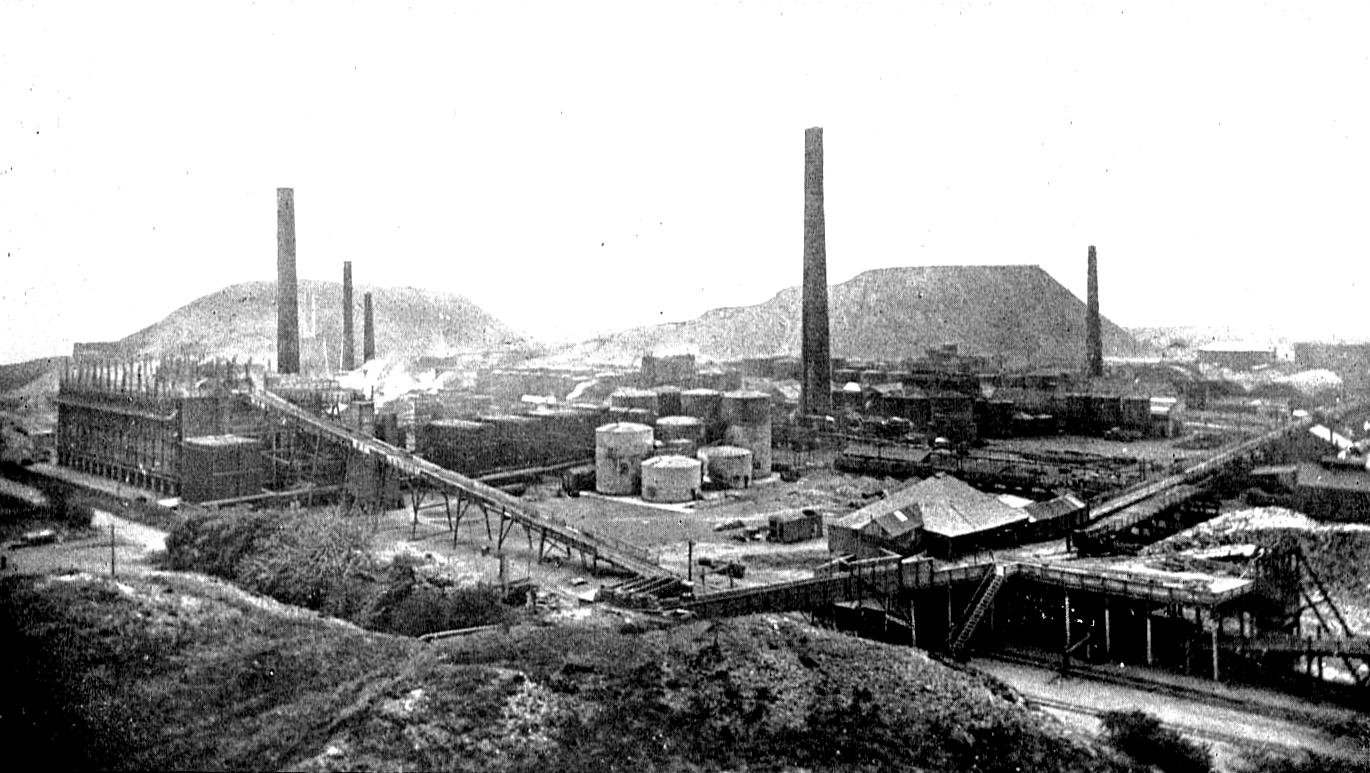
Pumpherston oil shale retorts, Scotland, 1922

The oil shale industry expanded immediately before World War I because of limited access to conventional petroleum resources and the mass production of automobiles and trucks, which accompanied an increase in gasoline consumption. Oil shale production in Scotland peaked in 1910–1912 with more than three million tonnes. That time Scottish shale oil industry contributed 2% of global oil production. After that, production declined with exception of the period of World War II. In 1919, five survived shale oil companies (Young's Paraffin Light & Mineral Oil Company, Broxburn Oil Company, Pumpherston Shale Oil Company, Oakbank Oil Company, and James Ross & Company Philpstoun Oil Works), were merged into Scottish Oils, a subsidiary of Anglo-Persian Oil Company.

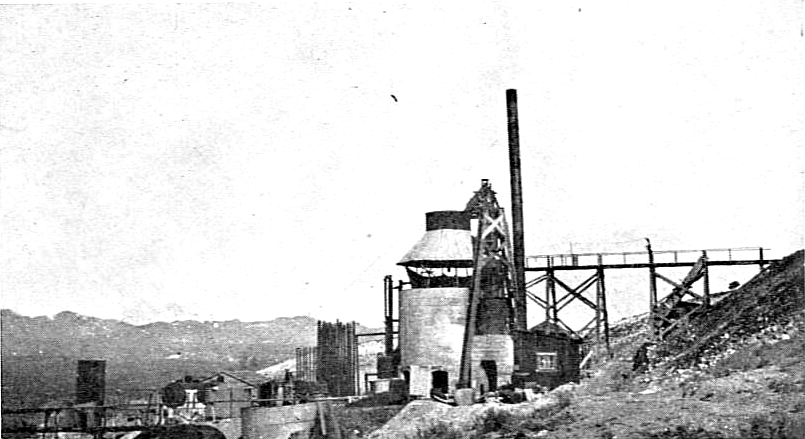
Oil shale retorts, Nevada, 1922

In the United States the government started to create the Naval Petroleum and Oil Shale Reserves in 1909. The reserves were seen as a possible emergency source of fuel for the military, particularly the Navy. The government reserved the Roan Plateau near Rifle, Colorado which later became a federal demonstration and test site. First attempt to produce oil from the western deposits was made in Nevada by local businessman Robert Catlin by acquiring oil-shale properties in the 1890s and erecting the first retorts in 1915 and 1916. Although the attempt was commercially unsuccessful, in 1917 he incorporated Catlin Shale Products Company which made several unsuccessful attempts to sold shale oil products until it was dissolved in 1930. The first attempts to exploit the Green River Formation deposit was made by establishment of The Oil Shale Mining Company in 1916. In 1917, they erected the first commercial retort at the head of Dry Creek, near De Beque, Colorado. However, also these attempts were unsuccessful and by 1926 the company had lost its property. In addition, companies like Cities Service, Standard Oil of California, Texaco and Union started their oil shale operations in 1918–1920. In 1915–1920 about 200 companies were established to exploit oil shale and at least 25 shale oil retorting processes reached to the pilot-plant stage. Discoveries of the large quantities of petroleum in eastern Texas ended the oil-shale boom. One of technological achievements before World War II was invention of the N-T-U retort. In 1925, the NTU Company built a test plant at Sherman Cut near Casmalia, California. In 1925–1929, the retort was also tested by the United States Bureau of Mines in their Oil Shale Experiment Station at Anvil Point in Rifle, Colorado.

During World War I, the German Army produced shale oil from the Jordan oil shale at the Yarmouk area to operate the Hejaz Railway. In 1915 an oil shale industry was established in Switzerland. About 1920, a small mall shale oil extraction plant was opened at Kinnekulle, Sweden. In 1922, a small shale oil extraction plant was opened in Puertollano, Spain.

The year 1916 is considered the beginning of the Estonian oil shale industry. when a group of geologists, led by Nikolay Pogrebov, was sent to Estonia to organise the mining of oil shale and its transportation to Saint Petersburg (then known as Petrograd). In June 1916, the first tonnes of oil shale were mined at Pavandu and delivered to Saint Petersburg Polytechnical University for large-scale experiments. In 1917, Russian paleontologist Mikhail Zalessky named kukersite oil shale after the Kukruse settlement. Continuous mining activities started shortly after. Initially, oil shale was used primarily in the cement industry, for firing in locomotive furnaces, and as a household fuel, followed by shale oil and power production. As of 1925, all locomotives in Estonia were powered by oil shale. The first experimental oil shale processing retorts were built in 1921, using the method developed by Julius Pintsch AG. In 1924, the Tallinn Power Plant was the first power plant in the world to employ oil shale as its primary fuel. In 1939 Estonia mined 1.453 million tonnes of oil shale and produced 181,000 tonnes of shale oil, including 22,500 tonnes of oil that were suitable gasoline equivalents. Almost half of Estonian produced shale oil was exported accounting for 8% of country's total export.

In China, the extraction of oil shale began in 1926 under the Japanese rule. The commercial-scale production of shale oil began in 1930 in Fushun, Manchuria, with the construction of the "Refinery No. 1" operating Fushun-type retorts. In Russia, Kashpirskoye oil shale near Syzran in the Volga region was mined and processed in 1919–1924 and again starting from 1929. Leningradslanets opened the Kirov oil shale mine in 1934 in Slantsy, Leningrad Oblast and shale oil production started in 1939. Saratov and Syzran power stations in Russia started to use oil shale as fuel. In South Africa different attempts of using oil shale were made since beginning of century. In 1903 the Transvaal Oil Shale Syndicate investigated oil shale at Kikvorschfontein. In 1919–1931 the African Oil Corporation investigated oil shale at Kromhoek and Goedgevonden. In 1935, The South African Torbanite Mining and Refining Company, a joint venture of Anglo-Transvaal Consolidated Investment Company and Burmah Oil opened shale oil plant at Ermelo in 1935.

Between the World Wars oil shale projects were also in restarted in Brazil and, for a short time, in Canada.

== World War II ==
In 1939–1945, a shale oil pilot plant operated in Morocco. In Australia shale oil production restarted shortly before World War II. In 1937, the National Oil Proprietary was created. The Glen Davis Shale Oil Works became operational at Glen Davis, New South Wales in 1940 as the main facility in the country. In addition, in 1940–1952, three N-T-U retorts were operated at Marangaroo, New South Wales.

In Sweden, Svenska skifferolje AB (Swedish Shale Oil Company) was formed in 1940. It exploited one of the earliest in-situ processes–underground gasification by electrical energy (Ljungström method)–between 1940 and 1966 at Kvarntorp.

During the German occupation of Estonia, Estonia's oil shale industry was merged into a company named Baltische Öl GmbH. This entity was subordinated to Kontinentale Öl, a company that had exclusive rights to oil production in German-occupied territories. The primary purpose of the industry was production of oil for the German Army.

In Germany shale oil extraction started at the Dotternhausen cement factory in 1940. Later the Operation Desert (Unternehmen Wüste) was launched for the oil extraction from Swabian Alb oil shale deposits (Posidonia Shale). However, out of ten planned shale-oil extraction plants only four became operational. The used modified in-situ process was primitive with extremely low oil recovery and it was hard to control.

In 1944 the United States adopted the Synthetic Liquid Fuels Program with goal to establish a liquid fuel supply from domestic oil shale. The Bureau of Mines started mining studies and development of the gas combustion retort process at Anvil Point. In 1943 Mobil Oil built a pilot shale oil extraction plant and in 1944 Union built an experimental oil shale retort. In 1945 Texaco started shale oil refining study.

== 1950s–1960s ==
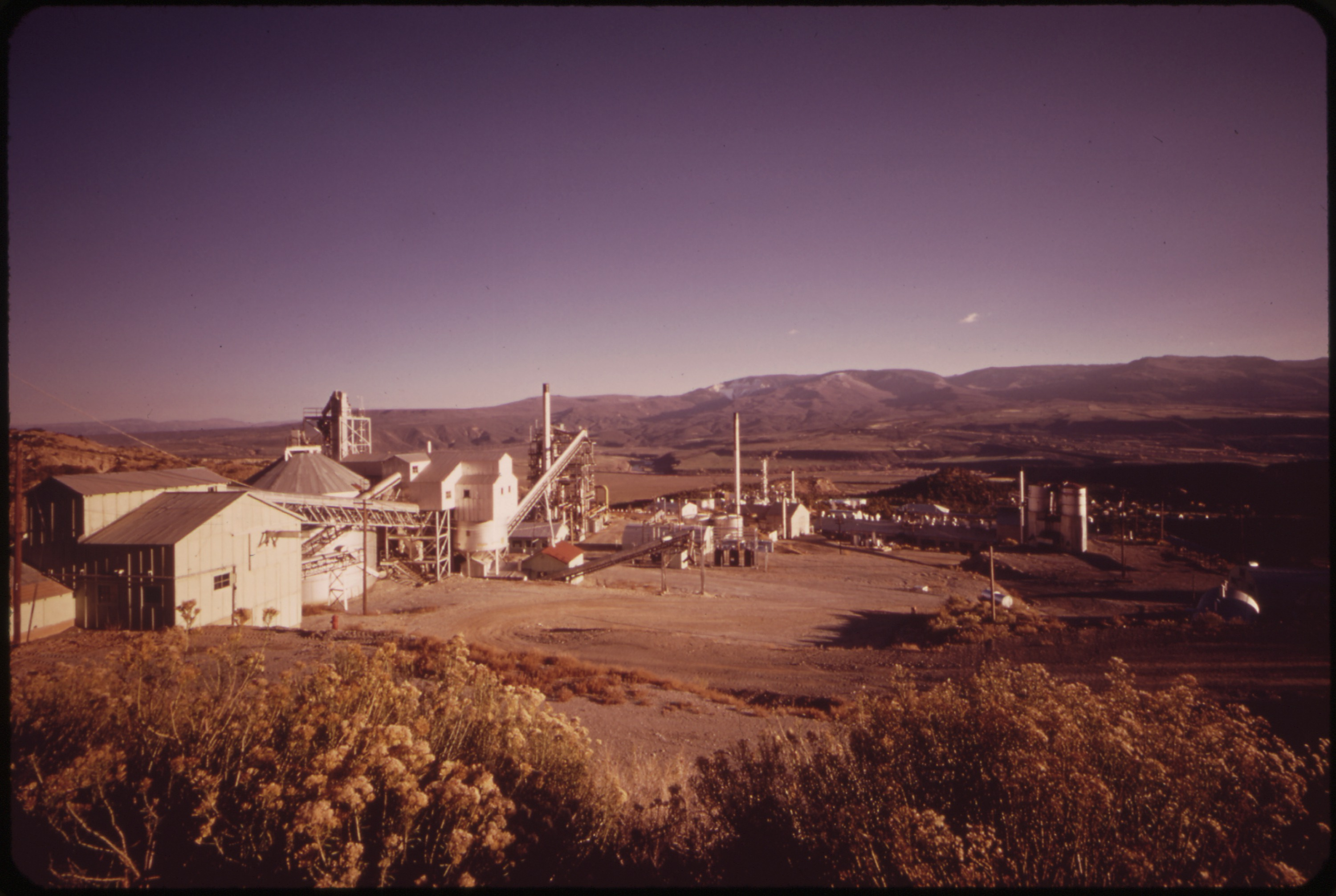
Anvils Point Research Center in 1970.

Although the Estonian, Russian and Chinese oil shale industries continued to grow after World War II, most other countries abandoned their projects due to high processing costs and the availability of cheaper petroleum. The shale oil extraction in Australia was discontinued in 1952 due to ceasing of government funding, in France in 1957, in Britain and South Africa in 1962, and in Sweden and Spain in 1966. In Germany only Rohrbach Zement (now part of Holcim) in Dotternhausen continued using oil shale for cement, power and thermal energy production.

After World War II, the Soviet occupation regime restored the oil shale industry in Estonia. In 1945, the first tunnel kiln was restored and by the end of the 1940s four tunnel kilns had been restored. German prisoners of war contributed most of the labour. In addition to tunnel kilns a number of Kiviter-type retorts and the first Galoter-type retort were built in the 1950s. Since 1948, Estonian-produced oil shale gas was used in Leningrad (Saint Petersburg) and in northern Estonia cities as a substitute for natural gas. During the 1950s, unsuccessful tests of oil shale underground gasification were conducted at Kiviõli. In 1946–1952, uranium compounds were extracted from Graptolitic argillite oil shale in Sillamäe. In 1949, the Kohtla-Järve Power Plant – the first power plant in the world using pulverized oil shale at an industrial scale – was commissioned in Estonia. The world's two largest oil shale-fired power stations – Balti Power Plant and Eesti Power Plant (known as the Narva Power Plants) – were opened in 1965 and in 1973. In 1965, 510 million cubic metres (18×10^{9} cu ft) of oil shale gas were produced and 16.5 million tonnes of oil shale were mined in Estonia.

In Russia, the Slantsy oil shale gas extraction plant was built for supplying oil shale gas to Leningrad and the first unit of the Slantsy oil-shale-fired power plant were commissioned in 1952. Since 1955 until 2003, the plant also produced shale oil using Kiviter technology.

In China, the "Refinery No. 2" of Fushun began its production in 1954 and in 1959, the maximum annual shale oil production increased to 780,000 tonnes. The produced shale oil was used for producing light liquid fuels. In 1961, China was producing one third of its total oil production from oil shale. Afterwards the shale oil production decreased due to the discovery of Daqing oil field and increased production of the cheaper conventional petroleum.

In 1951, the United States Department of Defense became interested in oil shale as an alternative resource for producing a jet fuel. The United States Bureau of Mines continued its research program at Anvil Point until 1956. It opened a demonstration mine which operated at a small scale. From 1949 to 1955 it also tested the gas combustion retort. In 1964 the Avril Point demonstration facility was leased by Colorado School of Mines and was used by Mobil-led consortium (Mobil, Humble, Continental, Amoco, Phillips and Sinclair) for further development of that type of retort. In 1953, Sinclair Oil Corporation developed an in-situ processing method using existing and induced fractures between vertical wells. In the 1960s, a proposal known as Project Bronco, was suggested for a modified in situ process which involved creation of a rubble chimney (a zone in the rock formation created by breaking the rock into fragments) using a nuclear explosive. This plan was abandoned by the Atomic Energy Commission in 1968. Companies developing experimental in-situ retorting processes also included Equity Oil, ARCO, Shell Oil and the Laramie Energy Technology Center.

Unocal Corporation started the development of the Union process in the late 1940s, when the Union A retort was designed. This technology was tested between 1954 and 1958 at the company-owned tract in the Parachute Creek. This production was finally shut down in 1961 due to cost. In 1957 Texaco built a shale oil extraction pilot plant to develop its own hydroretorting process. In the early 1960s TOSCO (The Oil Shale Corporation) opened an underground mine and built an experimental plant near Parachute, Colorado. It was closed in 1972 because the price of production exceeded the cost of imported crude oil.

== 1970s–1980s ==
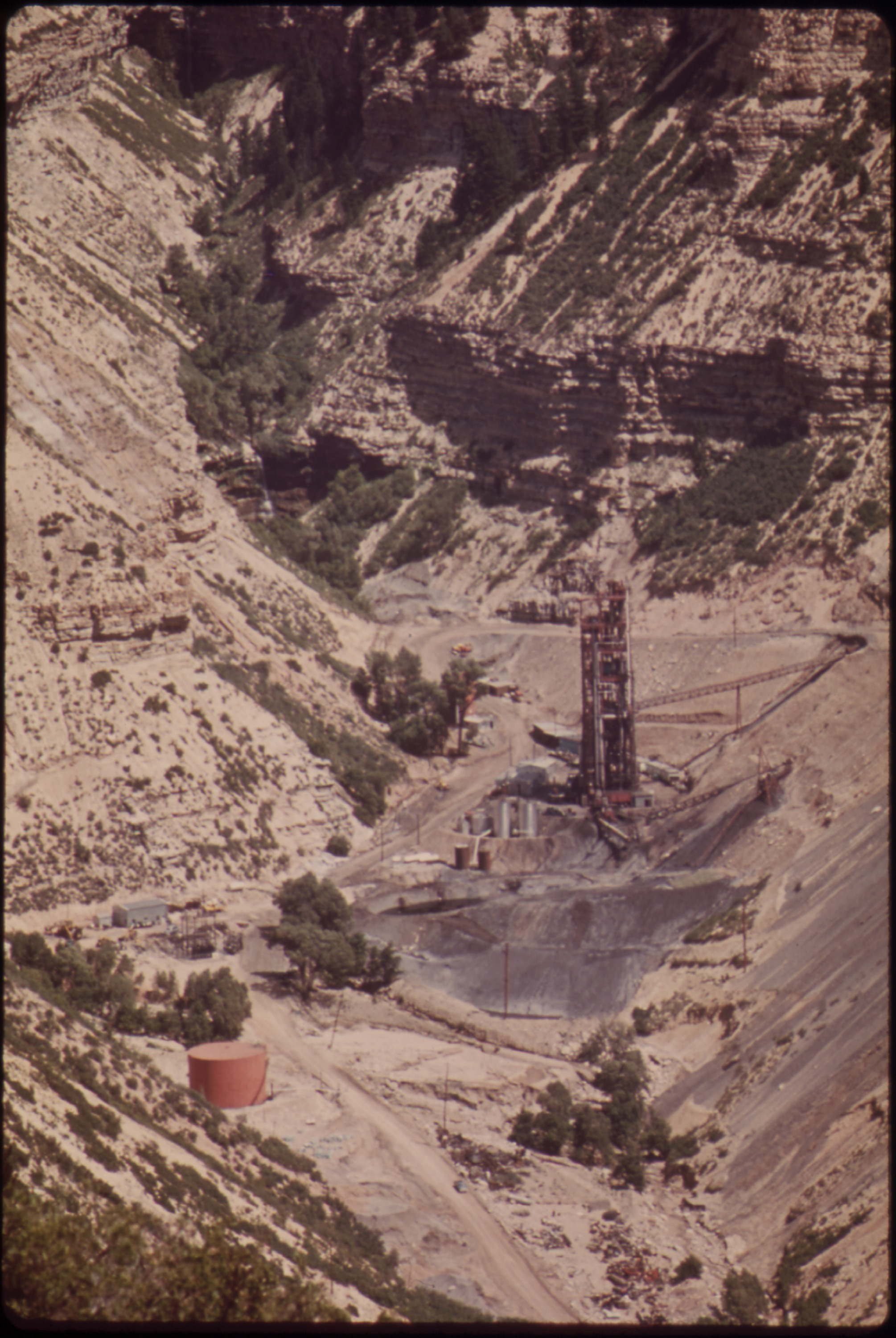
The Colony oil shale development site in August 1973.

Due to the 1973 oil crisis, the oil shale industry restarted in several countries. The United States Navy and the Office of Naval Petroleum and Oil Shale Reserves started evaluations of oil shale's suitability for military fuels, such as jet fuels, marine fuels and a heavy fuel oil. Shale-oil based JP-4 jet fuel was produced until the early 1990s, when it was replaced with kerosene-based JP-8. Seventeen companies led by Standard Oil of Ohio formed the Paraho Development Corporation to develop the Paraho process. Production started in 1974 but was closed in 1978. In 1974 the United States Department of the Interior announced an oil shale leasing program in the oil shale regions of Colorado and Utah. In 1980 the Synthetic Fuels Corporation was established which operated until 1985.

In 1972, the first modified in situ oil shale experiment in the United States was conducted by Occidental Petroleum at Logan Wash, Colorado. Rio Blanco Oil Shale Company, a partnership between Gulf Oil and Standard Oil of Indiana, originally considered using Lurgi–Ruhrgas above-ground retort but in 1977 switch also to the modified in-situ process. In 1985 the company ceased its operations. The White River Shale Corporation, a partnership of Sun Oil, Phillips and Sohio, existed between 1974 and 1986 for developing the tract in the Uintah Basin on the White River area.

In 1977, Superior Oil Company cancelled its Meeker shale oil plant project. Year later Ashland, Cleveland Cliffs and Sohio exited the Colony Shale Oil Project near Parachute, Colorado. Also, Shell exited the Colony project but continued with in-situ test. The United States oil shale industry collapsed when oil prices fell in the early 1980s. On 2 May 1982, known as "Black Sunday", Exxon cancelled the Colony project due to low oil-prices and increased expenses, laying off more than 2,000 workers. In 1986, President Ronald Reagan signed into law the Consolidated Omnibus Budget Reconciliation Act of 1985 which among other things abolished the United States' Synthetic Liquid Fuels Program. The last oil shale retort in the United States, operated by Unocal Corporation, was closed in 1991.

Because of the success of oil shale-based power generation, Estonian oil shale mining peaked in 1980 at 31.35 million tonnes and oil-shale-based power generation peaked at the same year at 18.9 TWh. The largest oil shale mine in the world – the Estonia Mine – was opened in 1972. In 1980 the Narva Oil Plant was commissioned. The industry declined during the two decades that followed this peak. Demand for locally produced electrical power was reduced by construction of nuclear power stations in the Soviet Union, particularly Leningrad Nuclear Power Station.

In Israel, a 0.1 MW pilot oil shale-fired power plant was tested in 1982–1986. A 12.5 MW fluidised-bed demonstration plant in Mishor Rotem became operational in 1989. In Romania, a 990 MW oil shale-fired power plant at Crivina operated in 1983–1988; however, it was decommissioned due to inefficiency and technical problems. In Brazil a 2,400 tons per day semi-works retort (the Irati Profile Plant) was brought on line in 1972, and began limited commercial operation in 1980. A pilot plant that used Petrosix technology started in 1982. It was followed by a demonstration plant in 1984. A commercial retort was brought into service in December 1991.

== Latest developments ==
The global oil shale industry started to grow slightly in the mid-1990s although most of the industries were ceased in Russia. Oil-shale-fired power stations in Slantsy and Syzran were converted to use natural gas and fuel oil. Also, shale-oil producer Zavod Slantsy ceased oil-shale processing. Only Syzran processing plant continued using oil shale for production of ammonium bituminosulfonate.

Existing shale oil extraction plants in Fushun and Moaming, China, were closed in the beginning of 1990s. However, the new shale oil plants in Fushun consist of 220 retorts and the annual capacity has increased up to 350,000 tonnes of shale oil. Several other projects have been developed in various locations. In 2005, China became the largest shale oil producer in the world with an increased number of companies involved in the shale oil extraction.

After decrease in the beginning of 1990s Estonian oil shale production has continuously increased since 1995. Several new processing plants using modified Galoter technology have been built. In 2006, 90 years after major mining had begun, one billion tonnes were mined. Construction of the new 300 MW oil shale-fired power plant began in 2012.

In Australia, the Alberta Taciuk technology was used for a demonstration-scale processing plant at the Stuart Deposit near Gladstone, Queensland, which produced between 2000 and 2004 over 1.5 million barrels (240×10^{3} m^{3}) of shale oil. In 2008–2009, the facility was dismantled and a new demonstration plant based on the Paraho II process was opened in September 2011.

In the United States, an oil shale development program was initiated in 2003. The Energy Policy Act of 2005 introduced a commercial leasing program for oil shale and tar sands resources on public lands within the states of Colorado, Utah, and Wyoming. In 2007, leases were awarded to Chevron Shale Oil, EGL Resources (now American Shale Oil), Oil Shale Exploration Company (now Enefit American Oil) and Shell Frontier Oil & Gas, and in 2010 to ExxonMobil, Natural Soda and AuraSource. Several other companies like Red Leaf Resources and TomCo Energy operates on the private leases. However, Chevron closed its Chevron CRUSH project in 2012 and Shell closed its Mahogany Research Project in 2013.

Since 2006 the government of Jordan has signed a number of memorandum of understanding with foreign companies for shale oil production, including with Petrobras, and has signed concession agreements with Shell, Eesti Energia, Karak International Oil and Saudi Arabian International Corporation for Oil Shale Investment. In 2008, the Ministry of Energy and Mineral Resources of Jordan, the National Electricity Power Company of Jordan, and Eesti Energia signed an agreement to build the 460 MW oil shale-fired Attarat Power Plant.

In 2005 Morocco adopted a new strategy and legal framework for oil shale activities. Since then different agreements have been signed with a number of companies, including Petrobras, Total S.A. and San Leon Energy. In April 2010, the 4th Workshop on Regional Cooperation for Clean Utilization of Oil Shale was held in Egypt and later the same month an Oil Shale Cooperation Center was established in Amman by Egypt, Jordan, Morocco, Syria and Turkey. In 2011, Israel closed the Mishor Rotem Power Station.

In 2013, Uzbekistani national oil company Uzbekneftegaz started construction of the shale oil extraction plant on the Sangruntau oil shale deposit.

== See also ==
- History of the oil shale industry in the United States
- List of shale oil operations in Australia
- Oil shale reserves

== Bibliography ==
- Aaloe, Aasa; Bauert, Heikki; Soesoo, Alvar (2007). Kukersite oil shale (PDF). Tallinn: GEOGuide Baltoscandia. ISBN 978-9985-9834-2-3.
- Addison, J.; Louw, S.J. (1985). Seaton, A. (ed.). History of the industry, working conditions, and mineralogy of Scottish and Green River formation shales (PDF). Studies of the Scottish oil shale industry. Vol. 1. Institute of Occupational Medicine. DE-ACO2 – 82ER60036. Archived from the original on 2011-07-26.
- Alekperov, Vagit (2011). Oil of Russia: Past, Present & Future (PDF). Minneapolis: East View Press. Archived from the original (PDF) on 2015-04-21.
- Andrews, Anthony (2006-04-13). Oil Shale: History, Incentives, and Policy (PDF). Congressional Research Service. RL33359.
- Ashley, George H. (1918). Cannel Coal in the United States. Bulletin 659 (PDF) (Report). United States Department of the Interior, United States Geological Survey.
- Bamberg, J.H.; Ferrier, R.W. (1994). The History of The British Petroleum Company: The Anglo-Iranian Years, 1928–1954. Vol. 2. Cambridge University Press. ISBN 9780521259507.
- "Appendix A: Oil Shale Development Background and Technology Overview". Proposed Oil Shale and Tar Sands Resource Management Plan Amendments to Address Land Use Allocations in Colorado, Utah, and Wyoming and Final Programmatic Environmental Impact Statement (PDF). BLM. September 2008. FES 08-32. Archived from the original (PDF) on 2013-02-16.
- Bunger, James W.; Crawford, Peter M.; Johnson, Harry R. (March 2004). Strategic significance of America's oil shale resource (PDF). Vol. II: Oil shale resources, technology and economics. DOE. Archived from the original (PDF) on 2014-02-21.
- Cane, R.F. (1976). "The origin and formation of oil shale". In Teh Fu Yen; Chilingar, George V. (eds.). Oil Shale. Amsterdam: Elsevier. ISBN 978-0-444-41408-3.
- Carter, George William; Jacobsen, Samuel Clark; Mackintosh, Helen Winchester Youngberg (1939). Low-temperature carbonization of Utah coals: a report of the Utah conservation and research foundation to the governor and state Legislature. Quality press.
- Dyni, John R. (2006). Geology and resources of some world oil-shale deposits. Scientific Investigations Report 2005–5294 (PDF) (Report). United States Department of the Interior, United States Geological Survey.
- Dyni, John R. (2010). "Oil Shale". In Clarke, Alan W.; Trinnaman, Judy A. (eds.). Survey of energy resources (PDF) (22 ed.). World Energy Council. ISBN 978-0-946121-02-1. Archived from the original (PDF) on 2012-03-04.
- EPA Oil Shale Research Group (1979). EPA Program Status Report. Oil shale. Interagency energy-environment research and development program report. EPA.
- Forbes, Robert James (1970). A Short History of the Art of Distillation from the Beginnings Up to the Death of Cellier Blumenthal. Brill Publishers. ISBN 978-90-04-00617-1.
- Forbes, Robert James; O'Beirne, D. R. (1957). The technical development of the Royal Dutch/Shell: 1890-1940. Brill Archive.
- Francu, Juraj; Harvie, Barbra; Laenen, Ben; Siirde, Andres; Veiderma, Mihkel (May 2007). A study on the EU oil shale industry viewed in the light of the Estonian experience (PDF). A report by EASAC to the Committee on Industry, Research and Energy of the European Parliament. European Academies Science Advisory Council.
- Holmberg, Rurik (2008). Survival of the Unfit. Path Dependence and the Estonian Oil Shale Industry (PDF). Linköping Studies in Arts and Science. Vol. 427. Linköping University.
- Kraemer, A.J.; Thorne, H.M. (July 1951). Oil Shale Operations in New South Wales, Australia (PDF). United States Department of the Interior.
- Kraemer, A.J.; Thorne, H.M. (January 1954). Oil Shale Operations in the Union of South Africa, October 1947 (PDF). United States Department of the Interior.
- Lee, Sunggyu (1990). Oil Shale Technology. CRC Press. ISBN 0-8493-4615-0.
- Mapstone, George E. (1950). "Wartime shale-oil production at Marangaroo, New South Wales". Oil shale and cannel coal; proceedings. 2. Institute of Petroleum.
- Marwick, William Hutton (1964). Scotland in Modern Times: An Outline of Economic and Social Development Since the Union Of 1707. Frank Cass and Company Limited. ISBN 9780714613420.
- Merrow, Edward W. (1978). Constraints on the commercialization of oil shale (PDF). The RAND Corporation. ISBN 978-0-8330-0037-8.
- Mushrush, George (1995). Petroleum Products: Instability And Incompatibility. Applied energy technology. CRC Press. ISBN 9781560322979.
- Nersesian, Roy L. (2010). Energy for the 21st century: a comprehensive guide to conventional and alternative sources. M. E. Sharpe. ISBN 978-0-7656-2413-0.
- Office of Technology Assessment (June 1980). An Assessment of Oil Shale Technologies (PDF). Diane Publishing Company. ISBN 978-1-4289-2463-5. NTIS order #PB80-210115.
- Ots, Arvo (2006) [2004]. Toni Tyson; Mary McQuillen (eds.). Oil Shale Fuel Combustion. Tallinn: Arvo Ots; Eesti Energia. ISBN 978-9949-13-710-7.
- Prien, Charles H. (1976). "Survey of oil-shale research in last three decades". In Teh Fu Yen; Chilingar, George V. (eds.). Oil Shale. Amsterdam: Elsevier. pp. 235–244. ISBN 978-0-444-41408-3.
- Trass, O. (2011). "Characterization and preparation of biomass, oil shale and coal-based feedstocks". In Khan, M. R. (ed.). Advances in Clean Hydrocarbon Fuel Processing: Science and Technology. Woodhead Publishing Series in Energy. Amsterdam: Elsevier. pp. 3–53. ISBN 9780857093783.
