= Zavod Slantsy =

Russian petrochemical company

Zavod Slantsy OAO
- Company type: Public
- Industry: Petrochemical
- Founded: 1945
- Headquarters: Slantsy, Leningrad Oblast, Russia
- Parent: Rosimushchestvo
- Website: www.slantsy.ru

Zavod Slantsy OAO (former names: Gazoslantsevyi zavod and Slantsepererabatyvayushiy zavod Slantsy, Russian: ОАО «Завод Сланцы») is a petrochemical company based in Slantsy, Leningrad Oblast, Russia.

The company was established in 1945 to supply Leningrad with oil shale gas, synthetic gas produced by oil shale pyrolysis. In 1952, the first unit of a 75 MW oil shale-fired power plant and the first stage of the oil shale gas extraction plant was commissioned. Since 1955 until 2000 the plant produced shale oil using Kiviter technology. In addition, it produced other chemical products from oil shale. Oil shale was supplied by the mining company Leningradslanets. In 1970, the company started petroleum coke tempering.

Zavod Slantsy was reorganization from Slantsepererabatyvayushiy zavod Slantsy in 1993. In 1998, the 75 MW thermal power plant was converted from oil shale to natural gas. The company continued produce shale oil until June 2003. As of today, the company produces polymeric petroleum resin and distillates, petroleum coke tempering and gas condensate refining.

Rosimushchestvo controls 41.75% shares (55.7% of votes) of the company while Viktor Vekselberg's Renova Group controls 40% since 2007. Rosimushchestvo have tried several times to sell its stake. The new auction is scheduled for 7 December 2012. In November 2011, Arbitration Court at Saint Petersburg Chamber of Commerce and Industry based on the lawsuit filed by Gazprom, started a supervisory procedure on Zavod Slantsy.
