= Court of Arbitration =

A Court of Arbitration is a court, sometimes outside of a country's official judicial system, that resolves certain kinds of civil disputes, primarily between industrial or commercial entities or employers and employees.

The Court of Arbitration of the Australian state of New South Wales, which dealt exclusively with industrial relations disputes in the early twentieth century, has been claimed to be the world's first court of this type. The court was unique at that time as it was the first court of its type to deal with labour relations between employers and employees on a compulsory basis.

Notable examples of such courts include:

- Arbitration Court at Saint Petersburg Chamber of Commerce and Industry
- Commonwealth Court of Conciliation and Arbitration
- Court of Arbitration (New South Wales)
- Employment Court of New Zealand, formerly known as the Court of Arbitration
- Court of Arbitration for Sport
- International Court of Arbitration (United Nations body for the resolution of international commercial disputes)
- London Court of International Arbitration (London-based, non-UN-backed body for resolution of international disputes)
- Permanent Court of Arbitration (Hague-based, non-UN-backed body for resolution of international disputes)
- High Court of Arbitration of Russia
