= Petroleum resin =

A hydrocarbon resin is a C5/C9 aromatic hydrocarbon that is used in industrial applications. It has a tackifying effect and is suitable for use in paint, printing ink, adhesives, rubber and other areas where tackiness is required.

Generally, the petroleum resins are not used independently, but have to be used together with other types of resins as promoters, adjusting agents and modifiers in hot-melt adhesive, pressure-sensitive adhesive, hot melt road marking paint, rubber tires etc.

There are various types of hydrocarbon resins, including C5 Resins, C9 Resins, C5/C9 copolymer resins and hydrogenated resins. C5 Resins are produced from aliphatic crackers like piperylene and isoprene, the current major catalyst is AlCl_{3}. C9 Resins are produced from aromatic crackers like vinyltoluenes, Indene, alpha-methylstyrene, styrene, methylidenes, etc. The current major catalyst is BF_{3}. C5/C9 copolymer resins are produced from both aliphatic crackers and aromatic crackers. There are some additional processes like hydrogenated (use hydrogen) for hydrocarbon resins. By this way, the double bond is neutralized and light colors, even water white resins, are produced. There are some different types, including hydrogenated C5 Resins, hydrogenated C9 Resins, hydrogenated C5/C9 resins, and hydrogenated DCPD resins.
