= Gas combustion retort process =

Gas Combustion Retort
- Process type: chemical
- Industrial sector(s): chemical industry, oil industry
- Feedstock: oil shale
- Product(s): shale oil
- Main facilities: United States Bureau of Mines' Oil Shale Experiment Station
- Developer(s): United States Bureau of Mines

The gas combustion retort process (also referred as gas-combustion retorting process) was an above-ground retorting technology for shale oil extraction. It was a predecessor of the Paraho and Petrosix processes, and modern directly heated oil shale retorting technologies in general.

== History ==
The gas combustion retort process was developed by the United States Bureau of Mines at the end of the 1940s. The first gas combustion retort, designed by Cameron Engineers, went into operation in 1949 and it was located in the United States Bureau of Mines' Oil Shale Experiment Station at Anvil Point in Rifle, Colorado. The Bureau of Mines tested this process in three retorts with capacity of 6, 10, and 25 ton of oil shale per day accordingly. The consortium of Mobil, Humble Oil, Continental Oil, Pan American Oil, Phillips Petroleum Company, and Sinclair Oil evaluated and improved this technology between 1964 and 1968.

== Technology ==
The gas combustion retort process is classified as an internal combustion technology. For the oil shale pyrolysis it uses a vertical vessel retort.

Crushed raw oil shale is fed into the top of the retort, and it moves downward by gravity. When moving downward, oil shale is heated by the rising recycled gases, which cause decomposition of the rock. Recycled gases enter the retort from the bottom. Gases are heated on the lower part of retort by descended spent shale. On their way up, gases move through the combustion zone, where air and dilution gases are injected causing combustion of gases and carbonaceous residue of spent shale (char). The heat from combustion brings the temperature in the retorting zone above of the burning zone to the necessary level for retorting. The incoming raw oil shale cool oil vapors and gases, which then leave the top of the retort as a mist.

The main advantage of this process was that it does not require cooling water, which made it suitable for using in the semi-arid regions.

== See also ==
- Nevada–Texas–Utah Retort
- Alberta Taciuk Process
- Petrosix
- Galoter process
- TOSCO II process
- Fushun process
- Superior multimineral process
