= Slantsy, Leningrad Oblast =

Town in Leningrad Oblast, Russia

Slantsy Сланцы
- Town
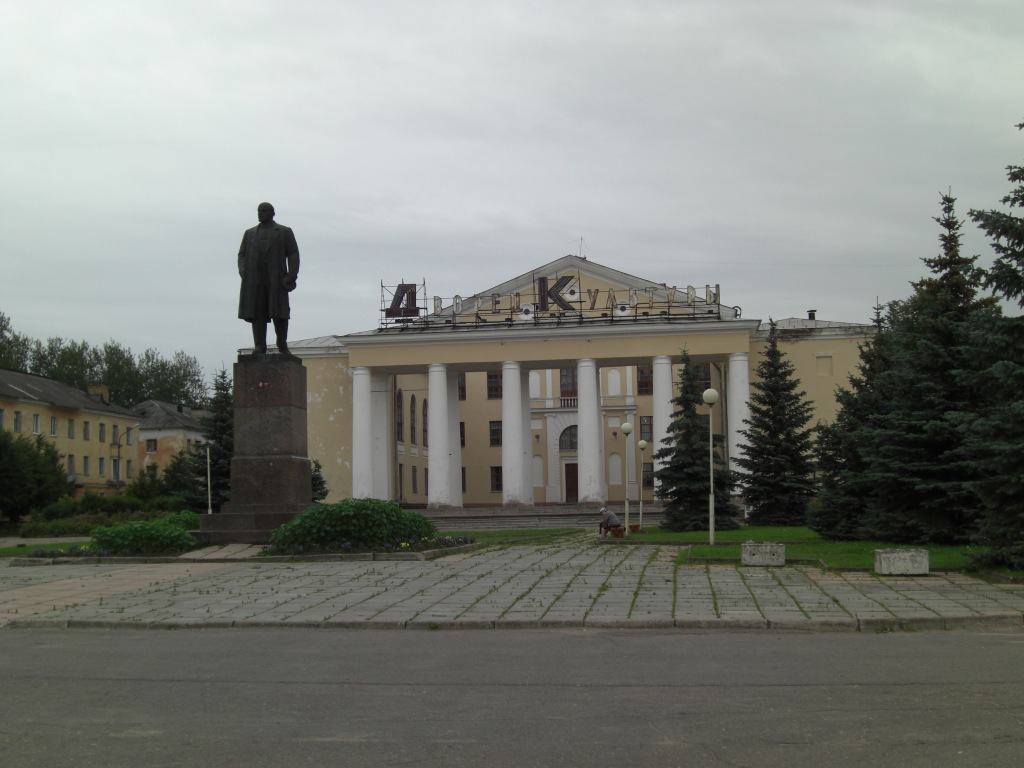
- Lenina Square in Slantsy

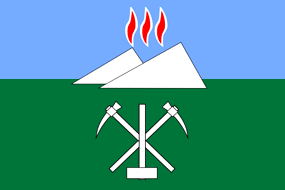
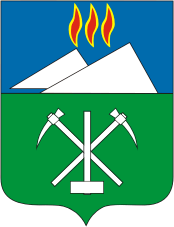
- Flag Coat of arms
- Interactive map of Slantsy
- Location of Slantsy Slantsy (Leningrad Oblast)
- Coordinates: 59°07′N 28°04′E
- Country: Russia
- Federal subject: Leningrad Oblast
- Administrative district: Slantsevsky District
- Settlement municipal formationSelsoviet: Slantsevskoye Settlement Municipal Formation
- Founded: December 20, 1934
- Town status since: April 5, 1949
- Elevation: 40 m (130 ft)

Population (2010 Census)
  - Total: 33,485
  - Estimate (2024): 33,514 (+0.1%)

Administrative status
  - Capital of: Slantsevsky District, Slantsevskoye Settlement Municipal Formation

Municipal status
  - Municipal district: Slantsevsky Municipal District
  - Urban settlement: Slantsevskoye Urban Settlement
  - Capital of: Slantsevsky Municipal District, Slantsevskoye Urban Settlement
- Time zone: UTC+3 (MSK)
- Postal codes: 188560, 188561, 188563–188565
- OKTMO ID: 41642101001
- Website: moslgp.ru

Slantsy (Russian: Сла́нцы "Oil shales") is a town and the administrative center of Slantsevsky District in Leningrad Oblast, Russia, located on the Plyussa River, 192 kilometers (119 mi) west of St. Petersburg. Population: 33,485 (2010 census); 37,371 (2002 census); 43,087 (1989 Soviet census)..

== History ==
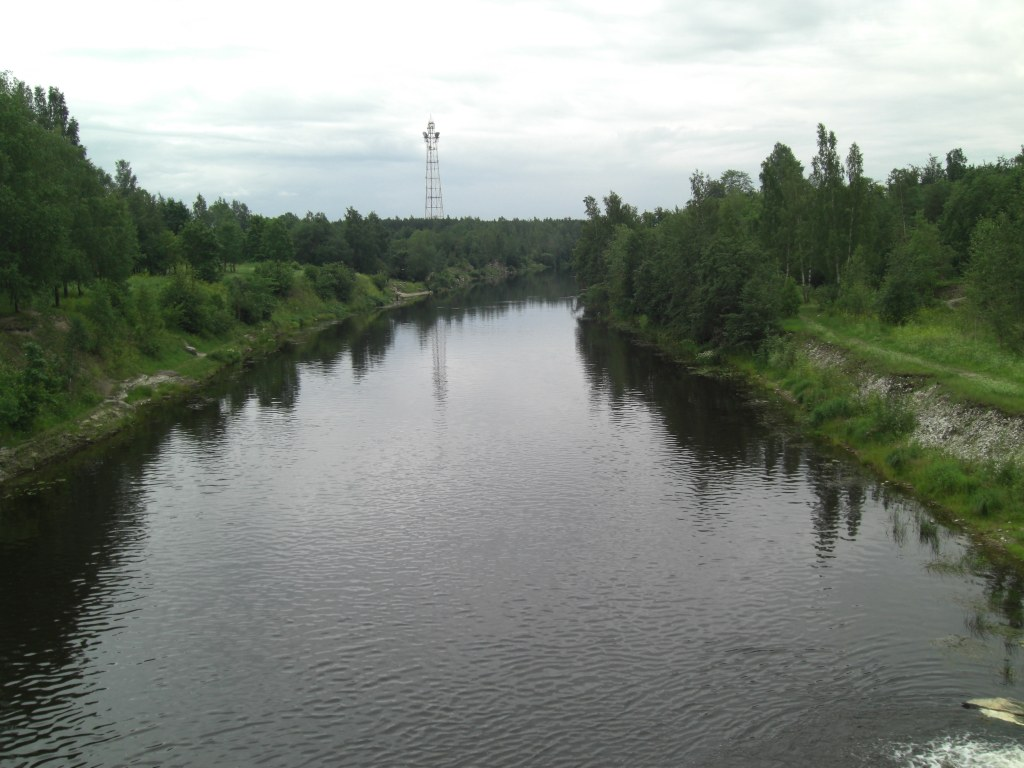
The Plyussa River in Slantsy

The creation of the settlement was proposed in 1930 by Sergey Kirov, when a large oil shale deposit was discovered in the region. The construction began in 1932. The main street was named after Kirov. On December 20, 1934, rural localities of Nikolskoye and Gavrilovskoye, then a part of Polsky Selsoviet of Gdovsky District of Leningrad Oblast, were merged to form the urban-type settlement of Slantsy.

On March 11, 1941, Slantsevsky District was split from Gdovsky District and Slantsy became the district administrative center. Between August 1941 and February 1944, Slantsy was occupied by German troops. On April 5, 1949, Slantsy was granted town status. On January 1, 1963, Slantsevsky District was abolished and split between Kingiseppsky and Luzhsky Districts. On November 3, 1965, it was re-established.

After Estonia was occupied by Soviet Union in 1940, local oil shale industry was linked with North East Estonian Soviet Socialist Republic as shale oil processing was already advanced industry before WW2. System was built so that Narva Power Plants get oil shale for electricity production from Slantsy and return it as an electricity to Russia however it became dysfunctional during the Dissolution of the Soviet Union. Issues began and by 1998 Slantsy miners did make a threat of stop railway transport between Estonia and Saint Petersburg unless their demands to increase oil shale export to Estonia. Eesti Energia, responsible on Estonia side for electricity production and importing oil shale for electricity production, refused as trade with Russian partners was based on barter deal. Eesti Energia proposed transfer to cash based transaction was not acceptable for Russian side. The cooperation broke down in April 2005 due to dispute related to the payments from Leningradslanets to Narva Power Plants. Final reason was Kyoto Protocol as Estonian side was looking to reduce the Greenhouse gas emissions and Russian side different interpretation of the related quotas. Contract between Leningradslanets & Narva Power Plants expired 31.12.2005 and it was not prolonged. In February 2006, over 1000 miners were let go and Leningrad Oblast leadership was holding meetings to solve the crisis. Negative impact was enhanced by fact that many impacted companies had unsolved questions related to the ownerships and shareholders, preventing public and private investments.

Town has long standing issues with infrastructure. In 2016 and 2018 the local sewer system froze.

== Administrative and municipal status ==
Within the framework of administrative divisions, Slantsy serves as the administrative center of Slantsevsky District. As an administrative division, it is, together with eight rural localities, incorporated within Slantsevsky District as Slantsevskoye Settlement Municipal Formation. As a municipal division, Slantsevskoye Settlement Municipal Formation is incorporated within Slantsevsky Municipal District as Slantsevskoye Urban Settlement.

== Economy ==
=== Industry ===
The town's name is the Russian word for shale. The town was largely sustained by oil shale mining by Leningradslanets mining company, as depicted on its coat of arms, and shale oil production by Zavod Slantsy. The mines are now largely closed due to decrease in local demand and disagreements over contracts with nearby Estonia. This has resulted in large-scale local unemployment. Furthermore, the disused mines present a serious ecological threat to water supplies in the region.

Additionally, there are construction industry (including cement plants), chemical industry, and food industry enterprises.

=== Transportation ===
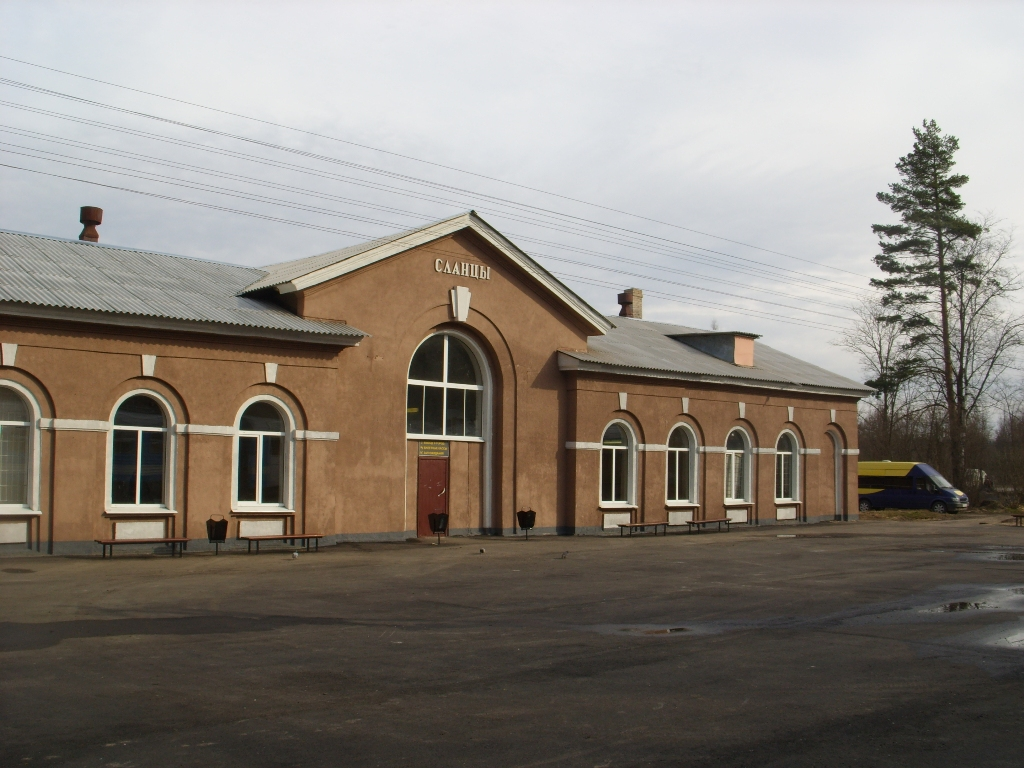
Slantsy railway station

A railway connects Slantsy with Gdov in the south and with Veymarn in the north. Originally, the railway connected Pskov with Veymarn. It was destroyed during World War II and the stretch between Gdov and Pskov was never rebuilt.

Slantsy is connected by roads with Pskov via Gdov and with Kingisepp. There are also local roads, with bus traffic originating from Slantsy.

== Culture and recreation ==
Slantsy contains four objects classified as cultural and historical heritage of local significance. Three of those commemorate events related to World War II, while the fourth one is the building of the first shale mine open in Slantsy.

The Slantsy Museum of History and Culture, focusing on the history of Slantsy, is the only state museum in Slantsevsky District.

== Notable people ==
- Larisa Peleshenko (born 1964), shot putter
- Aleksey Dmitrik (born 1984), high jumper
