= Thermoplastic road marking paint =

Powder paint used for road surface markings

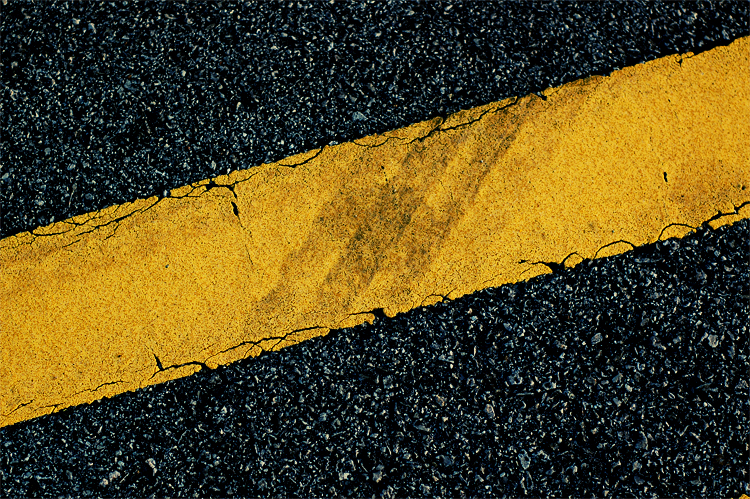
Yellow line road marking

Thermoplastic road marking paint, also called hot melt marking paint, is a kind of powder paint. When applied as road surface markings, a hot melt kettle is used to heat it to 200 °C (392 °F) to melt the powder, after which it is sprayed on the road surface. After cooling, the paint forms a thick polymer layer, which is wear-resistant, bright, and reflective. In recent years, practical applications tests have proved that the marking lines lack surface roughness and can easily cause wheel slip, resulting in a traffic crash in snow and rainy weather. Therefore, some countries once restricted the use of this paint or demand the use of anti-skid particles. In order to increase the antiskid performance of the line, thermoplastic paint has added reflective glass beads and other coarse fillers. Thermoplastic can be used very effectively for large anti-skid areas on roads and pedestrian walkways by adding glass beads. It can be produced in any colour and is suitable for car parks, factory walkways, and many other areas. It hardens quickly and can be driven over after just a few minutes.

== Components ==
Thermoplastic marking paint consists of synthetic (polymeric or non-polymeric) resin, glass beads, pigments, fillers (fine like calcium carbonate and coarse like sand), packing materials, additives, etc.

1. Synthetic resin has thermoplastic properties, making the hot melt coating fast-drying and strongly adhering to the road surface. Non-polymeric resins, based on colophony, are also widely used.
2. Additives in the paint can increase the plasticity of the coating, and make it resistant to subsidence, pollution and color fading.
3. Pigments: the common colours of road lines are yellow and white. White pigment is titanium dioxide. Occasionally zinc oxide can be used, but it is less effective due to low refractive index. For yellow thermoplastics, organic pigments (like Pigment Yellow 10, 65, 74 or 83) are mostly used; lead-containing pigments are obsolete and banned in essentially all developed countries. Thermoplastic road markings can also be formulated in other colours.
4. Packing materials, as filling added into the paint, ensure mechanical strength, wear resistance, and color of paint coating. The particle size will affect liquidity and precipitation, as well as the surface processing.
5. Glass microspheres are added in order to improve the identification of lines at night, to improve the brightness and durability of the marking. Glass beads, usually 0.1 to 1.4 mm in diameter, are colourless and transparent; they reflect light from vehicle's headlights back toward the driver and foremost protect the road marking from abrasion.

== Matched machines ==
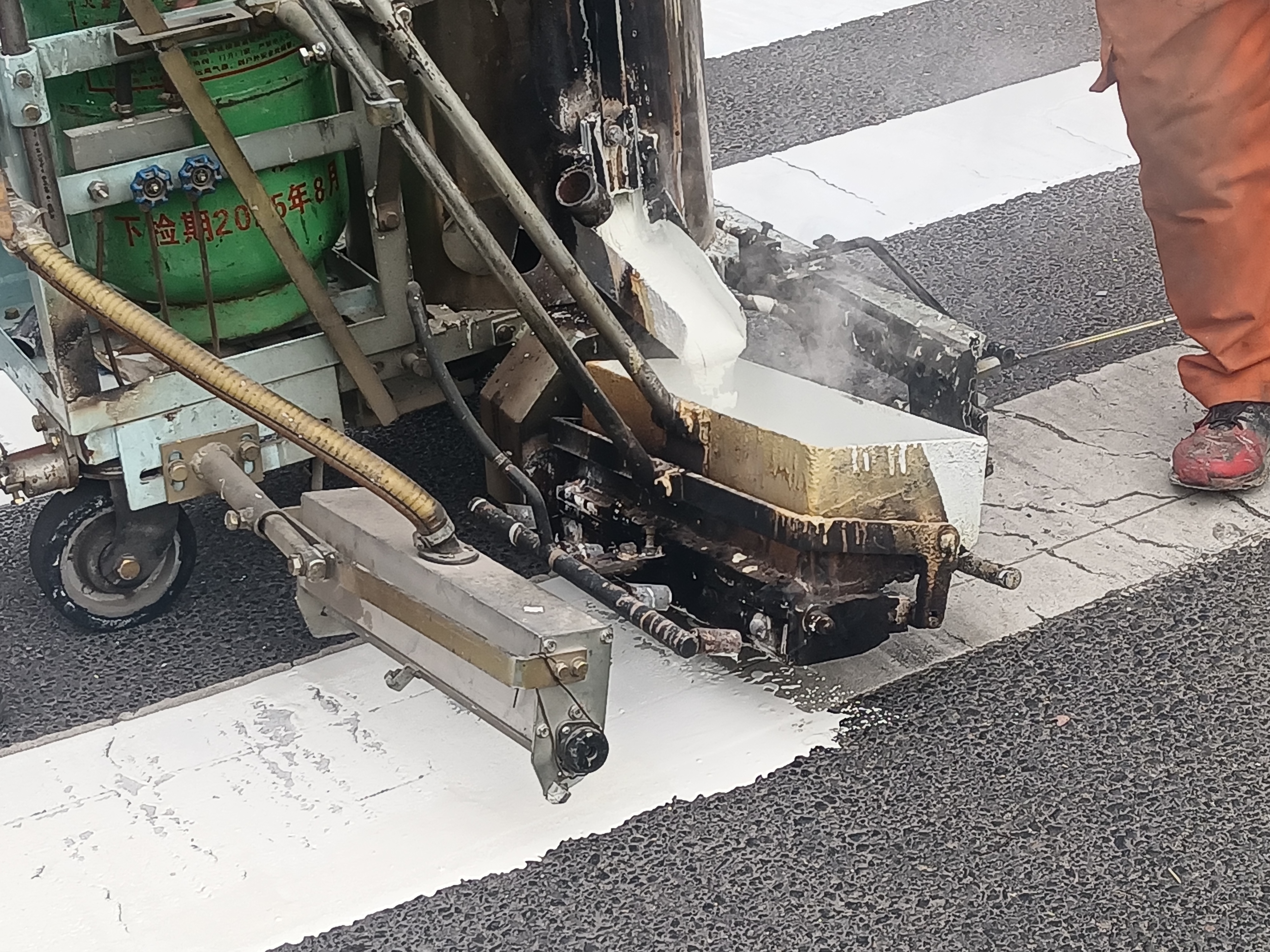
Melted high temperature paint laid covering zebra crossing. Note the LPG tank on the left used for heating the polymer.

A road marking machine is a machine specially used to mark different traffic lines on road surface, and some can remark on old lines directly. It can screed, extrude, or spray processed road paint onto the road surface to form durable coating lines. A hot melt kettle is used for continuously heating, melting, and stirring thermoplastic marking paints, preparing molten paints for the thermoplastic machine, especially for long-distance road-line-marking work. The molten paint quality can affect the line quality greatly.

=== Improving retroreflectivity via cleaning and treatment ===
Marking materials often suffer a decline in retroreflectivity over time due to abrasion, contamination and embedment of wear products. Independent field studies show that elements such as well-graded glass beads and higher-solid-content paint can raise retroreflectivity by about 10 % and extend service life significantly. In some cases, mechanical or water-based cleaning of existing markings—such as low-pressure or high-pressure water-blasting—has been reported to improve visibility and refreshing of aged markings.

== Microplastic pollution ==
Thermoplastic paints, when used as road markings, are a source of microplastic pollution. Abrasive wear of road marking paint resins has been claimed to be responsible for 7% of all microplastic pollution, with estimates ranging from 0.7% to 19%.

== See also ==
- Pedestrian crossing
- Road surface marking
- Zebra crossing
