= Goedgevonden B =

- Location within North West (South African province) Location within South Africa
- Coordinates: 26.219°S 25.525°E
- Country: South Africa
- Province: North West
- District: Ngaka Modiri Molema
- Municipality: Mafikeng

Area
  - Total: 1.27 km^{2} (0.49 sq mi)

Population (2011)
  - Total: 635
  - Density: 500/km^{2} (1,290/sq mi)

Racial makeup (2011)
  - Black African: 99.8%
  - Indian/Asian: 0.2%

First languages (2011)
  - Tswana: 97.5%
  - Other: 2.5%
- Time zone: UTC+2 (SAST)

Goedgevonden B is a town in Ngaka Modiri Molema District Municipality in the North West province of South Africa.
