= Leningradslanets =

OAO Leningradslanets
- Company type: Public (OAO)
- Industry: Mining
- Founded: 1934
- Defunct: 2013
- Headquarters: Slantsy, Leningrad Oblast, Russia
- Key people: Aleksandr Prokhorov (CEO)
- Products: Oil shale

OAO Leningradslanets (Russian: ОАО «Ленинградсланец») was an oil-shale-mining company based in Slantsy, Leningrad Oblast, Russia. The main task of Leningradslanets was to supply oil shale for Zavod Slantsy.

The company was established in 1934. At the same year, the Kirovskaya oil shale mine was opened. In 1941, during World War II the company was evacuated to Kuibyshev Oblast (now: Samara Oblast) to process the Kashpirskoye and Savelyevskoye deposits. The company was transferred back to Slantsy in 1944. In 1947, the Mine No 1 was opened, followed by the Mine No 2 in 1949 and Mine No 3 in 1953. The Kirovskaya mine reopened in 1954. In 1970, mines No 1 and No 2 were merged to create the Leningradskaya Mine. In 1974, the Kashpirskaya oil shale mine near Syzran in the Volga region was merged into Leningradslanets. The Kirovskaya Mine was closed in 1988 and the Mine No3 was merged with the Leningradskaya Mine in 2003, which was closed in 2010. The company also planned to build a new Kirosvskaya Mine and Mezdureche open pit mine.

In 2002, Leningradslanets produced 1.12 million tonnes of oil shale. After Zavod Slantsy stopped producing shale oil in 2003, oil shale was provided to Narva Power Plants until 2005. After supplies to Narva discontinued, Leningradslanets ceased its work until 2007 when the mining restarted. In 2009, it exported 40,000 tonnes of oil shale to VKG Oil. In 2006, it was announced that SK Group may buy the company; however, the deal was never agreed. In 2013, the company declared insolvency and was dissolved. At that time, more than 80% of shares of the company were controlled by Viktor Vekselberg's Renova Group.
