= Arbitration Court at Saint Petersburg Chamber of Commerce and Industry =

The Arbitration Court is an independent permanent court under the St. Petersburg Chamber of Commerce and Industry, Russia.

The Arbitration Court is engaged in settlement of economic disputes on civil matters, those to be referred to arbitration courts in accordance with Russia Law, and according to Arbitration Code of Practice of the Russian Federation, Federal Law, and according to the Law of the Russian Federation "On international commercial arbitration", intergovernmental agreements and international treaties.

The Arbitration Court is currently headed by the chairman Valery Musin, who is a board member of the St. Petersburg Chamber of Commerce and Industry, professor and the head of the chair of Civil Procedure at St. Petersburg State University, chairman of the board of directors of the Russian-British law firm “Musin and Partners”, arbitrator of the International Commercial Arbitration Court at the Chamber of Commerce and Industry of the Russian Federation, and who was repeatedly appointed as an arbitrator of the Arbitration Institute of the Stockholm Chamber of Commerce and as an expert at LCIA. Prof. Musin has over 200 scientific publications, including 12 books.

The Arbitration Court at St. Petersburg Chamber of Commerce and Industry has a number of advantages:

- independent choice of judges;
- confidentiality of arbitration proceedings and amicable settlement of disputes;
- real possibility to comply with the judgements of the Arbitration Court at St. Petersburg Chamber of Commerce and Industry on the territory of other states, which is particularly important for the participants of foreign economic relations.

== Procedures ==
An obligatory condition for referral of a dispute to the Arbitration Court is the parties' signing a documentary agreement. The parties express their manifest consent to consideration of the dispute by the Arbitration Court at St. Petersburg Chamber of Commerce and Industry at the moment of signing of the agreement.

The below stipulation must be included in the arbitration agreement, as recommended: "All disputes arising in the course of execution of the present agreement (contract) or in connection with it or following from it are subject to final settlement by the Arbitration Court in accordance with the Regulations of the said court".

The parties to the arbitration commit themselves to voluntarily comply with the judgement of the Arbitration Court. The parties and the Arbitration Court take all possible efforts for the Arbitration Court's judgement to be legally enforceable. In the event of failure to comply with the judgement of the Arbitration Court voluntarily, the enforcement procedures envisaged by the legislation of Russia are used, and as concerns the judgements on foreign trade disputes – those envisaged by international conventions.
