= Synthetic Fuels Corporation =

Quasi-public company

The logo of the now defunct Synthetic Fuels Corporation

The Synthetic Fuels Corporation (SFC or Synfuels Corporation) was a U.S. federal government-funded corporation established in 1980 by the Energy Security Act (ESA) to create a financial bridge for the development and construction of commercial synthetic fuel manufacturing plants, such as coal gasification, that would produce alternatives to imported fossil fuels. With a seven-member board of directors, the corporation received $20 billion in initial funding to be used in joint ventures with private firms, primarily oil and gas companies, to construct plants and help finance coal mines or transportation facilities. It was one of six acts in the ESA legislation.

SFC also researched and promoted the use of alcohol fuels, solar energy, and the production of fuel from urban waste.Over its 6-year existence, the SFC only spent approximately $960 million (barely five percent of its initial 1980 budget) to fund four synthetic fuels projects, none of which survive today. The corporation was abolished in April 1986.

== History ==
=== Creation ===
Initially proposed as the "Energy Security Corporation" in President Jimmy Carter's malaise speech of July 15, 1979, the corporation's funding was allocated from income from the windfall-profits tax set up in April 1980 under the Crude Oil Windfall Profit Tax Act. After long congressional conference sessions, due to heavy opposition from candidate Ronald Reagan and congressional Republicans, the ESA was finally passed in June 1980.

Congress authorized over 12 years funding of $88 billion plus $35 million in annual administrative expenses (adjusted for inflation) for the SFC, with a maximum of three hundred full-time professional employees. The SFC's mandated goal was the production of at least 500,000 barrels (79,000 m^{3}) of crude oil equivalent per day in synthetic fuels from domestic sources by 1987 and at least 2 million barrels (320,000 m^{3}) per day by 1992. The SFC was kept out of the Department of Energy and legislatively chartered to be free of normal government rules, regulations, and procedures.

In September 1980, Carter nominated John C. Sawhill to be the SFC chair, but the Senate Republicans refused to confirm Sawhill or any other board nominee. Signing Executive Order 12242, Carter assigned SFC responsibilities to the Department of Energy and Department of Defense until the SFC could be declared operational. The DoD used this brief window to fund the Union Oil Parachute Creek and Colony/Tosco oil shale projects. In October, Carter was forced to make recess appointments of Sawhill and four others. Pursuant to the ESA, the corporation had to issue its first solicitation for synthetic fuel projects by the end of December 1980; the proposal deadline was set for March 31, 1981. Sixty-one firms in 24 states submitted proposals, and of these, 19 were for coal liquefaction, 17 coal gasification, 14 oil shale, 8 tar sands oil production, and 3 for other fuels.

=== Industry response ===
Wall Street was eager to begin investing in the synfuels industry. In July 1979, a report called Helping Insure Our Energy Future: A Program for Developing Synthetic Fuel Plants Now was published by the Committee for Economic Development (CED), an independent research and educational organization of 200 business executives and educators, made the case for the urgent need for synfuel industry development. Industry lobbyists in Washington formed the National Council on Synthetic Fuels Production headed by Walter Flowers, a former Alabama congressman. No less than three trade magazines were launched — The Synfuels Report, Synfuels Weekly, and Synfuels. Two industry-insider books were quickly published, The U.S. Synthetic Fuels Program and Synfuels Handbook: Including the YELLOW PAGES of Synfuels. In the run up to the ESA's passage, the executive committee of the Ad Hoc Coalition on Synthetic Fuels hosted a reception in honor of congressmen and conference committee staff on June 19, 1980, funded by four American natural resources companies: Ashland Oil, C.-E. Lummus, Tosco, and Tenneco. These firms had significant investments in synthetic fuels projects.

=== Reagan years ===
After Ronald Reagan was elected president and Republicans took the Senate in the 1980 election, Reagan severely cut the SFC's funding, scaled it down, and finally phased it out. Constant reshuffling of members and congressional meddling succeeded in stifling the SFCs functioning. In January 1981, the board members submitted undated resignations to Reagan, and Reagan accepted them at the end of the month. Jack McAtee assumed the acting chair position. In April, Reagan nominated Edward Noble as chair in April. Edward Noble, a real-estate developer from Atlanta with roots in the Oklahoma oil business, was a large financial backer of The Heritage Foundation, which was very supportive of Reagan and paid the salaries of several SFC transition team members.

In May, Reagan nominated four transition members, Robert Monks, Victor Schroeder, Victor Thompson, and Howard Wilkins, to the SFC board. After Noble was confirmed and sworn into office, McAtee resigned. In October, the other four board nominees were sworn in as members of the board. Finally, in February 1982, Reagan issued Executive Order 12346 proclaiming the SFC operational and officially open for business. In May, Reagan appointed two additional SFC board members, John Carter and Milton Masson, who were not sworn in until August.

In August 1983, the SFC president and CEO, Schroeder, resigned his position but remained a board member. Over the course of several months, starting in January 1984, five members, Monks, Wilkins, Schroeder, Thompson, and Carter, resigned. Not until November were three replacements, Corcoran, MacAvoy, and Reichl, appointed and in December sworn in as board members. They were not confirmed by the Senate until June 1985.

Hollowed out and neutered, the SFC instead became a place to repay political donors and friends with do-nothing job appointments. This was then used as a pretext to abolish the SFC. In December, Congress passed P.L. 99-190 which terminated SFC authority to award new financial assistance and set a 120-day time limit left to transfer projects to the Treasury department and to shut down. In April 1986, Congress passed P.L. 99-272 formally abolishing the SFC.

== Assessment ==
The Great Plains coal gasification plant in Beulah, North Dakota, still producing natural gas and sequestering carbon in 2009, was built with the support of the Department of Energy and applied for further support by this corporation, partly as a result of efforts by Reagan's Energy Secretary James B. Edwards.

== See also ==
- Colony Shale Oil Project
- Dakota Gasification Company
- Synthetic Liquid Fuels Program
