= Colony Shale Oil Project =

Oil shale development project in Colorado, US

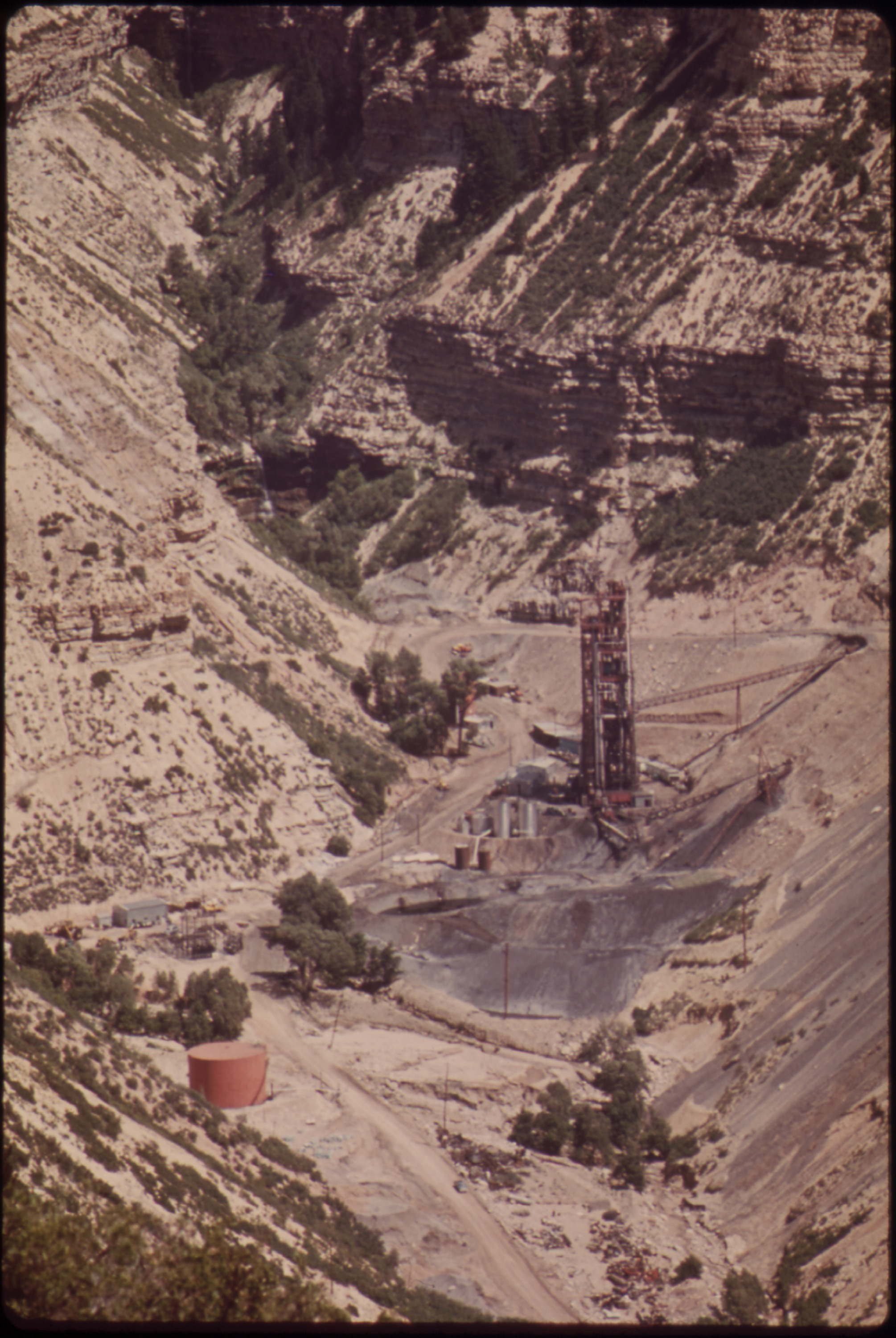
The Colony oil shale development site in August 1973.

Colony Shale Oil Project was an oil shale development project at the Piceance Basin near Parachute Creek, Colorado. The project consisted of an oil shale mine and pilot-scale shale oil plant, which used the TOSCO II retorting technology, developed by Tosco Corporation. Over time the project was developed by a consortium of different companies until it was terminated by Exxon on 2 May 1982 a day which is known amongst locals as "Black Sunday".

== History ==
The project started in 1964 when Tosco, Standard Oil of Ohio, and Cleveland Cliffs Iron Company formed the Colony Development joint venture. The aim of the newly formed joint venture was to develop the Colony Oil Shale Project and to commercialize the TOSCO II technology. Starting in 1965 the consortium operated a shale oil pilot plant and in 1968 the Colony Development started preparations to build a commercial-scale plant.

In 1969 Atlantic Richfield Company joined the project acquiring part of Tosco's stake. However the commercial project was delayed by economic uncertainties and then resurrected in the 1970s after the Arab oil embargo. In 1972 the consortium stopped the pilot plant and the development of the commercial plant was suspended in November 1974 when more detailed economic studies indicated a more than three times higher cost than previously anticipated.

In 1974 Ashland Oil and Shell Oil Company joined the project. In the late 1970s Standard Oil of Ohio, Cleveland Cliffs Iron Company, Shell and Ashaland Oil sold their shares to Atlantic Richfield Company. As a result of these transactions Tosco owned 40% of shares and Atlantic Richfield Company owned 60% of shares in the project.

In 1980 Atlantic Richfield Company sold its share to Exxon for $300 million. In 1981 the Colony Development started a construction of the commercial scale shale oil plant. On 2 May 1982 Exxon announced the termination of the project because of low oil-prices and increased expenses laying off more than 2,000 workers resulting in the date becoming known among locals as "Black Sunday". According to the shareholders agreement in a case of project termination Exxon had an obligation to buy out Tosco's shares. It paid $380 million worth of compensation.

During its existence the project produced 270 thousand barrels (43×10^{3} m^{3}) of shale oil.

== Location ==
The Colony Development's property located in the southern edge of the Piceance Basin in northwestern Colorado, approximately 200 miles (320 km) west of Denver. It located next to the Union Shale Oil property, developed by Unocal Corporation.

== Technical description ==
The pilot stage of the project consisted of underground room-and-pillar type oil shale mine and aboveground shale oil pilot plant with input capacity of 1,000 ton of oil shale per day which used TOSCO II retort a horizontal rotating kiln-type retort classified as a hot recycled solids technology. Mining was conducted in a 60 ft (18 m)-thick portion of the Mahogany Zone in the Parachute Creek Member of the Green River Formation at depths of 860 ft (260 m) and 600 ft (180 m) by a one-bench system. Pillar dimensions were 58 ft (18 m) by 58 ft (18 m) and rooms were 55 ft (17 m) wide.

The planned commercial scale plant was to contain six TOSCO II retorts with total input capacity of 66,000 ton of oil shale per day. The proposed plant was to produce about 46,000 bbl (7,300 m^{3}) of shale oil per day. The project was also to consists of shale oil upgrading plant for hydrogen treating to remove nitrogen and sulfur compounds. This plant was scheduled to produce about 17 million barrels (2.7×10^{6} m^{3}) of premium petroleum products, 52,000 long ton of sulfur, and 41,000 long tons of ammonia per year. At the moment of cancellation the estimated costs would exceed $5.5 billion in then-year dollars or about $10 billion in 2005 dollars.

== See also ==
- History of the oil shale industry in the United States
- Rio Blanco Oil Shale Company
