= Rio Blanco Oil Shale Company =

American oil technology R&D company

The Rio Blanco Oil Shale Company was an American shale oil extraction technology research and development company. The company was established as a general partnership of Gulf Oil (now part of Chevron Corporation) and Standard Oil of Indiana (now part of BP). It was named after the Rio Blanco County, Colorado, the location of the company's oil shale tract.

The Rio Blanco Oil Shale Company was established in 1974. In 1974, it won a bid for Federal Oil Shale Lease C-a in the Rio Blanco County. In 1977, the company started preparations to demonstrate its modified in-situ extraction process. The demonstration program included construction of two in-situ retorts using company-developed techniques for rubbling and ignition of the oil shale deposit, and operation the process through surface drill holes. The mining and blasting (3 simultaneous, underground, nuclear explosions) used in this process created a bed with close to 40% porosity. This enabled to retort the chimney at a substantially faster rate achieving higher oil yields. The first retort ignited in October 1980 and the second one in June 1981. The demonstration achieved an average oil yield of 68% of Fischer Assay. The demonstration program cost $132 million.

Later the company acquired the modified in-situ technology developed by Occidental Petroleum. The major difference between the two technologies lay in methods for rubblizing and fractioning of the shale deposit. The company also obtained a license for using the Lurgi-Ruhrgas process.

In 1985, Amoco (former Standard Oil of Indiana) took control over the company acquiring Gulf Oil's take from the Chevron Corporation. In the same year, the company ceased its operations.

== See also ==
- History of the oil shale industry in the United States
