= Tosco Corporation =

American oil company, 1955–2001

Tosco
- Industry: petroleum
- Founded: 1955 in Santa Monica, California
- Fate: Merged with Phillips Petroleum (ConocoPhillips)
- Headquarters: Stamford, Connecticut

Tosco (from "The Oil Shale Corporation") was an independent US-based petroleum refining and marketing corporation based in Stamford, Connecticut. It was founded in 1955 in Santa Monica, California by A&P heir Huntington Hartford, and originally focused on extracting oil from oil shale and developing alternative energy sources.

Tom O'Malley bought a quarter of the business and assumed the CEO role in 1989. He built TOSCO into the largest independent refiner in the United States prior to merging the company into Phillips 66 in 2001.

== History ==
In 1964 Tosco, Standard Oil of Ohio, and Cleveland Cliffs Iron Company formed Colony Development, a joint venture company to develop the Colony Oil Shale Project in Colorado and to commercialize the TOSCO II technology. In 1969, ARCO joined the project. The project was ended in April 1972.

In 1976 the company name was shortened to Tosco after the company acquired the Avon Refinery in Martinez, California, and other west coast facilities from Phillips Petroleum, making it a major player in petroleum refining. The company continued its efforts in oil shale extraction until May 2, 1982, when Exxon (which had bought Atlantic Richfield's 60% share in the project in 1980) pulled out of the Colony Project joint venture, leaving Tosco unable to keep the venture viable in spite of a $1.1 million loan guarantee from the U.S. government. Exxon claimed the project's projected $6 billion price tag made the project no longer feasible, but Exxon was required to purchase Tosco's 40% share in the project as a result of their withdrawal.

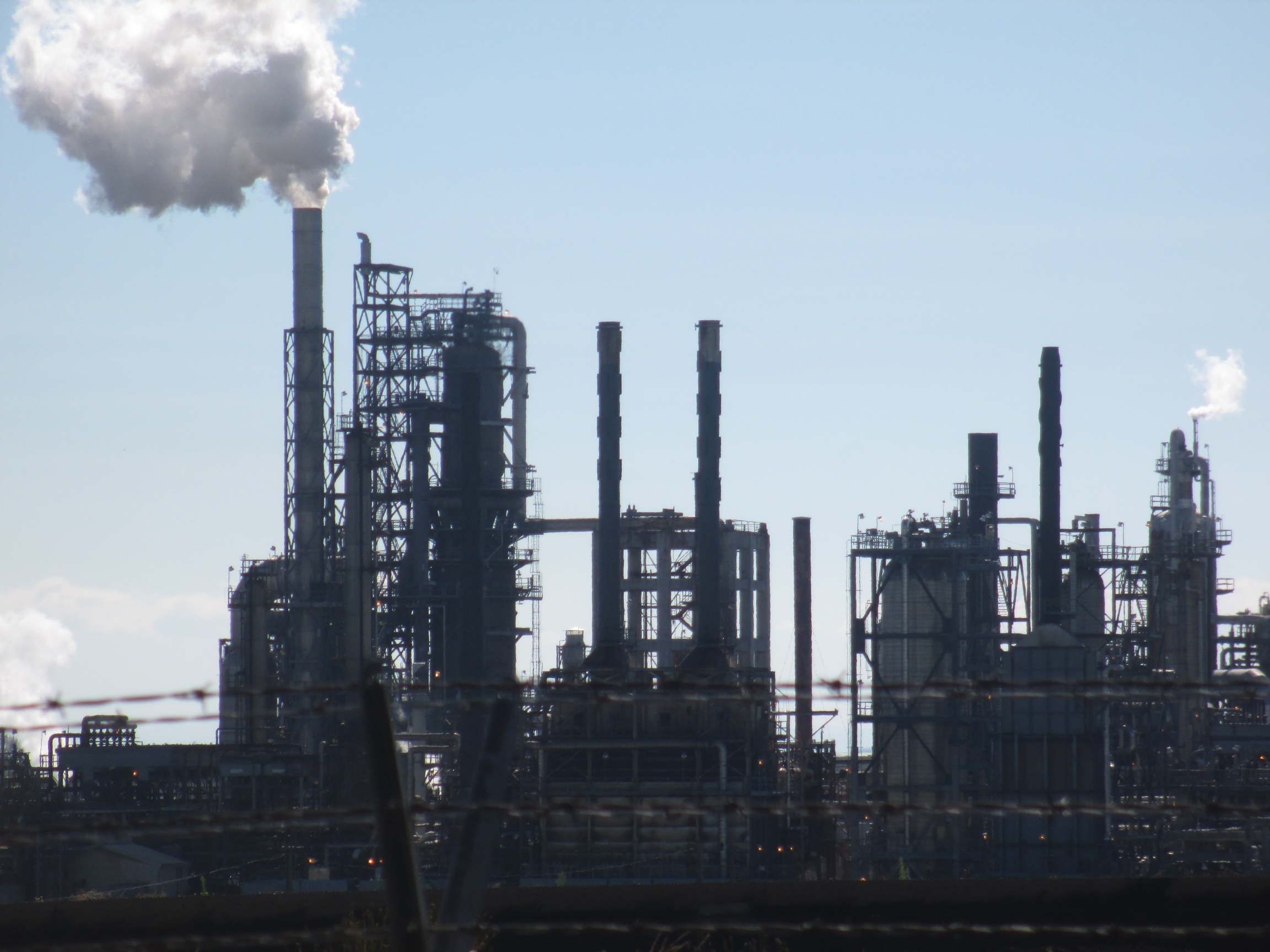
A Tosco Refinery near Ferndale, WA.

A major company reorganization followed in 1983. Several takeover bids during the 1980s failed to materialize, and another major reorganization took place in 1987, with Tom O'Malley purchasing a 26% equity position, assuming the chairmanship, and later moving the company's headquarters to Stamford, Connecticut.

In 1996, Tosco acquired the Circle K chain of convenience stores. In 1997, Tosco bought the rights to the Union 76 brand of gas stations and the western United States refining and marketing operations from Unocal. Tosco merged with Phillips Petroleum in 2001. Phillips merged with Conoco in 2002 to become ConocoPhillips, who spun off the Circle K stores to Canadian-based Alimentation Couche-Tard.

== 1999 refinery accident ==
On February 23, 1999, four workers at the Avon Refinery in Concord were burned to death after they tried to replace a leaky oil pipe. The San Francisco Chronicle reported that one Tosco employee, Anthony Creggett, claimed shortly after the fire that plant managers had refused a request by four workers to shut down the high-temperature distillation tower during the repairs on the pipe.

== 2001 refinery fire ==
In spring 2001, local gas prices spiked after a fire at a Tosco plant in Carson, California, south of Los Angeles, that released toxic smoke visible 90 miles away.
