= Union process =

Shale oil extraction technnology

- Process type: Chemical
- Industrial sector(s): Chemical industry oil industry
- Feedstock: oil shale
- Product(s): shale oil
- Leading companies: Unocal Corporation
- Inventor: Unocal Corporation

The Union process was an above ground shale oil extraction technology for production of shale oil, a type of synthetic crude oil. The process used a vertical retort where heating causes decomposition of oil shale into shale oil, oil shale gas and spent residue. The particularity of this process is that oil shale in the retort moves from the bottom upward to the top, countercurrent to the descending hot gases, by a mechanism known as a rock pump. The process technology was invented by the American oil company Unocal Corporation in late 1940s and was developed through several decades. The largest oil shale retort ever built was the Union B type retort.

== History ==
Union Oil Company of California (Unocal) started its oil shale activities in 1920s. In 1921, it acquired an oil shale tract in the Parachute Creek area of Colorado, southern Piceance Basin. The development of the Union process began in the late 1940s, when the Union A retort was designed. This technology was tested between 1954 and 1958 at the company-owned tract in the Parachute Creek. During these tests, up to 1,200 tonne per day of oil shale was processed, resulting of 800 barrels per day (130 m^{3}/d) shale oil, which was refined at a Colorado refinery. More than 13,000 barrels (2,100 m^{3}) of gasoline and fuels were produced. This production was finally shut down in 1961 due to cost.

In 1974, the Union B process, evolved from the Union A process, was developed. In 1976, Union announced its plans to build a Union B demonstration plant. Construction started in 1981 at Long Ridge in Garfield County, Colorado, and the plant was started its operations in 1986. It was closed in 1991 after production of 5 million barrels (790×10^{3} m^{3}) shale oil.

== Process ==
The Union process can be operated in two different combustion modes, which are direct and indirect. The Union A (direct) process is similar to the gas combustion retort technology, classified as an internal combustion method, while the Union B (indirect) process is classified as an externally generated hot gas method.

The Union retort is a vertical shaft retort. The main difference to other vertical shaft retorts such as Kiviter, Petrosix, Paraho and Fushun is that crushed oil shale is fed through the bottom of the retort rather than the top. Lumps of oil shale in size of 3.2 to 50.8 millimetres (0.13 to 2.00 in) are moved upwards through the retort by a solids pump (known as a "rock pump"). Hot gases, generated by internal combustion or circulated through the top of the retort, decompose the oil shale while descending. The pyrolysis occurs at the temperature of 510 °C (950.0 °F) to 540 °C (1,004.0 °F). Condensed shale oil and gases are removed from the retort at the bottom. Part of the gases is recirculated for pyrolysis and fueling combustion, while other part could be used as product gas. The spent shale is removed from the top of the retort. After cooling with a water, it is conveyed to the waste disposal.

== Advantages ==
The Union retort design has several advantages. The reducing atmosphere in the retort allows the removal of sulfur and nitrogen compounds through the formation of hydrogen sulfide and ammonia. Oil vapors are cooled by the raw oil, thus minimizing polymer formation among the hydrocarbon fractions.

== See also ==
- Alberta Taciuk Process
- Galoter process
- Fushun process
- Kiviter process
- Lurgi-Ruhrgas process
- Paraho process
- Petrosix
- TOSCO II process
- Superior multimineral process
