= Landship =

Large land vehicle

A landship is a large vehicle that travels on land. Its name distinguishes it from those which travel on or through other mediums such as conventional ships, airships, and spaceships.

== Military ==
=== Tanks ===
==== Origins ====
The British Landship Committee formed during World War I to develop armored vehicles for use in trench warfare. The British proposed building "landships," super-heavy tanks capable of crossing the trench systems of the Western Front. The committee originated from the armored car division of the Royal Naval Air Service. It gained the notable support of Winston Churchill.

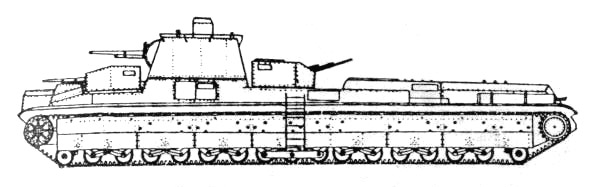
Schematic for the T-42 Soviet tank

The tank was originally referred to as the landship, owing to the continuous development from the Landship Committee. The concept of a 1,000-ton armored, fighting machine on land quickly became too impractical and too costly for it to be realistically conceived. As such, the landship project proposed a smaller vehicle. The first conceptual tank prototype was for a 300-ton vehicle that would be made by suspending a "sort of Crystal Palace body" between three enormous wheels, allegedly inspired by the Great Wheel at Earls Court in London. Six of these 'Big Wheel' landships were eventually commissioned. However, even at a revised weight, 300 tons was considered impractical given the technology present, but the influence of the big wheel would persist in the "creeping grip" tracks of the first tanks, which were wrapped around the entire body of the machine.

==== Mark I tank ====
The constant revision eventually led to the creation of the first tank. The Mark I and later variations were smaller than the initial behemoths engineers envisioned but still used naval guns, including the QF 6-pounder Hotchkiss, later shortened to the QF 6-pounder guns.

==== Super-heavy tank ====
Super-heavy tanks are massive tanks, concepts of which led to gargantuan vehicles akin to naval warships. Super-heavy tanks such as the British TOG 2 and the Soviet T-42 were designed with a similar layout as naval battleships, albeit on a smaller scale.

==== T-35 ====
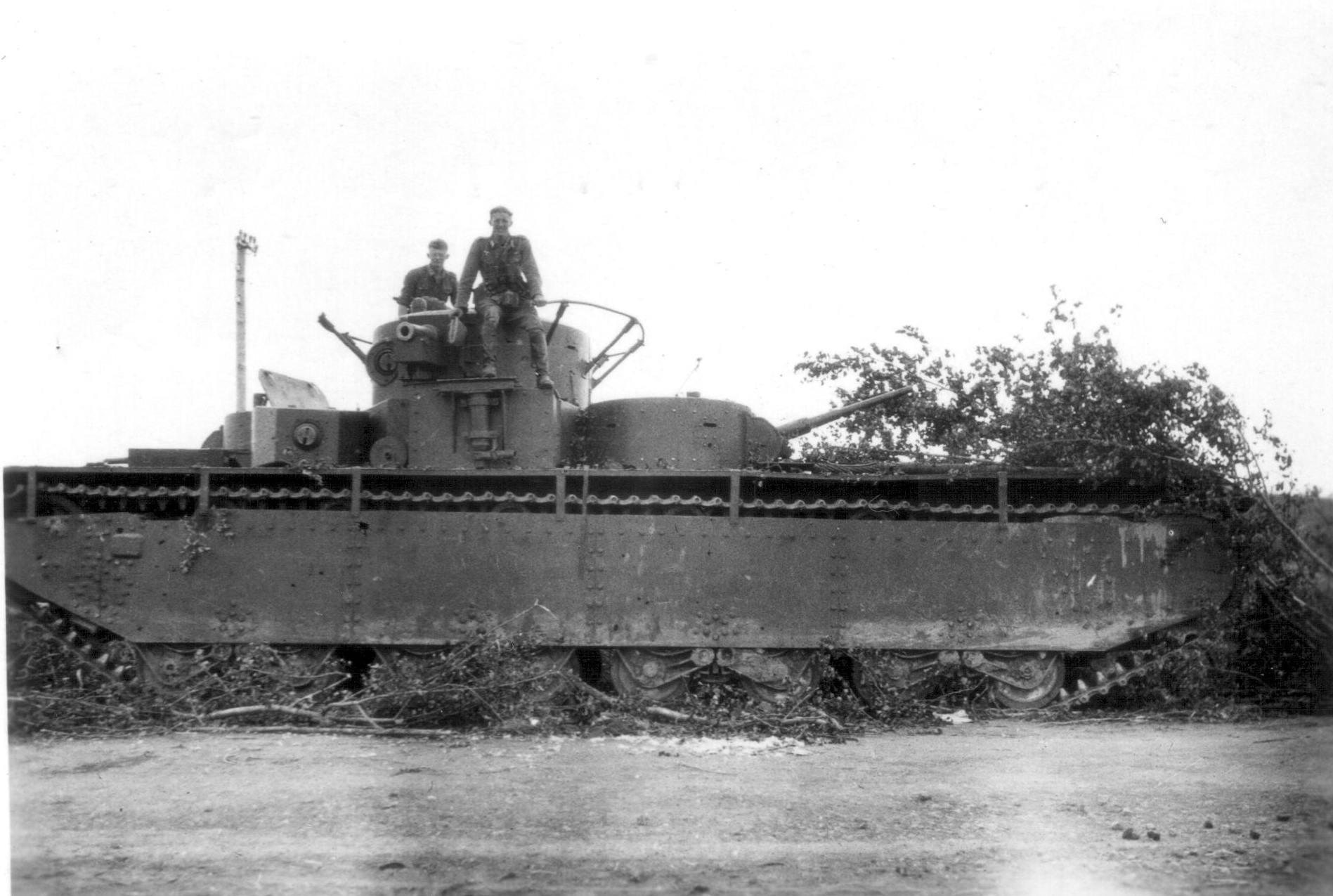
German troops posing on a captured T-35

The T-35 was a Soviet multi-turreted heavy tank. Nicknamed the "Land Battleship," it continues to be one of few armored historical vehicles named as such. Most of them were captured in late June 1941 by the Germans.

==== Panzerkampfwagen VIII Maus ====
The Maus was a German super-heavy tank from the 2nd World War, weighing in at 188 tons. It was the heaviest tank ever built. Although 141 were ordered, only one finished prototype and one partially finished prototype were in working order by the end of the war due to the Allies bombing the only factory capable of producing the tank.

An artist depiction of the Landkreuzer P. 1000, with a size comparison to Maus and Tiger I

==== Landkreuzer P.1000 ====
The Landkreuzer P.1000 was a super-heavy tank designed by Edward Grote for Nazi Germany in 1942. If completed, the P.1000 would have been 35 meters (115 feet) long and 14 meters (46 feet) wide, with an estimated weight of 800 to 1,000 tons depending on the variant. The latest variant would have been armed with twin 28 cm guns housed in a central turret and two turrets with twin 12.8 cm cannons mounted towards the front of the hull.

=== Other ===
==== Siege towers ====
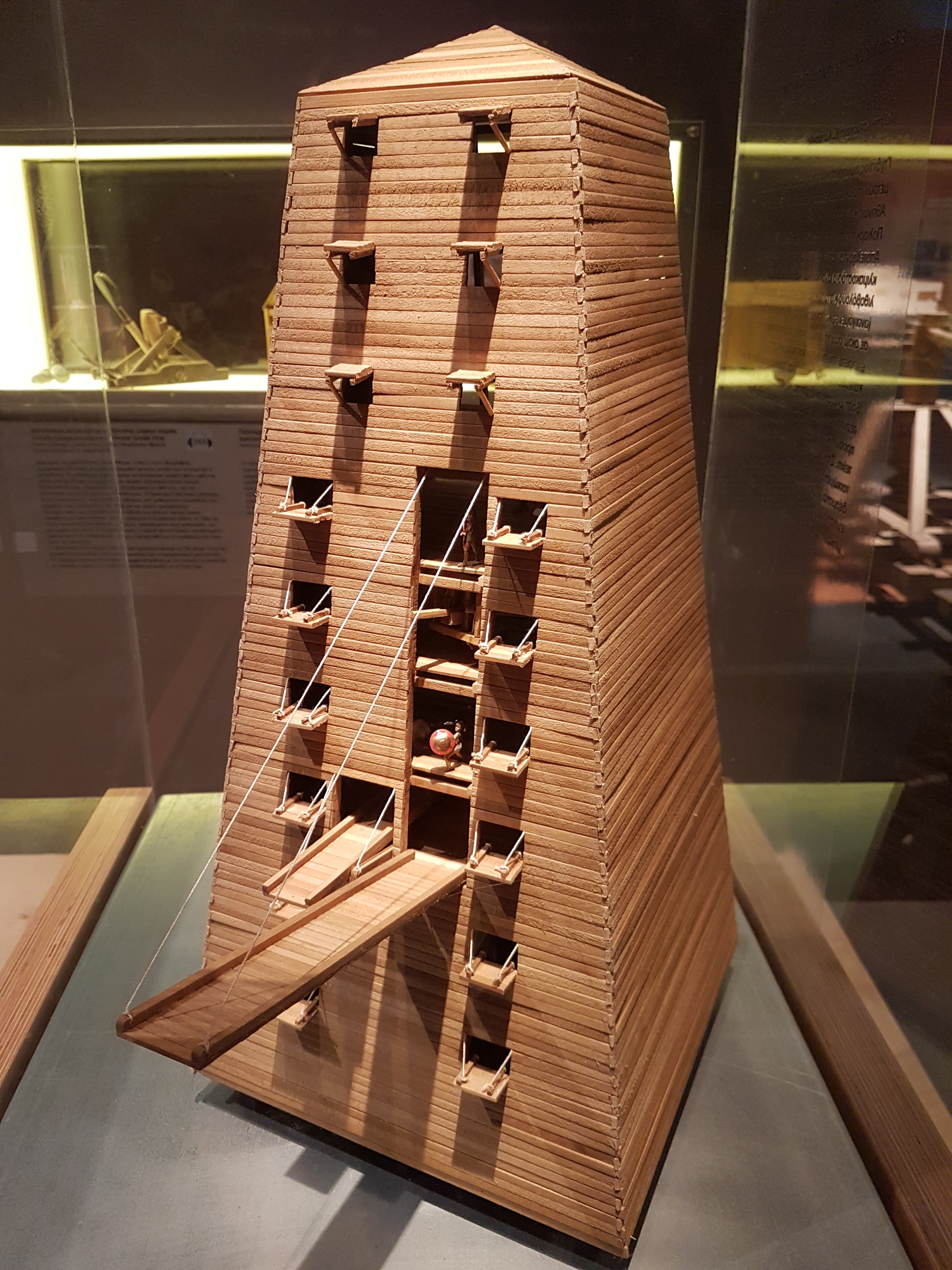
The Helepolis was the largest of the siege towers.

Siege towers were ancient forms of superheavy ground vehicles and siege engines that grew in prominence during the ancient world right up to the Renaissance. They required dozens of men or beasts of burden to move their bulk. They were exceptionally tall, had multiple decks, staircases and ladders, and some were armed internally with emplaced weapons such as ballistas, catapults or onagers and cannons. The largest of them all was the ancient Helepolis, a superheavy siege tower from ancient Greece that was 40 meters tall, 20 meters wide, 160 tons in weight and required a crew of 3,400 men. By definition, siege towers were effectively the medieval equivalent of a ground-based attack transport troopship.

==== Armoured trains ====
Even though they are technically a conglomeration of individual vehicles, armoured trains are often the closest one would get to a modern landship design. Armoured trains are often extraordinarily fast for their size and commonly measure over a hundred meters long carrying hundreds of passengers. Likewise, armoured trains are incredibly variable and often used as a mobile headquarters on rails. They are powerful enough to mount naval weapons, with many railroad guns being comparable to actual naval calibers. Like ships, the majority of armoured trains were often christened with a name. Currently, the only country utilizing armoured trains in the modern era is Russia, where it is used more akin to a land-base landing ship on rails as of December 2023.

==== Schwerer Gustav ====
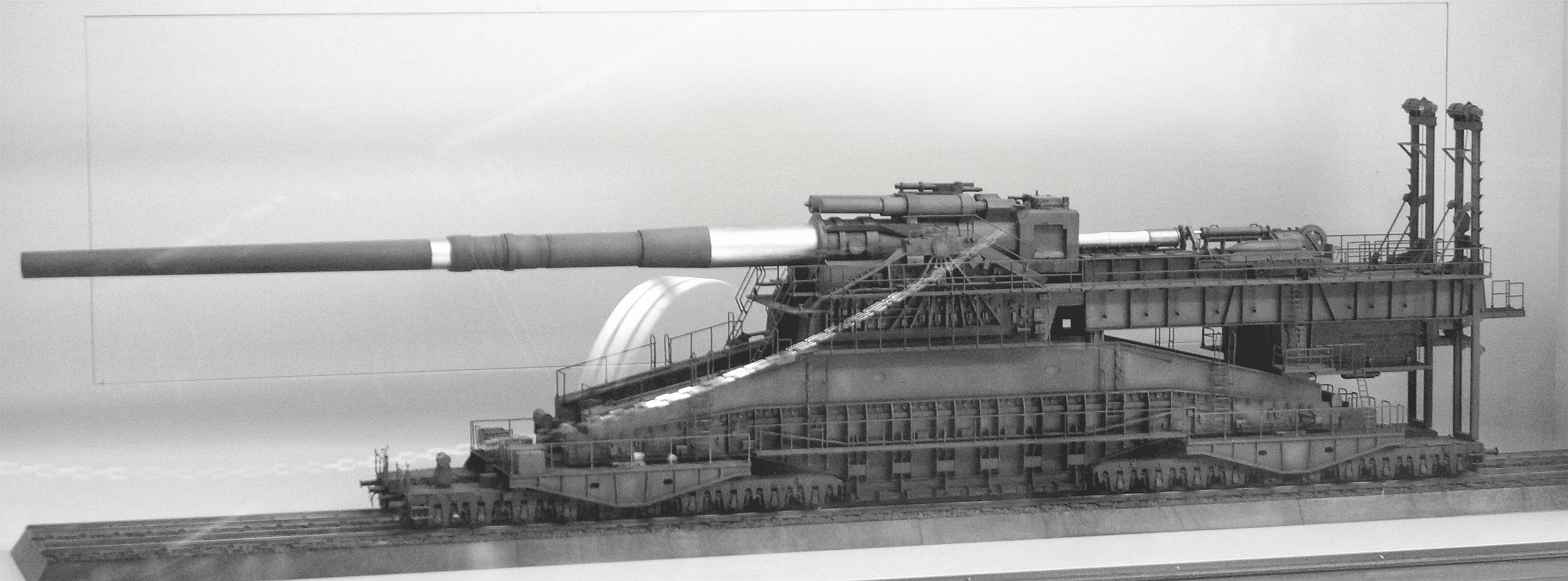
Model of Dora, sister railway gun of Schwerer Gustav.

Schwerer Gustav was a German super-heavy railway gun developed in the late 1930s. It was the largest caliber rifled weapon ever used in combat and, in terms of overall weight, the heaviest mobile artillery piece ever built. With a length of 47.3 meters (155 feet, 2 inches), a width of 7.1 meters (23 feet, 4 inches) and a height of 11.6 meters (38 feet, 1 inch), the Schwerer Gustav weighed 1,350 tonnes. The gun's massive size required its own diesel-powered generator, a special railway track and an oversized crew of 2,750 (250 to assemble and fire the gun in 3 days and 2,500 to lay the tracks). By definition, the Schwerer Gustav would have qualified as a landship, albeit one limited to rails.

==== Zubr-class LCAC ====
Extremely large hovercraft such as the Zubr-class LCAC used by both the Russian Navy and the PLAN could also technically cover some aspect of landship design by factor of it being also capable of traversing overland as a partial-terrestrial vehicle. At over 50 meters long with a max tonnage weight of 555 tons, it is the closest one could get to a modern military landcraft, although it is more of an amphibious hovership than anything else.

== Civilian ==
The vast majority of the world's largest terrestrial vehicles come from the engineering and mining sector. As their role involves the collection of vast underground resources in large bulk, their physical dimensions dramatically increased to accommodate the transferral of those materials and easily dwarf any other ground vehicles by several orders of magnitude. These vehicles listed are:

=== Antarctic Snow Cruiser ===
An unsuccessful vehicle designed to explore Antarctica.

=== Bucket-wheel excavators ===
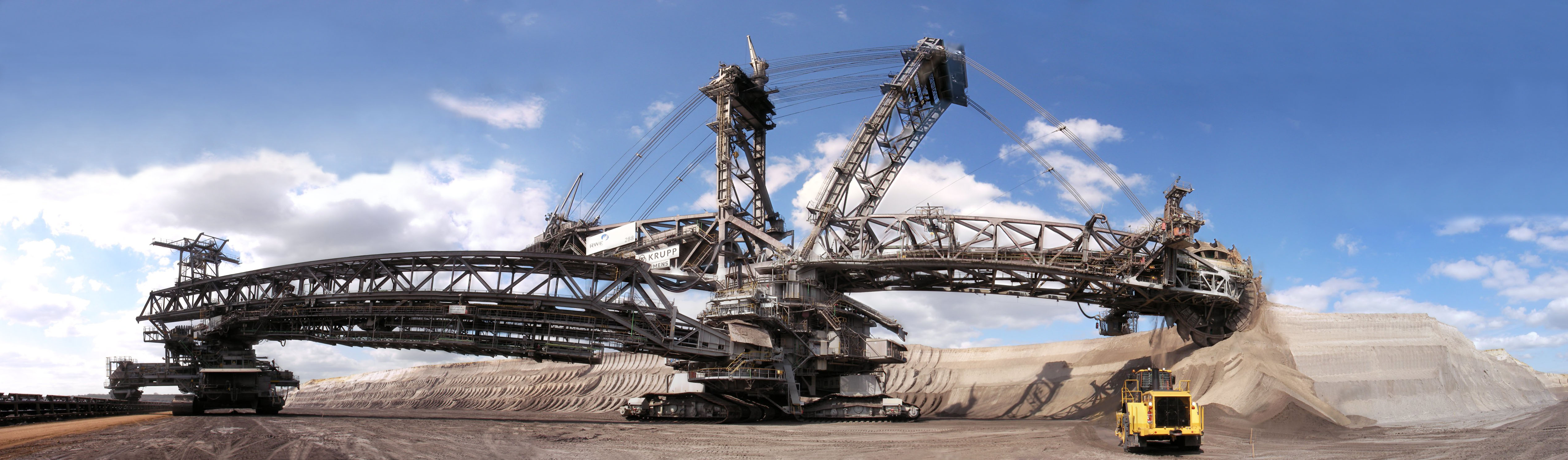
The Bagger 288 bucket-wheel excavator

A large civilian mining vehicle. Their large size are compared to ocean liners on land. The SRs 8000-class or Type SRs 8000 bucket-wheel excavators (of which Bagger 293, the lead SRs 8000, is the heaviest land vehicle ever made) remain the only ground vehicle to be referred with a naval classification.

=== Conveyor bridges ===
Large mining vehicles used in open-pit mining. The Overburden Conveyor Bridge F60 is considered the largest vehicle in physical dimensions of any type and has been referred to as a "lying Eiffel Tower."

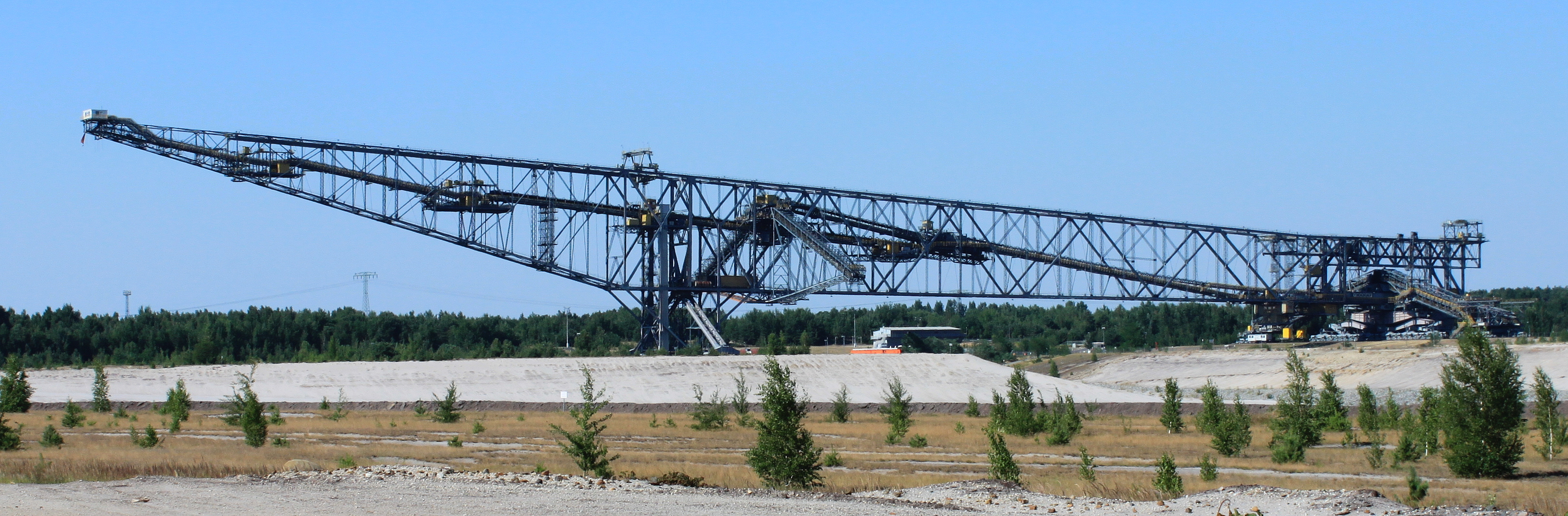
The Overburden Conveyor Bridge F60 is one of the largest terrestrial vehicles by any physical dimensions.

=== Bucket chain excavators ===
Similar in size to bucket-wheel excavators and used in surface mining and dredging, the largest of which are the Type Es 3750s.

=== Dragline excavators ===
Massive excavators that move by "walking" on two, pneumatic feet. The Big Muskie was one of the largest terrestrial vehicles ever built.

=== Superheavy power shovels ===
Extremely large power shovels – The Captain rivaled bucket-wheel excavators and dragline excavators in sheer size.

=== Spreaders ===
Spreaders are incredibly large ground vehicles that are meant to 'spread' overburden into a neat, consistent and orderly manner. They closely resemble both a bucket-wheel excavator and a stacker in appearance. They are identifiable by their long discharge boom which can range as long as 195 meters in length.

=== Stackers ===
Stackers are mining vehicles that exclusively run on rails and are imposing in size, with some stacker-reclaimer hybrids having a boom length of 25 to 60 meters. These vehicles may resemble a spreader, however, a stacker's role is to pile bulk material onto a stockpile so that a reclaimer could collect and redistribute the materials. Stackers, therefore, often work in conjunction with reclaimers.

=== Reclaimers ===
Reclaimers are mining vehicles that, like stackers, run exclusively on rails. Reclaimers are traditionally very wide vehicles that come in various shapes and types; from bridge reclaimers to overarching portal reclaimers and the bucket-wheel reclaimers which superficially resemble a bucket-wheel excavator in appearance. Reclaimers, as its name implies, 'reclaim' bulk material such as ores and cereals from a stockpile dumped by a stacker and are quite large, with bucket-wheel types usually having a boom length of 25 to 60 meters. As such, these two vehicles often work in conjunction with each other.

=== Tunnel boring machines ===
Large underground vehicles designed to drill and create subterranean subway transits, some of which weigh about 5,000 tons.

=== NASA crawler-transporter ===
An ultra-heavy transporter used to ferry spacecraft to the launching pad. At 2,000 tons each, they are the second largest ground vehicle that still use an internal combustion engine as its source of propulsion rather than being reliant on an external power source.

=== Gantry cranes and container cranes ===
Mobile gantry cranes and container cranes are notable for their large, imposing size and dimensions with weights varying from 900 tons up to 2000 tons. These vehicles are either driven by wheels or rails and require a small crew for their size. The largest gantry cranes such as Samson and Goliath are some of the largest movable land machines in the world, with the Honghai Crane being the largest and the most powerful of its kind at 150m tall, a span of 124m and the total weight of 11,000 tons, with the strength to lift up to 22,000 tons.

=== Ultraheavy crawler cranes ===
Certain crawler cranes are known to reach gargantuan size. Whilst not the same extant as gantry or container cranes, the very largest, such as the XGC88000 crawler crane remains the largest self-propelled ground vehicle to date, beating out the crawler-transporters in both gross tonnage and sheer dimensions.

== Design concepts ==
- The Walking City – A form of drivable arcologies.
- Breitspurbahn – A proposed civilian railway line envisioned by Adolf Hitler. These super enlarged transit lines would have accommodated ultra-wide trains that would be 500 meters (1,640 feet) long.

== Parades and events ==
- Barbados Landship – A Barbadian cultural tradition and event that mimics the British Navy.

== Fictional examples ==
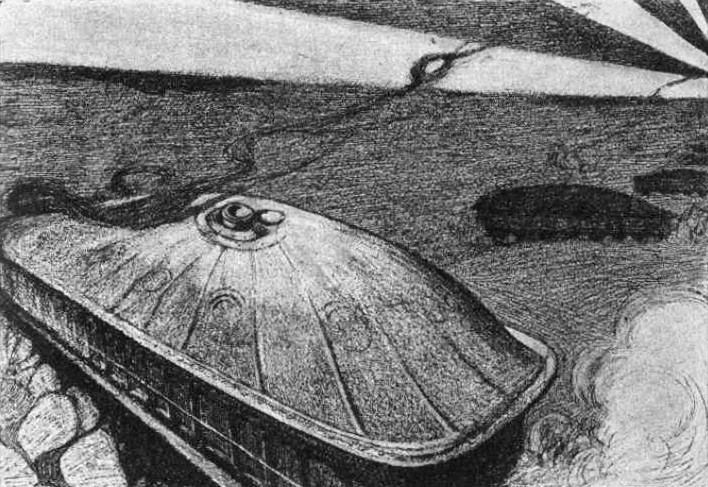
1904 illustration of H. G. Wells' The Land Ironclads, showing huge ironclad land vessels, equipped with pedrail wheels

- An early example of the landship concept occurred in "The Land Ironclads," written in 1903 by science fiction author H. G. Wells.
- In the Mortal Engines series, large landships called "traction cities" hunt smaller vehicles in the practicing of "Municipal Darwinism."
- In Homeworld: Deserts of Kharak, literal land-bound aircraft carriers and land battleships are the primary mode of transporting firepower and air power in the largely desert terrain of the world of Kharak.
- In Warhammer 40,000, large land battleships, including the Capitol Imperialis and the Colossus, battle giant mechs known as Titans.
- The Halo franchise used large, terrestrial vehicles, including the Mammoth and the Elephant, as troop transports. The Covenant use even larger vehicles, such as the Harvester, the Kraken and the Draugr.
- In Haze, the main base of operations for the protagonist is a large, mobile terrestrial aircraft carrier.
- In Star Wars, the Jawas use the Sandcrawlers as a mobile base of operations.
- In the Fallout universe, the Enclave faction used a modified crawler-transporter as a mobile base of operations.
- The Dystopian Wars wargame and miniature series is set in an alternate history where steampunk technology has advanced to the point that almost every major nation has access to functional landships.
- In the mobile game Arknights, a landship known as "Rhodes Island" is the main operating base of the protagonists. The size of it is estimated to be two and a half times the size of a Nimitz-class aircraft carrier. The game also features "nomadic cities," which are huge moving platforms with entire cities built on them.
- In Michael Moorcock's Ice Schooner, the Ice Spirit is a fully rigged whaling ship on skis that hunts mutant land whales across the frozen wasteland.
- In Ace Combat 8: Wings of Theve, the Tarpan-class land battleships Xanthos and Balios are heavily armed, technologically advanced amphibious landships developed by the Republic of Sotoa and encountered as enemy boss units in campaign missions.

== See also ==
- Seaship – Seacraft simply known as a ship, large waterborne vessels used for commerce, maritime trade, and naval expeditions.
- Airship – Large aircraft that are the airborne equivalent of naval vessels, mostly used for weather and scientific research purposes.
- Spacecraft – Large vehicles used to transport objects into space, which can be split into expendable rockets or reusable spaceplanes.
- Landship Committee
- Road train
- Armoured train
- Super-heavy tank
- Tsar tank
- List of largest machines
