= Bagman (disambiguation) =

A bagman or bag man is a collector of dirty money for organized crime.

Bagman may also refer to:

- Bagman (video game), a 1982 French platform arcade game
- Bagman, a biochip containing the personality of a fallen comrade in the 2000AD comic Rogue Trooper
- Bagman (film), a 2010 film about Jack Abramoff
- The Amazing/Bombastic Bag-Man, an alias of Peter Parker in the Marvel Comics
- Sack Man or Bag Man, a bogeyman-figure
- Ludo Bagman, a character in J. K. Rowling's Harry Potter series
- The Bag Man, a 2014 film
- Bag Man (podcast), a 2018 podcast about Spiro Agnew's 1973 bribery and corruption scandal
- "Bagman" (Better Call Saul), an episode of the television series Better Call Saul
- Bagman (2024 film)

== See also ==
- Bağban (disambiguation)
- Bag boy (disambiguation)
- Bag lady (disambiguation)
