= Type SRs 8000 bucket-wheel excavator =

Family of Bucket wheel excavators

The Type SRs 8000 or less commonly known as the SRs 8000, is a family of bucket-wheel excavators known for being one of the largest land vehicles in history, with Bagger 293 being the largest of the series. SRs 8000 series bucket-wheel excavators are famously used in the Hambach surface mine.

== Specifications ==
All members of the Type SRs 8000 weigh over 7,000 tons at minimum. The smallest and oldest of the family, Bagger 281 (built in 1958) weighs over 7,800 tons, although the average weight range is around 13,000 tons. Likewise, all members reach lengths of over 200 meters and require a small crew of five. Such a size would mean that these vehicles would have its own on-board toiletry and kitchenette rooms.

As BWEs, the Type SRs 8000s are all externally powered by a nearby coal production plant with an internal 6,413 kW (8,600 hp) powered electric motor to keep the machine operating smoothly. On average, all Baggers require a total output 16.56 MW (22,207 hp) of power to function with all-systems running. Their primary goal as BWEs, is in excavating lignite coal in Germany for processing to be turned into energy or 240,000 cubic metres of overburden daily.

Currently, all Type SRs 8000s are in-service. They are Bagger 281 (1958), Bagger 285 (1975), Bagger 287 (1976), Bagger 288 (1978), Bagger 291 (1993) and Bagger 293 (1995).

== Gallery ==
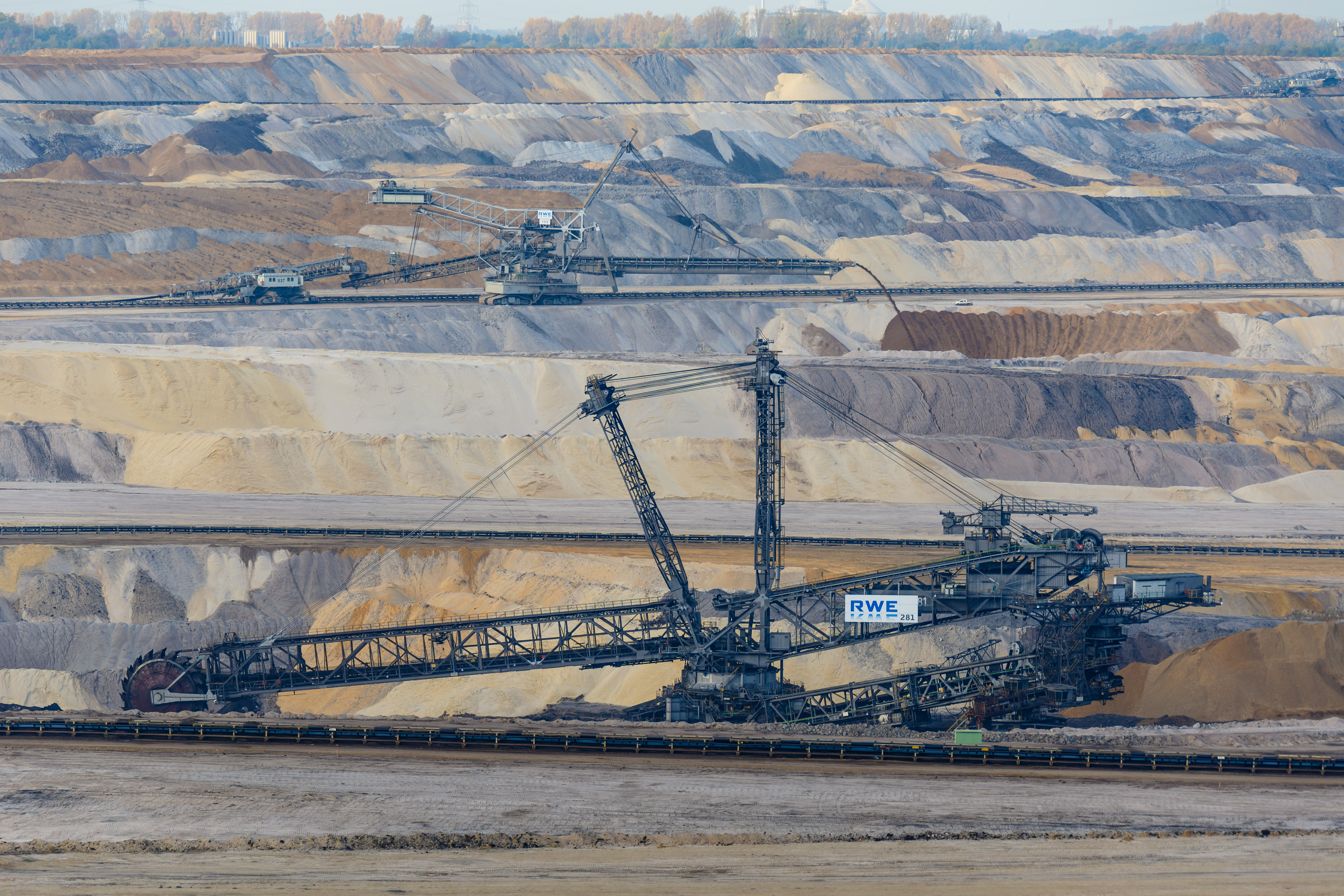
Bagger 281

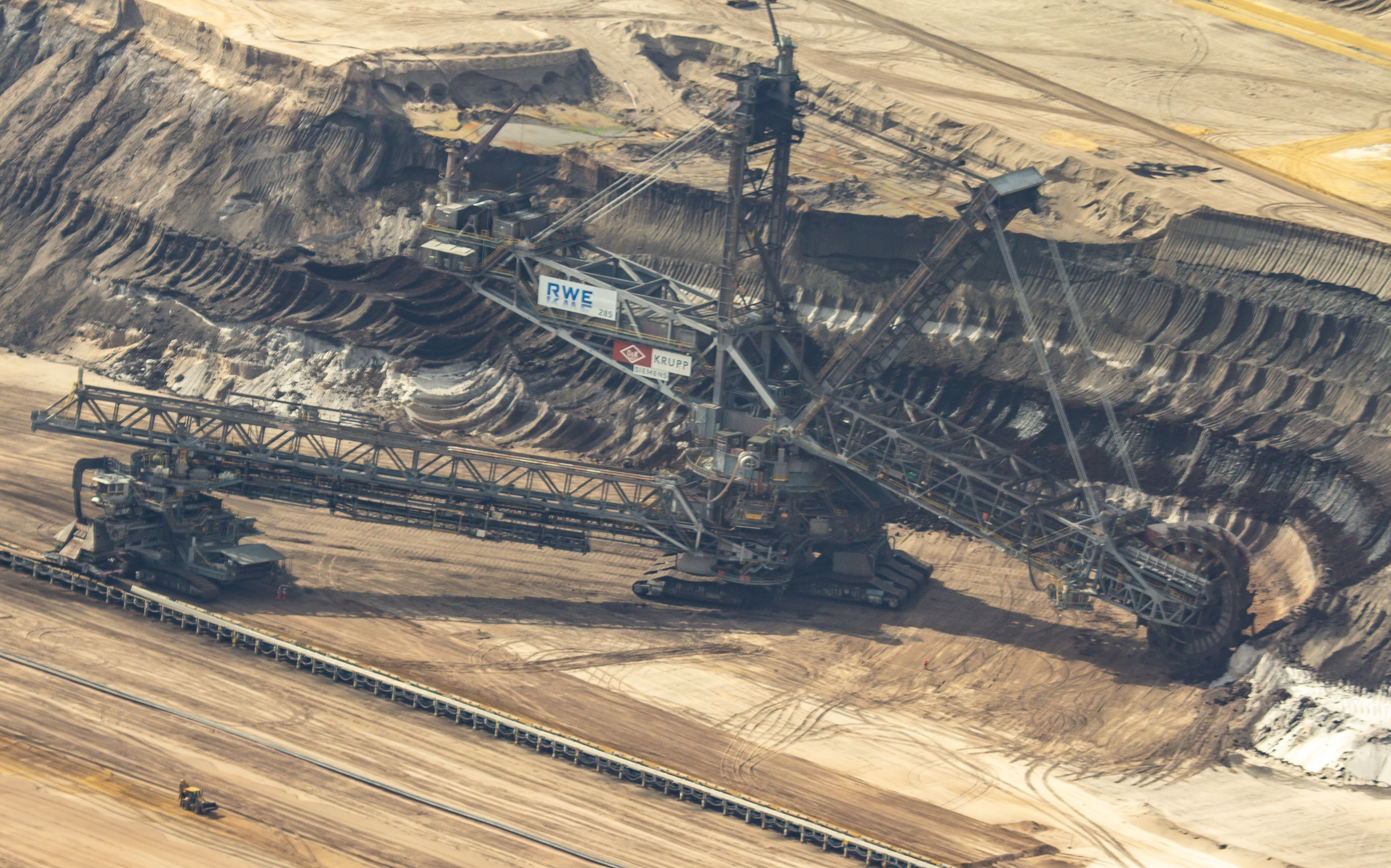
Bagger 285

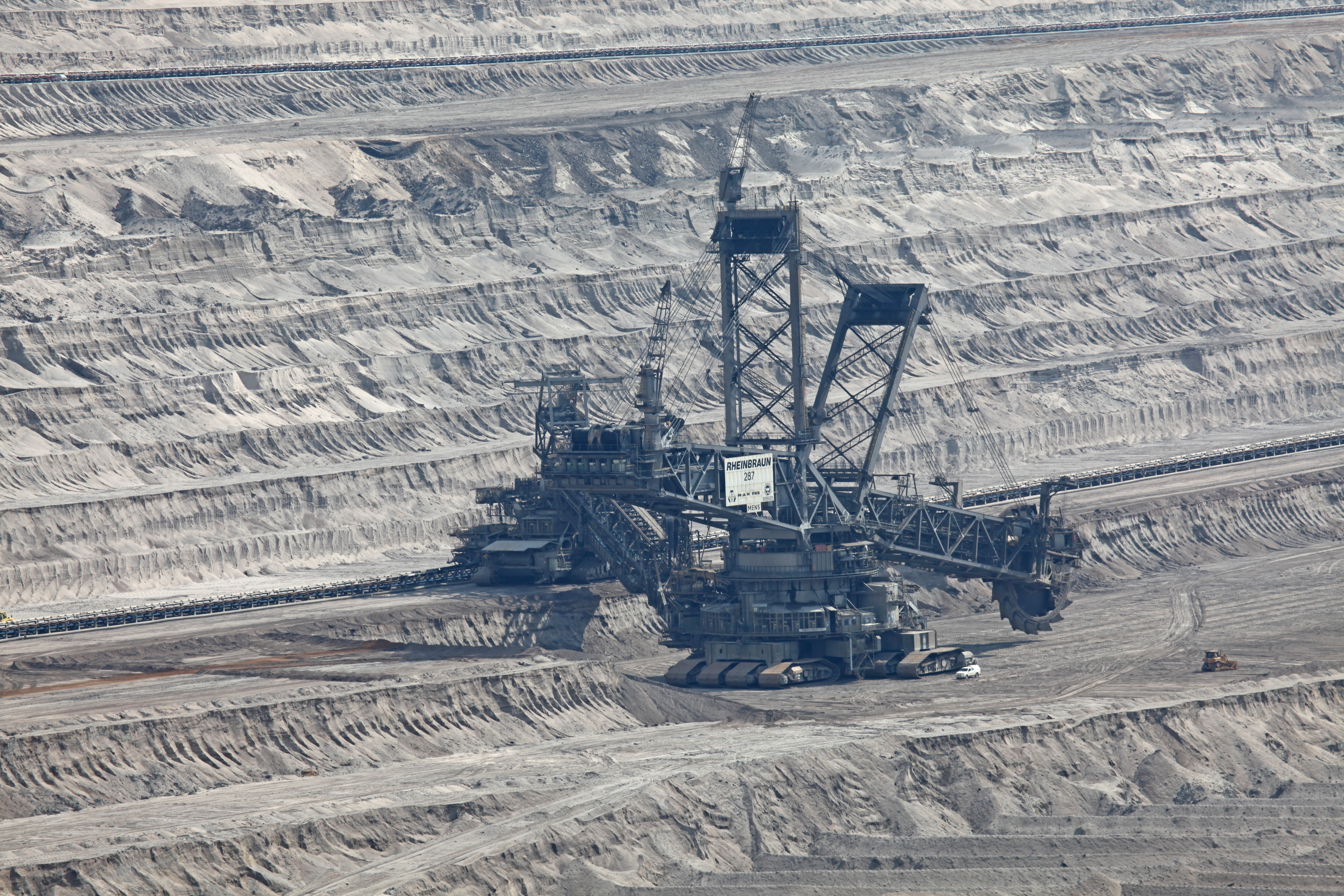
Bagger 287

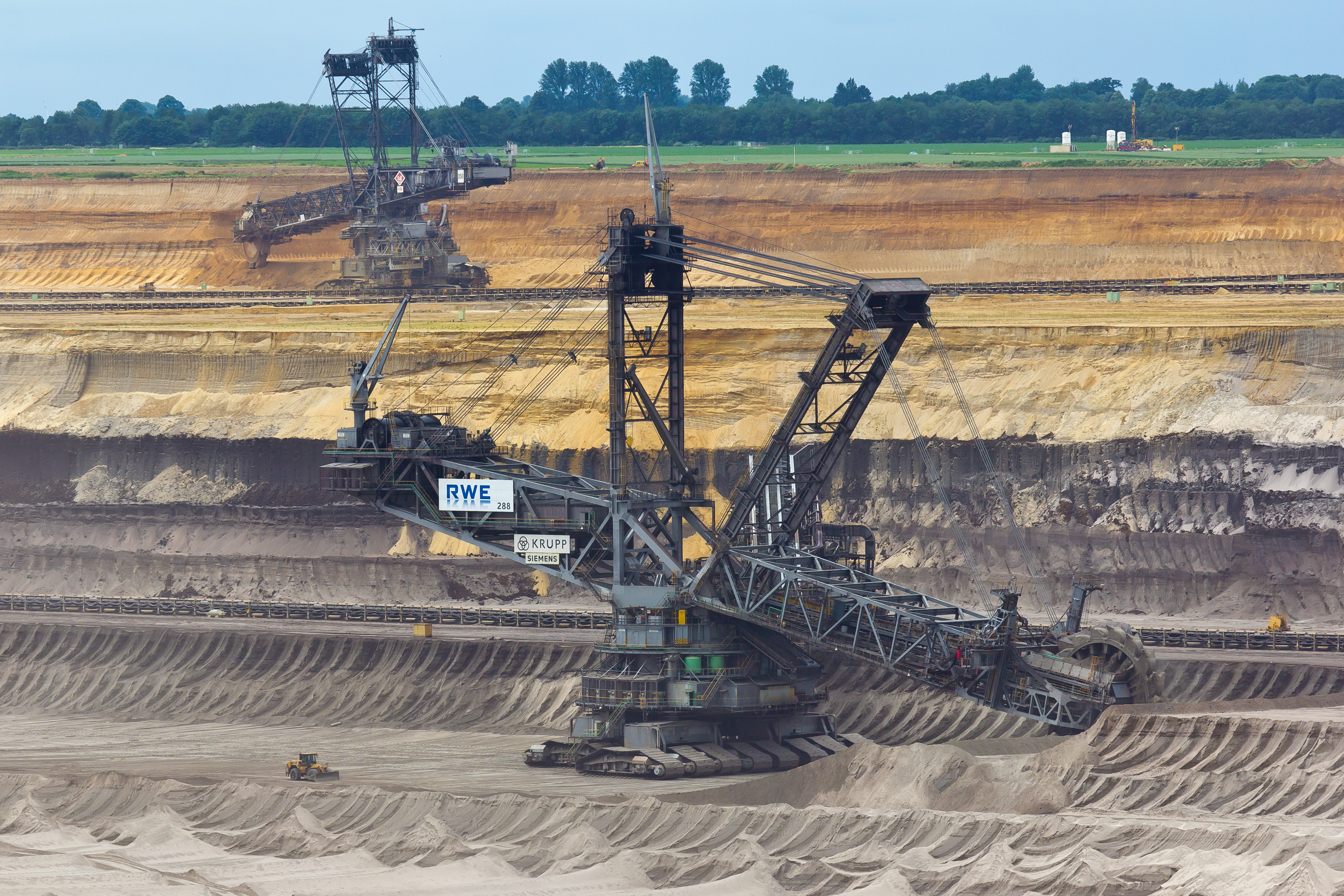
Bagger 288

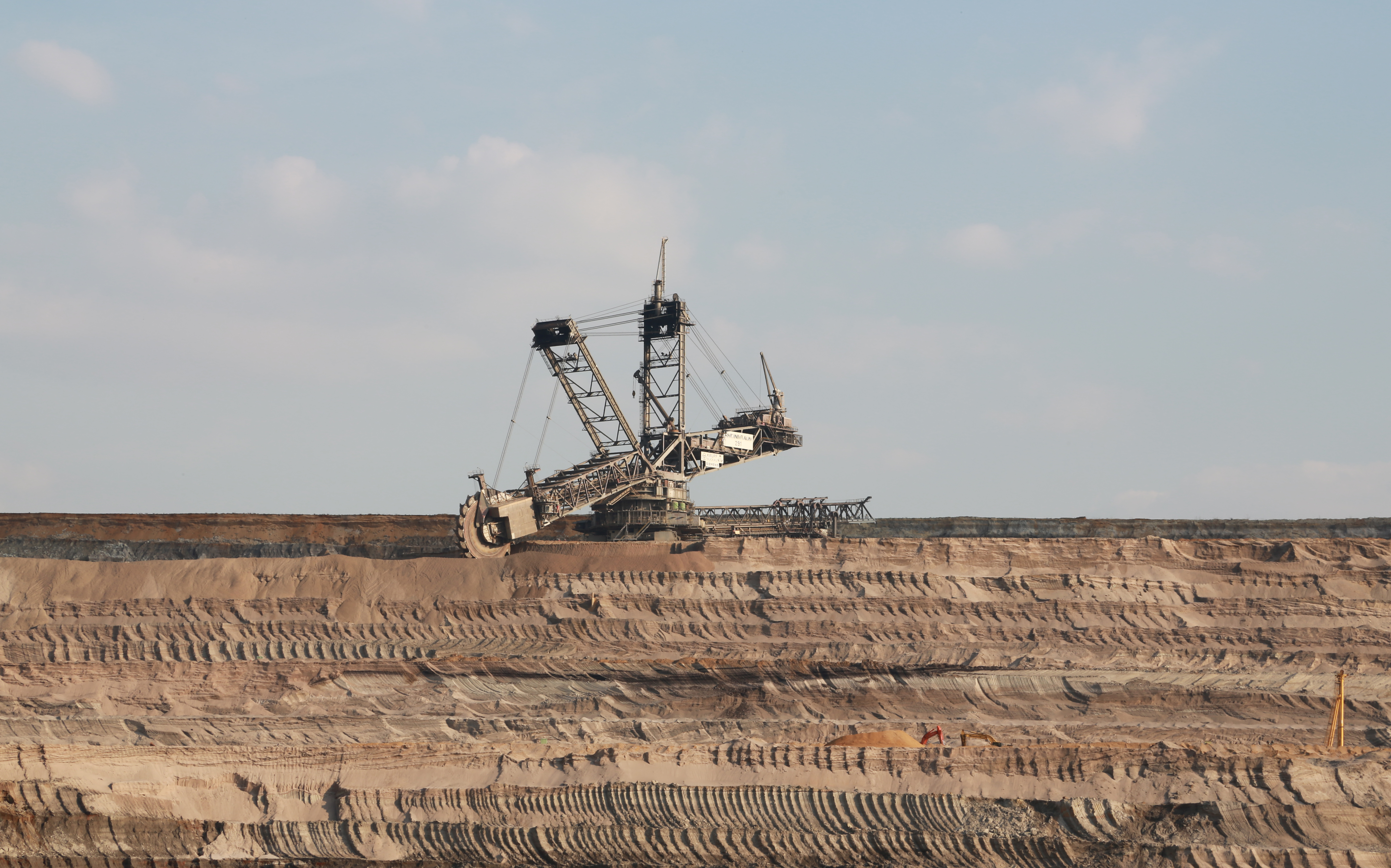
Bagger 291

== See also ==
- List of largest machines
- Bucket-wheel excavators
- Landships
- Bagger 288
- Bagger 293
