= Bagger (disambiguation) =

A bagger is a supermarket clerk who puts purchases into a bag.

Bagger may also refer to:

- Bagger, a touring motorcycle equipped with saddlebags
- Bagger Wood, a woodland in South Yorkshire, England
- Bagger (surname), a list of people
- The title character of the 2000 film The Legend of Bagger Vance

== See also ==
- Bagger 288 and Bagger 293, bucket-wheel excavators
