= Bağban =

Bağban or Bagman may refer to:

- Bağban, Kurdamir, Azerbaijan
- Bağban, Ujar, Azerbaijan
