= Bag boy (disambiguation) =

A bag boy is a nickname for a bagger.

Bag boy and bagboy may also refer to:

- "Bagboy" (song), a July 2013 single by the Pixies from the 2014 EP EP3 and the 2014 album Indie Cindy
- Bagboy (TV special), a 2015 television special
- National Lampoon's Bag Boy, a 2007 comedy film

== See also ==
- Sackboy, a character in the LittleBigPlanet video game series.
- Bagger (disambiguation)
- Bagman (disambiguation)
