= List of largest passenger vehicles =

The size of RMS Titanic compared with a human, car, bus, and an Airbus A380.

The following is a list of the largest passenger vehicles with consumer availability in history.

== Overall ==
RMS Queen Mary 2 and RMS Titanic

A size comparison chart of MS Silja Europa and Oasis of the Seas, based on the silhouettes of the ships

Model	Type	Length	Passengers	Year introduced	Year discontinued
Icon of the Seas	Cruise ship	364.75 m (1,196.7 ft)	5610 double occupancy, 7600 max.	2023	
Wonder of the Seas	Cruise ship	362.1 m (1,188 ft 0 in)	5734 double occupancy, 6988 max.	2022	
RMS Queen Mary 2	Ocean liner	345 m (1,131 ft 11 in)	2620	2003	
MS Freedom of the Seas	Cruise ship	338.77 m (1,111 ft 5 in)	4515	2006	

== Aircraft ==
Model	Type	Length	Passengers	Year introduced	Year discontinued
LZ 129 Hindenburg	Airship	244.96 m (803 ft 8 in)	70	1936	1937

=== Heavier-than air ===
Model	Type	Length	Passengers	Year introduced	Year discontinued
Airbus A380	Wide-body aircraft	72.72 m (238 ft 7 in)	853	2007	2021

== Rail ==
=== Unit (carriage) ===
Model	Type	Length	Passengers	Year introduced
Bombardier MultiLevel Coach	Bilevel rail car	25.91 m (85.01 ft)	142	2002
Bombardier BiLevel Coach	Bilevel rail car		276	
Bombardier Double-deck Coach	Bilevel rail car		150	

== See also ==
- Transport
- History of transport
- Road train#World's longest road trains for road freight
- Dragon Park Ha Long largest aerial lift
- List of largest machines
