= List of largest machines =

This is a list of the world's largest machines, both static and movable in history.

== Building structure ==
- Large Hadron Collider – The world's largest single machine

== Ground vehicles ==
=== Mining vehicles ===
Model	Type	Length	Height	Width	Weight	Year introduced	Year discontinued
Bagger 293	Bucket-wheel excavator	225 m (738 ft 2 in)	96 m (315 ft 0 in)	46 m (150 ft 11 in)	14,200 t (31,300,000 lb)	1995	N/A
Overburden Conveyor Bridge F60	Conveyor bridge	502 m (1,647 ft 0 in)	79 m (259 ft 2 in)	241 m (790 ft 8 in)	13,600 t (30,000,000 lb)	1969	N/A
Bagger 288	Bucket-wheel excavator	220 m (721 ft 9 in)	96 m (315 ft 0 in)	46 m (150 ft 11 in)	13,500 t (29,800,000 lb)	1978	N/A
The Captain	Giant stripping shovel	97 m (318 ft 3 in)	64 m (210 ft 0 in)	27 m (88 ft 7 in)	12,700 t (28,000,000 lb)	1965	1991
Big Muskie	Dragline excavator	148 m (485 ft 7 in)	68 m (223 ft 1 in)	46 m (150 ft 11 in)	12,247 t (27,000,000 lb)	1969	1991

=== Engineering and transport vehicles ===
Model	Type	Length	Height	Width	Weight	Year introduced	Year discontinued
Honghai Crane	Mobile gantry crane		150 m (492 ft 2 in)	124 m (406 ft 10 in)	11,000 t (24,300,000 lb)	2014	
Big Bertha	Tunnel boring machine	99 m (324 ft 10 in)	17.5 m (57 ft 5 in)	17.5 m (57 ft 5 in)	6,100 t (13,400,000 lb)	2012	2017
XGC88000 crawler crane	Crawler crane	173 m (567 ft 7 in)	108 m (354 ft 4 in)		5,350 t (11,800,000 lb)	2013	
NASA Crawler-transporter	Crawler-transporter	40 m (131 ft 3 in)	6–8 m (19 ft 8 in – 26 ft 3 in)	35 m (114 ft 10 in)	2,721 t (6,000,000 lb)	1965	

=== Military vehicles ===
Model	Type	Length	Height	Width	Weight	Year introduced	Year discontinued
Schwerer Gustav	Railway gun	47.3 m (155 ft 2 in)	11.6 m (38 ft 1 in)	7.1 m (23 ft 4 in)	1,350 t (2,980,000 lb)	1941	1945
Helepolis	Siege tower	20 m (65 ft 7 in)	40 m (131 ft 3 in)	20 m (65 ft 7 in)	160 t (353,000 lb)	305 BCE	292 BCE

== Air vehicles ==
=== Lighter-than-air vehicles ===
Model	Type	Length	Diameter	Weight	Year introduced	Year discontinued
LZ 129 Hindenburg	Rigid airship	245 m (803 ft 10 in)	41.2 m (135 ft 2 in)	215 t (474,000 lb)	1936	1937
USS Akron	Rigid airship	239 m (784 ft 1 in)	40 m (131 ft 3 in)	182.8 t (403,000 lb)	1931	1933
R101	Rigid airship	236.8 m (776 ft 11 in)	40 m (131 ft 3 in)	116.9 t (258,000 lb)	1929	1930
Hybrid Air Vehicles Airlander 10	Hybrid airship	92 m (301 ft 10 in)	34 m (111 ft 7 in)	33.2 t (73,200 lb)	2012	

=== Heavier-than-air vehicles ===
Model	Type	Length	Wingspan	Weight	Year introduced	Year discontinued
Antonov An-225 Mriya	Cargo aircraft	84 m (275 ft 7 in)	88.4 m (290 ft 0 in)	285 t (628,000 lb)	1988	2022
Scaled Composites Stratolaunch	Mother ship	73 m (239 ft 6 in)	117 m (383 ft 10 in)	226 t (498,000 lb)	2019	
Caspian Sea Monster	Ekranoplan	92 m (301 ft 10 in)	37.6 m (123 ft 4 in)	240 t (529,000 lb)	1964	1980
Airbus A380	Wide-body airliner	72.7 m (238 ft 6 in)	79.7 m (261 ft 6 in)	285 t (628,000 lb)	2003	2021
Boeing 747-8	Wide-body airliner	76.3 m (250 ft 4 in)	68.5 m (224 ft 9 in)	220.1 t (485,000 lb)	2008	2023
Hughes H-4 Hercules	Flying boat	66.7 m (218 ft 10 in)	97.8 m (320 ft 10 in)	113 t (249,000 lb)	1947	1947

== Sea vehicles ==
=== Industrial and cargo vessels ===
Model	Type	Length	Height/Depth	Width/Beam	Gross Weight Tonnage	Year introduced	Year discontinued
Prelude FLNG	Floating production storage and offloading	488 m (1,601 ft 1 in)	105 m (344 ft 6 in)	74 m (242 ft 9 in)	300,000 t (661,000,000 lb)	2013	
Seawise Giant	Oil tanker	458.4 m (1,503 ft 11 in)	29.8 m (97 ft 9 in)	68.6 m (225 ft 1 in)	260,941 t (575,000,000 lb)	1979	2009
Pioneering Spirit	Crane vessel	382 m (1,253 ft 3 in)	30 m (98 ft 5 in)	124 m (406 ft 10 in)	403,342 t (889,000,000 lb)	2013	
Batillus	Supertanker	414.22 m (1,359 ft 0 in)	35.92 m (117 ft 10 in)	63.01 m (206 ft 9 in)	275,268 t (607,000,000 lb)	1976	2003
TI	Supertanker	380 m (1,246 ft 9 in)		68 m (223 ft 1 in)	234,006 t (516,000,000 lb)	2003	

=== Passenger vessels ===
Model	Type	Length	Height/Depth	Width/Beam	Gross Weight Tonnage	Year introduced	Year discontinued
Icon of the Seas	Cruise ship	364.75 m (1,196 ft 8 in)	59.74 m (196 ft 0 in)	48.47 m (159 ft 0 in)	248,663 t (548,000,000 lb)	2022	
Wonder of the Seas	Cruise ship	362.04 m (1,187 ft 10 in)		64 m (210 ft 0 in)	236,857 t (522,000,000 lb)	2020	
Symphony of the Seas	Cruise ship	361.011 m (1,184 ft 5.0 in)	72.5 m (237 ft 10 in)	66 m (216 ft 6 in)	228,081 t (503,000,000 lb)	2018	
Queen Mary 2	Ocean liner	345.03 m (1,132 ft 0 in)	72 m (236 ft 3 in)	45 m (147 ft 8 in)	149,215 t (329,000,000 lb)	2004	

=== Military vessels ===
Model	Type	Length	Height/Depth	Width/Beam	Gross Weight Tonnage	Year introduced	Year discontinued
Gerald R. Ford	Nuclear-powered supercarrier	337 m (1,105 ft 8 in)	76 m (249 ft 4 in)	78 m (255 ft 11 in)	110,000 t (243,000,000 lb)	2017	
Nimitz	Nuclear-powered supercarrier	332.8 m (1,091 ft 10 in)	76 m (249 ft 4 in)	76.8 m (252 ft 0 in)	106,300 t (234,000,000 lb)	1975	
Fujian	Conventional-powered supercarrier	316 m (1,036 ft 9 in)		76 m (249 ft 4 in)	80,000–100,000 t (176,000,000–220,000,000 lb)	2022	

== Space vehicles ==
=== Space stations ===
Model	Type	Length	Width	Weight	Year introduced	Year discontinued
International Space Station	Space station	73 m (239 ft 6 in)	109 m (357 ft 7 in)	444.6 t (980,000 lb)	1998	
Tiangong Space Station	Space station	55.6 m (182 ft 5 in)	9.25 m (30 ft 4 in)	100 t (220,000 lb)	2021	

=== Launch vehicles ===
Model	Type	Length	Diameter	Weight	Year introduced	Year discontinued
SpaceX Starship	Super heavy-lift launch vehicle	120 m (393 ft 8 in)	9 m (29 ft 6 in)	5,000 t (11,000,000 lb)	2023	
Saturn V	Super heavy-lift launch vehicle	110.6 m (362 ft 10 in)	10.1 m (33 ft 2 in)	2,965 t (6,540,000 lb)	1967	1973
N1	Super heavy-lift launch vehicle	105.3 m (345 ft 6 in)	17 m (55 ft 9 in)	2,750 t (6,060,000 lb)	1969	1972
SLS Block 1	Super heavy-lift launch vehicle	98 m (321 ft 6 in)	8.4 m (27 ft 7 in)	2,610 t (5,750,000 lb)	2022	
Energia	Super heavy-lift launch vehicle	58.7 m (192 ft 7 in)	17.6 m (57 ft 9 in)	2,525 t (5,570,000 lb)	1987	1988

== See also ==
- List of largest passenger vehicles
- List of large aircraft
