= Crawler-transporter =

NASA rocket transport vehicle

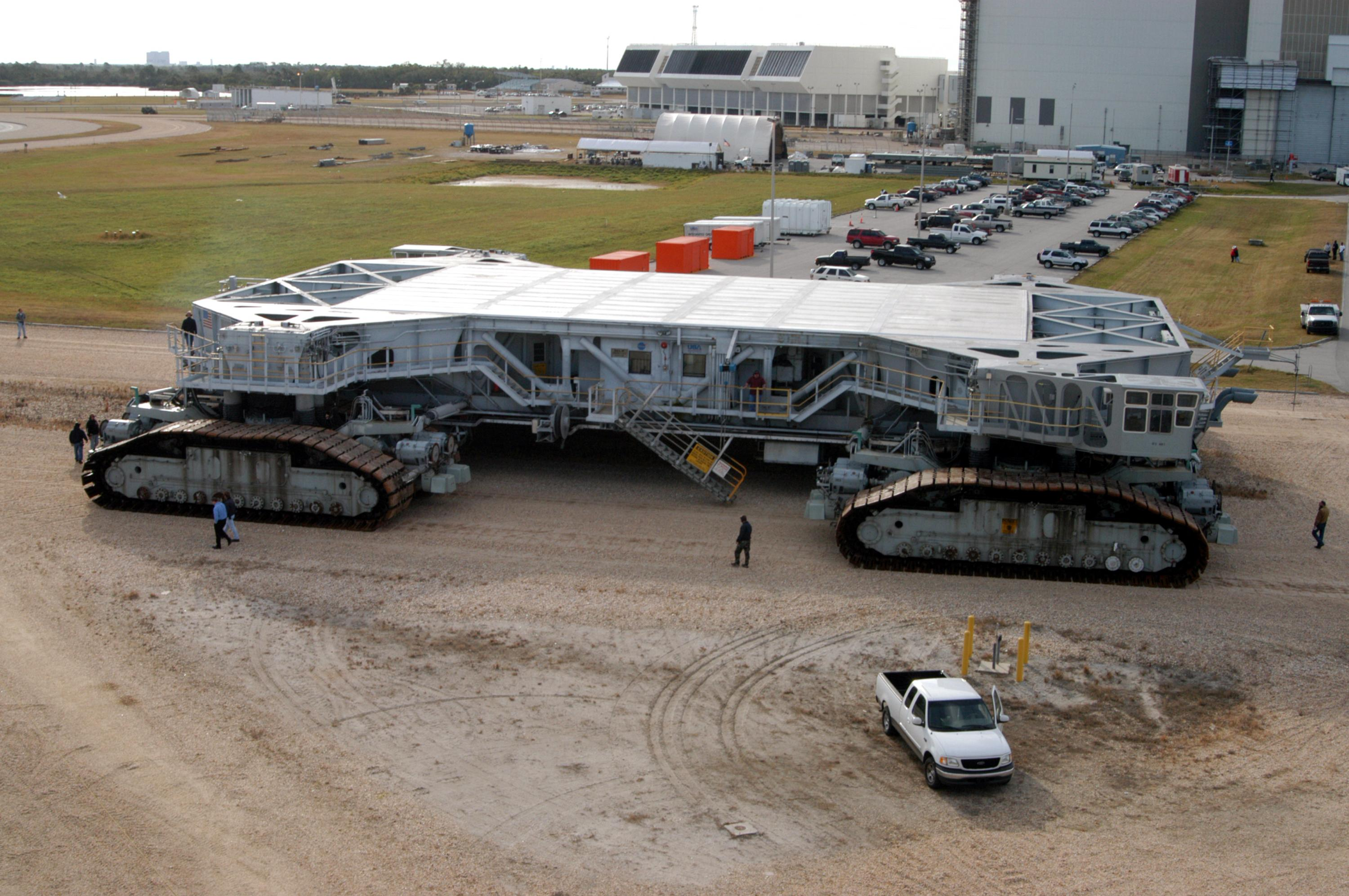

Overview
- Manufacturer: Marion Power Shovel Company
- Also called: Missile Crawler Transporter Facilities
- Model years: 1965

Powertrain
- Engine: 2 × 2,050 kW (2,750 hp) V16 ALCO 251C diesel engines, driving 4 × 1,000 kW (1,341 hp) generators for traction; 2 × 794 kW (1,065 hp) engines driving 2 × 750 kW (1,006 hp) generators powering auxiliaries: jacking, steering, lighting, and ventilating.
- Transmission: 16 × traction motors, 4 per corner

Dimensions
- Length: 40 m (131 ft)
- Width: 35 m (114 ft)
- Height: Adjustable, 6 to 8 m (20 to 26 ft)
- Curb weight: 2,721 t (6,000,000 lb)
- Missile Crawler Transporter Facilities
- U.S. National Register of Historic Places
- Location: Kennedy Space Center, Florida
- MPS: John F. Kennedy Space Center MPS
- NRHP reference No.: 99001643
- Added to NRHP: January 21, 2000

The crawler-transporters, formally known as the Missile Crawler Transporter Facilities, are a pair of tracked vehicles used to transport launch vehicles from NASA's Vehicle Assembly Building (VAB) along the Crawlerway to Launch Complex 39. They were originally used to transport the Saturn IB and Saturn V rockets during the Apollo, Skylab and Apollo–Soyuz programs. They were then used to transport Space Shuttles from 1981 to 2011. The crawler-transporters carry vehicles on the mobile launcher platforms (MLPs) used by NASA, and after each launch return to the pad to take the platform back to the VAB.

The two crawler-transporters were designed and built by Marion Power Shovel Company using some components designed and built by Rockwell International at a cost of US$14 million (equivalent to $143 million in 2025) each. Upon its construction, the crawler-transporter became the largest self-powered land vehicle in the world. While other vehicles such as bucket-wheel excavators like Bagger 288, dragline excavators like Big Muskie and power shovels like The Captain are significantly larger, they are powered by external sources.

The two crawler-transporters were added to the National Register of Historic Places on January 21, 2000.

== Specifications ==
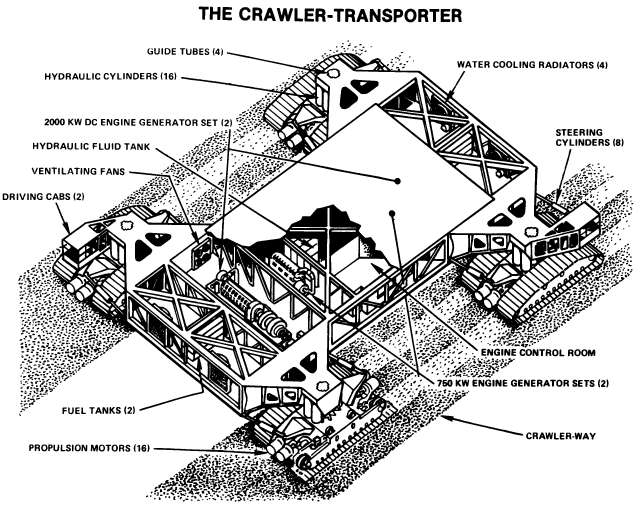
Diagram of a crawler-transporter

The crawler-transporter has a mass of 2,721 tonnes (6 million pounds; 2,999 short tons) and has eight tracks, two on each corner. Each track has 57 shoes, and each shoe weighs 998 kg (2,200 lb). The vehicle measures 40 by 35 meters (131 by 114 ft). The height from ground level to the platform is adjustable from 6.1 to 7.9 m (20 to 26 ft), and each side can be raised and lowered independently of the other. The crawler uses a laser guidance system and a leveling system to keep the Mobile Launcher Platform level within 10 minutes of arc (0.16 degrees; about 30 cm (1 ft) at the top of the Saturn V), while moving up the 5 percent grade to the launch site. A separate laser docking system provides pinpoint accuracy when the crawler-transporter and Mobile Launch Platform are positioned in the VAB or at the launch pad. A team of nearly 30 engineers, technicians and drivers operate the vehicle, centered on an internal control room, and the crawler is driven from two control cabs located at either end. Before the launch the crawler-transporter is removed.

The crawlers were overhauled in 2003 with upgrades to the Motor Control Center, which houses the switchgear and electrical controls of all of major systems on board; a new engine and pump ventilation system; new diesel engine radiators; and replacement of the two driver cabs on each vehicle (one on each end). After the 2003 refit, each crawler had 16 traction motors, powered by four 1,000 kW (1,341 hp) generators, in turn driven by two 2,050 kW (2,750 hp) V16 ALCO 251C diesel engines. Two 750 kW (1,006 hp) generators, driven by two 794 kW (1,065 hp) engines, were used for jacking, steering, lighting, and ventilating. Two 150 kW (201 hp) generators were also available to power the Mobile Launcher Platform. The crawler's tanks held 19,000 liters (5,000 U.S. gal) of diesel fuel, and it burned 296 liters per kilometer (125.7 U.S. gal/mi).

Due to their age and the need to support the heavier Space Launch System and its launch tower, in 2012–2014 the crawlers were undergoing an upgrade involving "new engines, new exhausts, new brakes, new hydraulics, new computers"; CT-2 was further upgraded in 2014–2016 to increase its lifting capacity from 5,400 to 8,200 tonnes (12 to 18 million pounds).

The crawlers traveled along the 5.5 and 6.8 km (3.4 and 4.2 mi) Crawlerways, to LC-39A and LC-39B, respectively, at a maximum speed of 1.6 kilometers per hour (1 mph) loaded, or 3.2 km/h (2 mph) unloaded. The average trip time from the VAB along the Crawlerway to Launch Complex 39 is about five hours. Each Crawlerway is 2 m (7 ft) deep and covered with Alabama and Tennessee river rock for its low friction properties to reduce the possibility of sparks. In 2000, NASA unearthed and restored an Apollo-era segment of the Crawlerway to provide access to High Bay 2 in the VAB in order to provide protection from a hurricane for up to three Shuttles at the same time.

Kennedy Space Center has been using the same two crawlers since their initial delivery in 1965. They are now nicknamed "Hans and Franz", after the parodic Austrian bodybuilder characters on Saturday Night Live, played by Dana Carvey and Kevin Nealon. In their lifetime, they have traveled more than 5,500 km (3,400 mi), about the same driving distance as from Miami to Seattle.

== Future use ==
=== Crawler-Transporter 2 ===
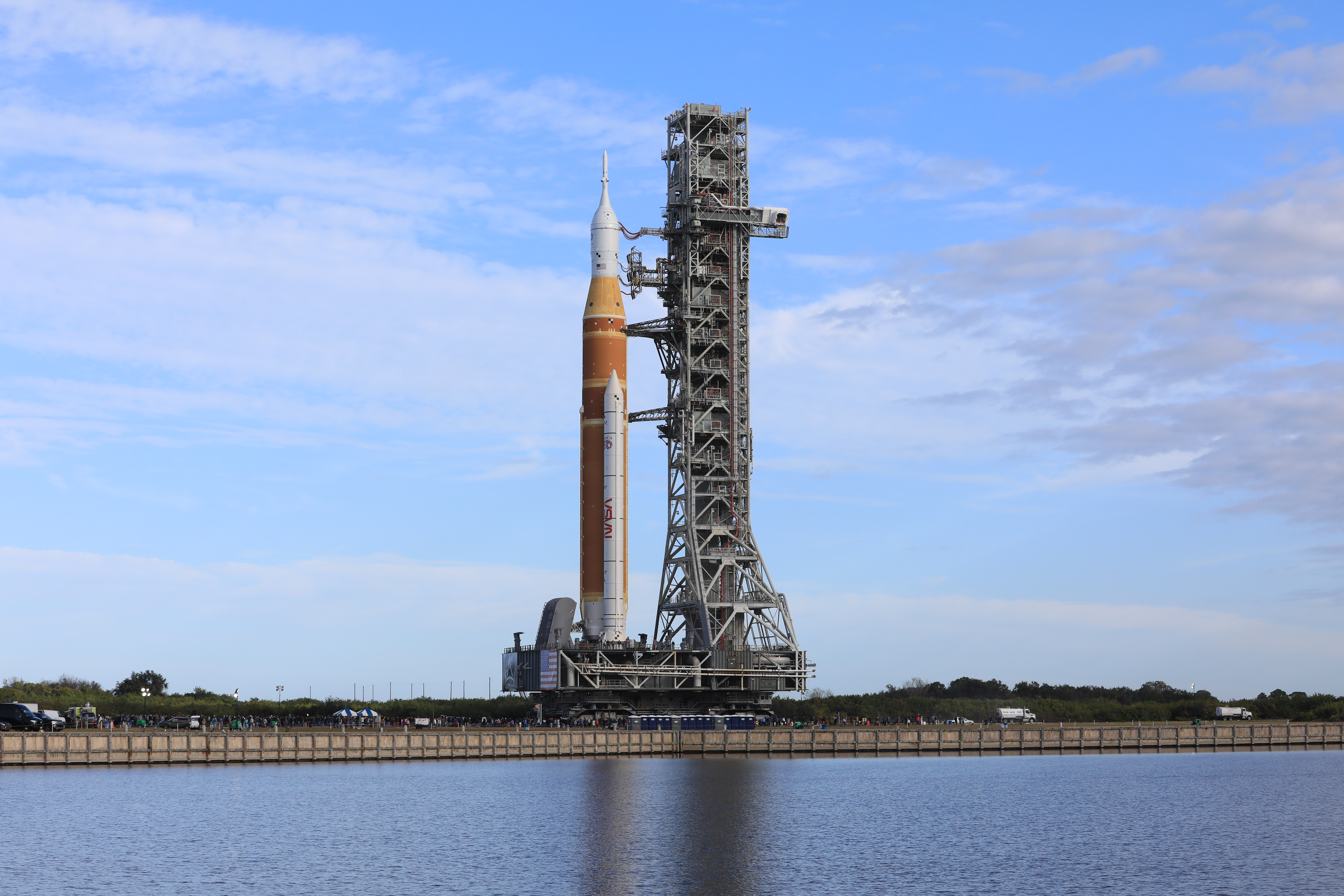
Crawler-Transporter 2 transporting the Artemis II stack to Launch Complex 39B in January 2026

NASA currently uses crawler-transporter 2 to transport the Space Launch System with the Orion spacecraft atop it from the Vehicle Assembly Building to Launch Pad 39B for the Artemis missions. Early in 2016, NASA finished upgrading crawler-transporter 2 (CT-2) to a "Super Crawler" for use in the Artemis program. NASA performed a rollout of the Artemis 1 Space Launch System and Orion on March 17, 2022, for the first Wet Dress Rehearsal, and the rollout for launch, which launched in November 2022. The rollout for the WDR, marked the first time one of the crawler transporters rolled a launch vehicle to the launch pad since STS-135.

=== Crawler-Transporter 1 ===
NASA had originally planned for crawler-transporter 1 to be used by commercial launch vehicles. In April 2016, then Orbital ATK, now Northrop Grumman Innovation Systems, and NASA entered negotiations for the lease of CT-1 and one of the four Vehicle Assembly Building bays. Northrop Grumman planned to use CT-1 to transport their Omega from the Vehicle Assembly Building to Launch Pad 39B. Omega was cancelled in September 2020 after Northrop Grumman lost the National Security Space Launch contract to United Launch Alliance and SpaceX.

== Appearances in popular culture ==
The crawler-transporters have featured in television and movies. In a 2007 season three episode of Dirty Jobs, host Mike Rowe helps workers maintain a crawler-transporter and takes the vehicle for a short drive. The crawler was also seen in the 1995 film Apollo 13, the 2011 film Transformers: Dark of the Moon and the 2019 film Apollo 11. Similar vehicles also appeared in the 2013 film Pacific Rim.

In the 2009 Fallout 3 video game add-on pack "Broken Steel", the Enclave — the US government's remnants — have a mobile base built on and into a heavily modified crawler. In Sid Meier's Alpha Centauri, various units are called "crawlers" and feature chassis based on the crawler-transporters. In Asphalt 8: Airborne, three crawler-transporters drive over the space center French Guiana track, despite the fact the actual space center of French Guiana doesn't use similar vehicles

== Gallery ==
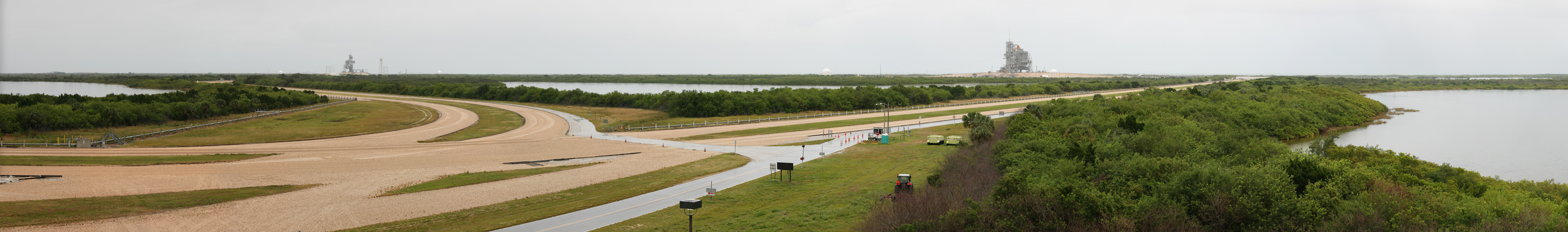
Crawlerway junction at the LC-39 observation gantry. The right track leads to pad LC-39A (pictured with Space Shuttle Endeavour), while the left track leads to pad LC-39B.
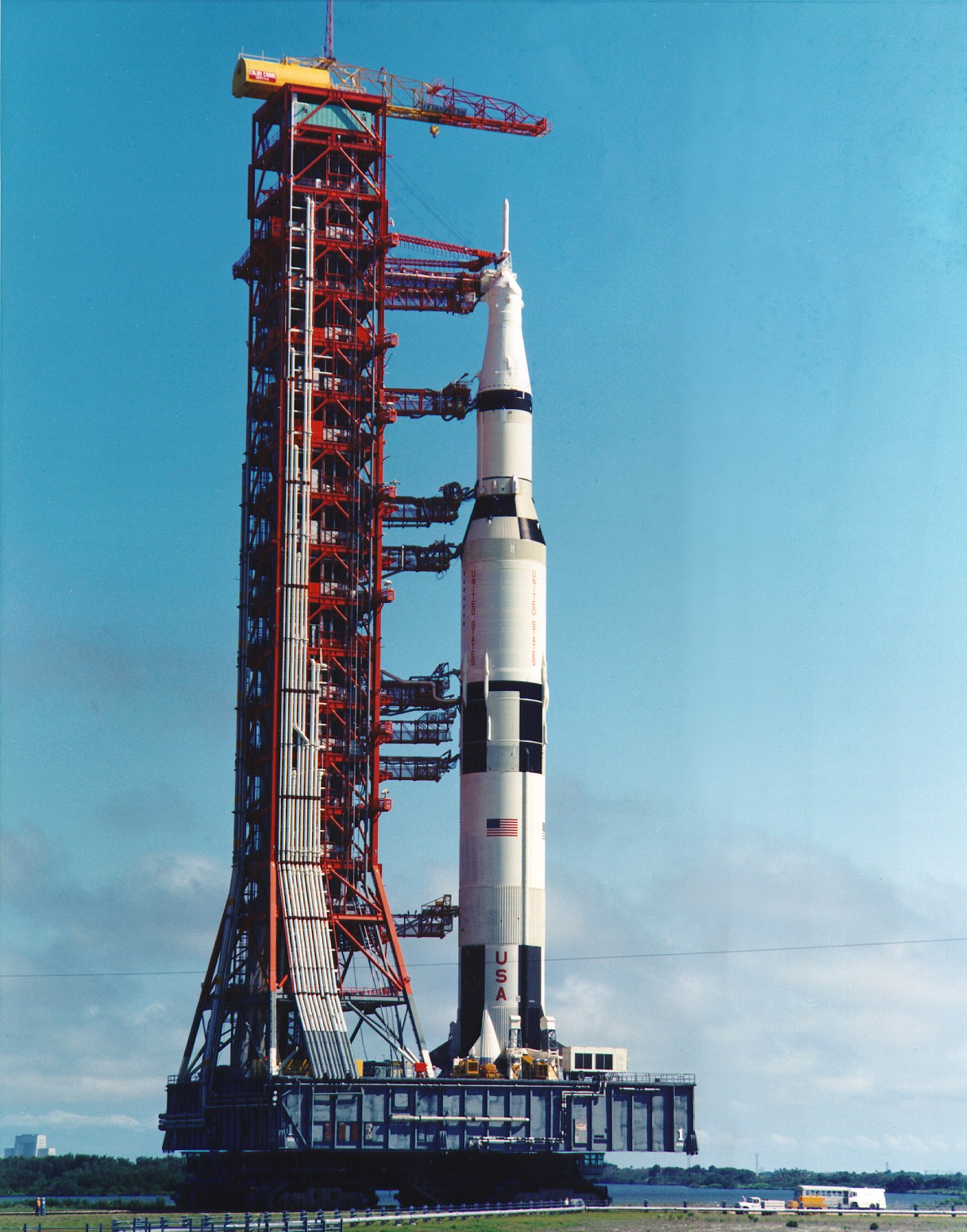
Saturn V, service structure and MLP on top of a crawler

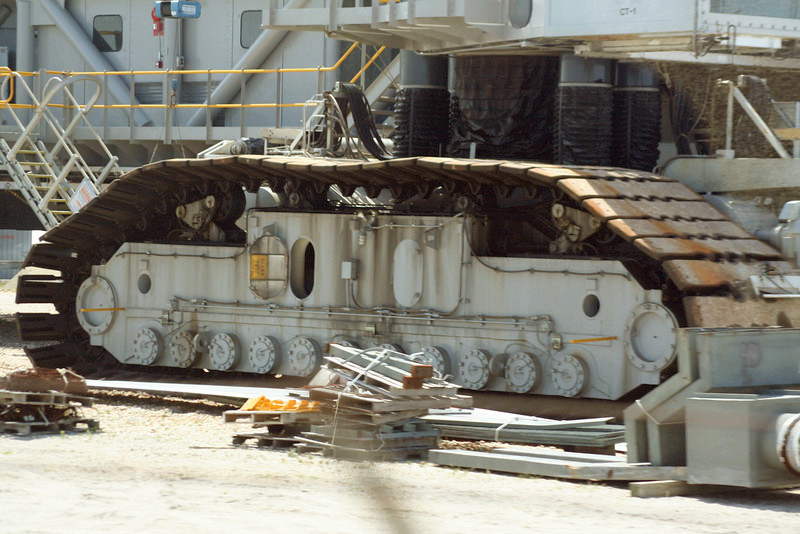
Detail of crawler treads

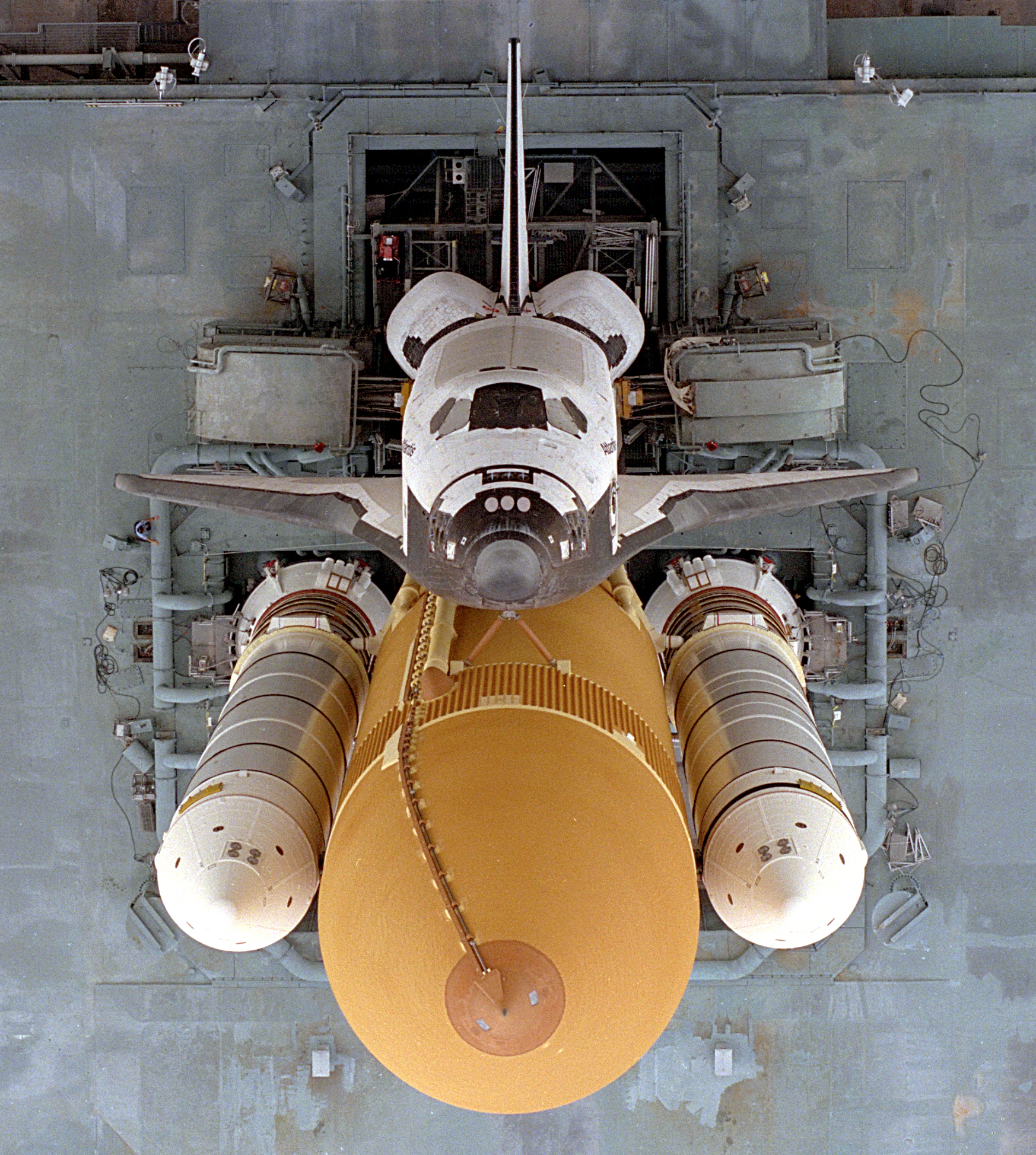
Space Shuttle Atlantis (STS-79) atop an MLP (and crawler beneath)

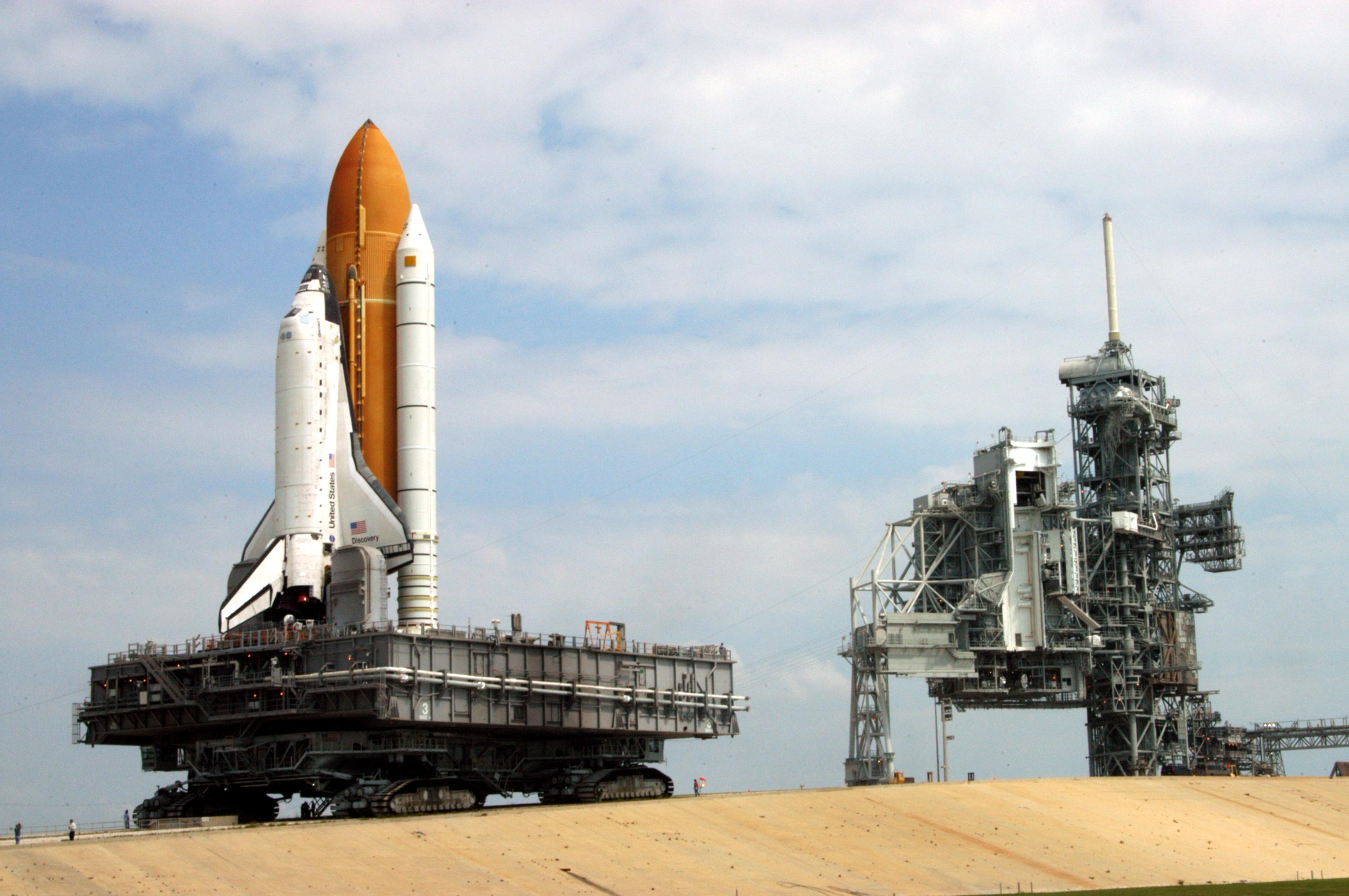
A crawler-transporter carrying Discovery (STS-114) travels the ramp to Launch Pad 39B. The vehicle's back end can be raised, keeping the Shuttle and the MLP level.

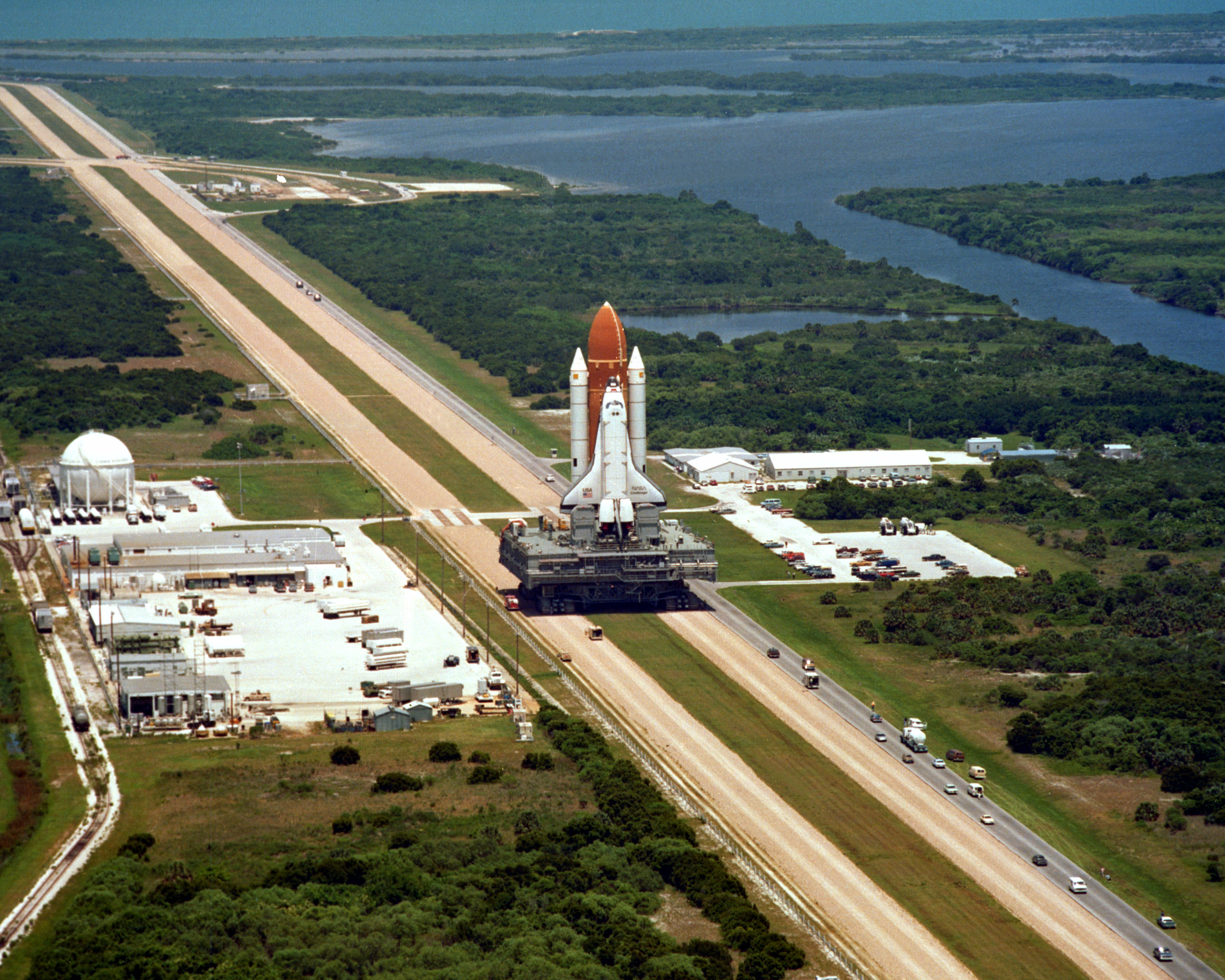
Space Shuttle Challenger atop an MLP atop a crawler, in transit to its launch pad prior to its final flight (STS-51-L), January 28, 1986

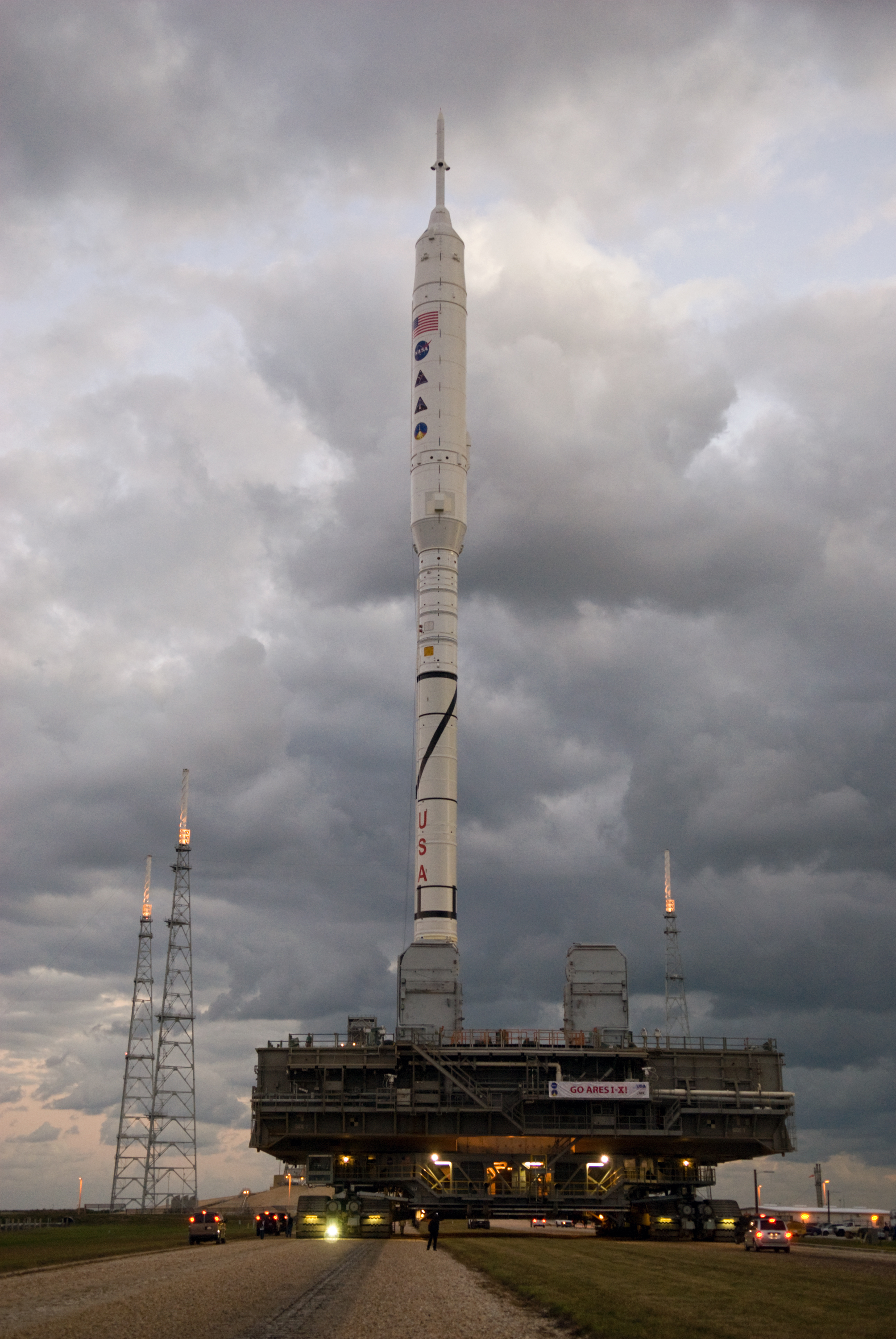
Crawler carrying the Ares I-X atop an MLP

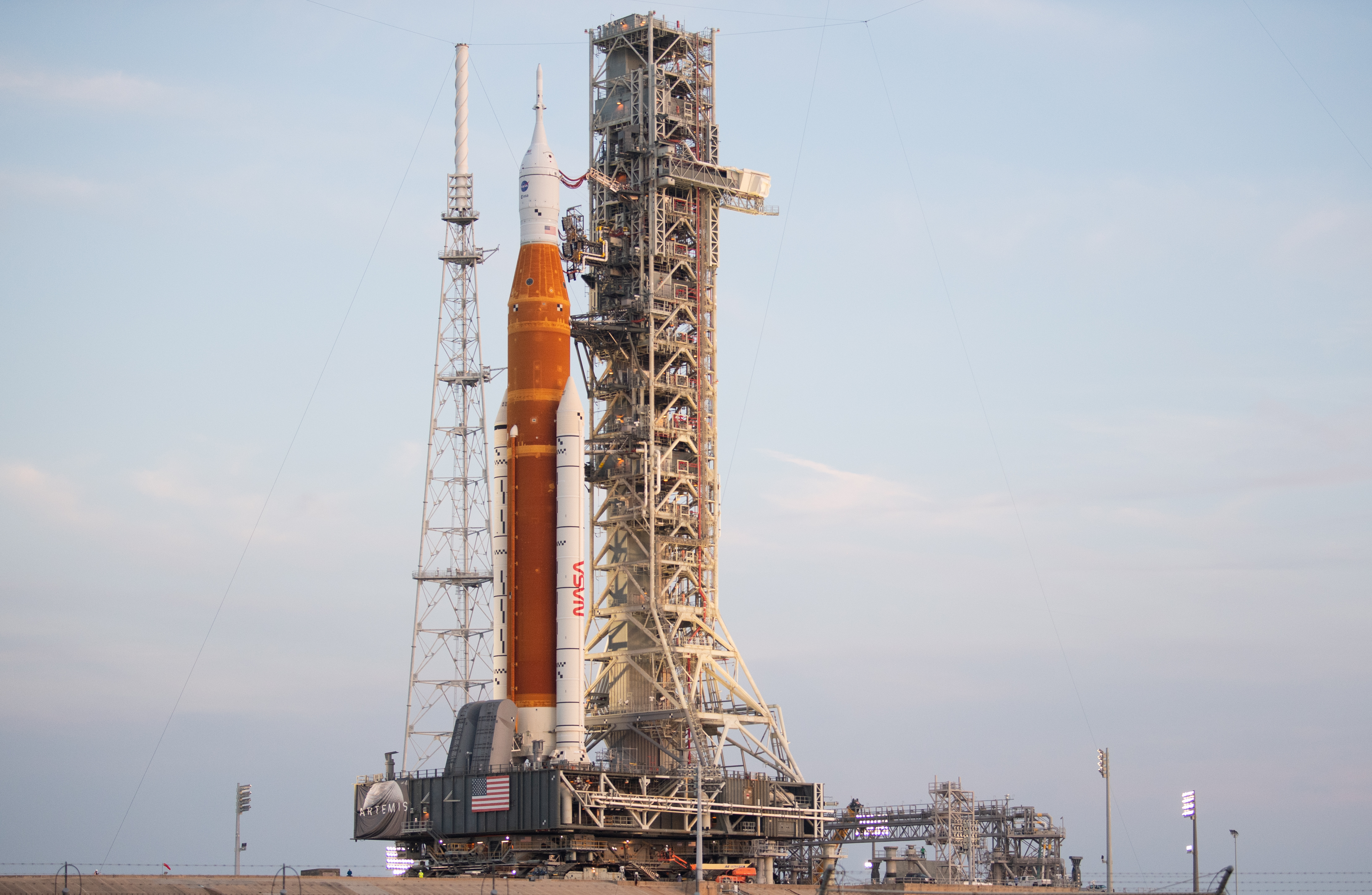
Artemis 1 and MLP on Pad 39B (and crawler beneath).

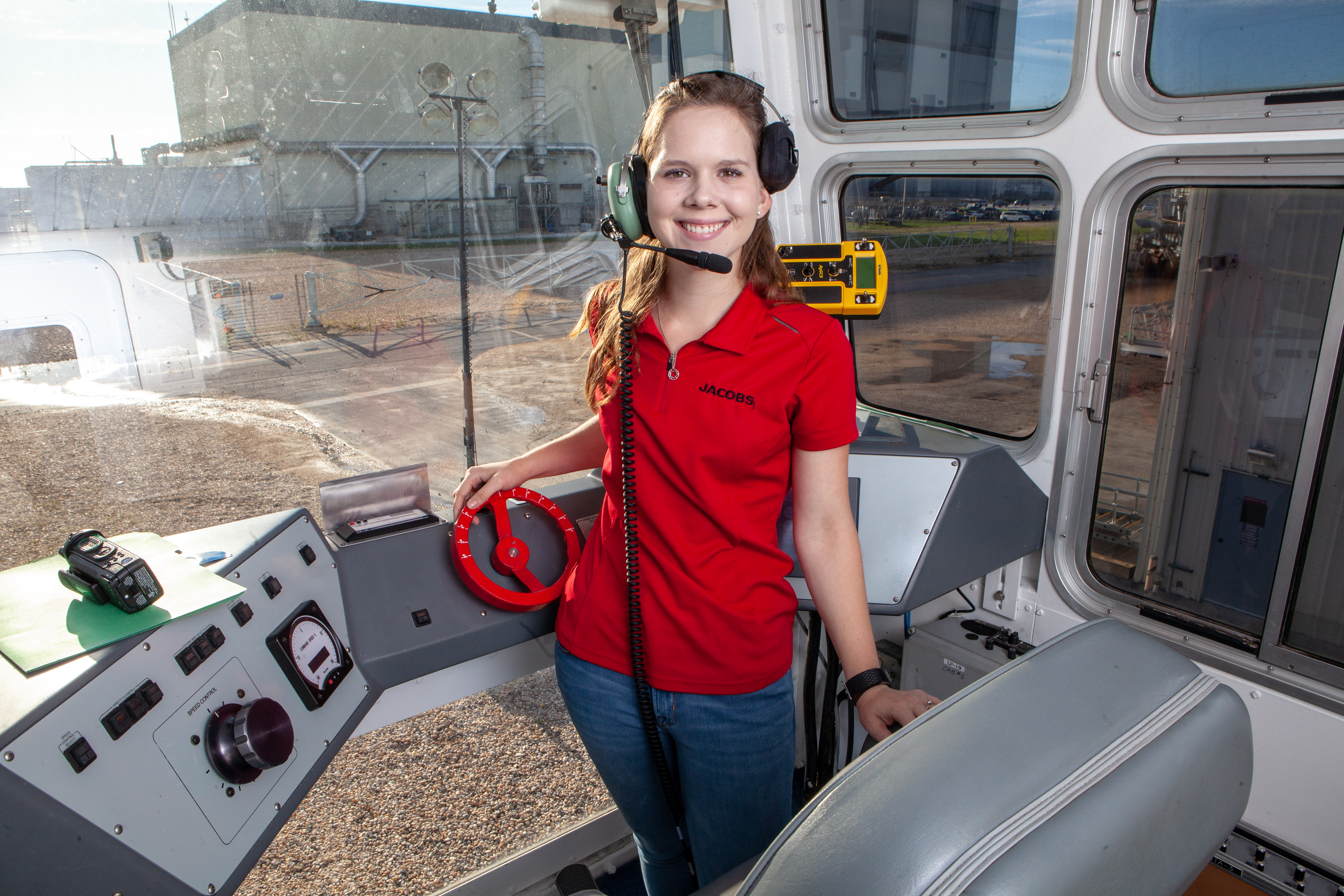
Breanne Stichler, the crawler-transporter driver, behind the controls in the cab

== See also ==
- List of largest machines
