= XGC88000 crawler crane =

Type of construction crane

- Type: Crawler crane
- Manufacturer: XCMG
- Production: 2013
- Length: 144 m (472 ft) boom length 173 m (567 ft) total length
- Height: 108 m (354 ft)
- Weight: 5,350 t (11,800,000 lb)
- Propulsion: 4x crawler tracks
- Gross power: 1923 kW
- Speed: 0.19 mph or 0.3 km/h

The XGC88000 crawler crane is a class of extremely large ultraheavy crawler crane made by XCMG. With a lifting capacity of 3,600 to 4,000 tons, a total boom length of 144 meters and a total gross weight of 5,350 tons. The XGC88000 crawler crane became the largest tracked mobile crane in the world, beating out the previous record holder, the Liebherr LR 13000, when production began in 2013. However, when it comes to absolute size, movability, and strength, the title still goes to the Honghai Crane which runs on rails.

It is also one of the largest ground vehicles in current operation, and – by its official production in 2013 – became the largest self-propelled ground vehicle by gross size, beating out the NASA crawler-transporters.

== Design specifications ==
The XGC88000 crawler crane, unlike the majority of crawler cranes, comes in two sections. The primary section consists of the crane itself, which boasts a maximum boom length of 144 meters, a maximum total length of 173 meters (including the counterweight radius), a maximum height (when fully erect) of 108 meters, a lifting capacity ranging between 3,600 and 4,000 tons (although it managed to lift a maximum overload of 4,500 tons), and a maximum lifting momentum of 88,000 ton-meter.

The vehicle itself is powered by three 641 kW (860 hp) U.S. Cummins engine units outputting a total power of 1,923 kW (2,579 hp). Each power unit could act as a mobile hydraulic power working station. Moreover, they can also work as an additional power source during the crane assembly/disassembly process to improve assembly efficiency, as well as act as an additional spare unit for each other. The crane driver sits in a large spacious cabin the size of a large office room. The cabin has an airconditioner, a seat, and a small sofa to accommodate three additional passengers.

The second section is a separate tracked compartment which essentially holds the crane's counterweight in total. The counterweight has a total height of 9.7 meters, a total length of 29 meters and a weight of 2,900 tons. The compartment houses its own driver's cockpit that can be independently driven and requires a working radius of 29 meters. The maximum weight of the vehicle clocks in at nearly 5,400 tons in weight.

== See also ==
- Honghai Crane - The largest mobile crane of any type.
- List of largest machines
