= Bag lady =

Bag lady may refer to:

- "Bag Lady", a 2000 single by Erykah Badu
- "Bag Lady", a 1996 song by Audio Adrenaline from the album Bloom
- A pejorative term for women facing homelessness

== See also ==
- Bag (disambiguation)
- Lady (disambiguation)
