= Spreader (mining) =

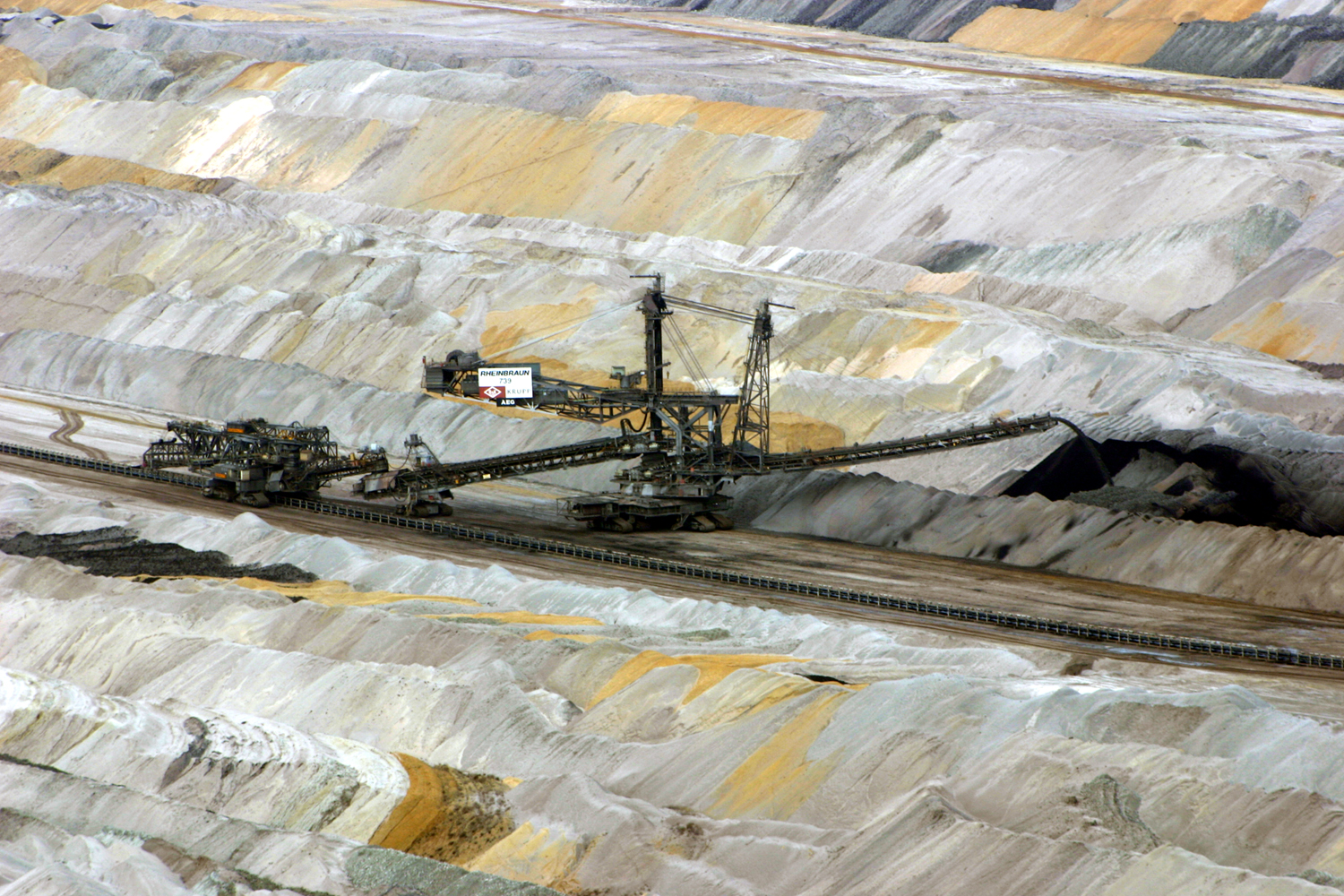
Bild 4. Spreader(Absetzer (ger)) in the Hambach open pit.

Spreaders in mining are heavy equipment used in surface mining and mechanical engineering/civil engineering. The primary function of a spreader is to act as a continuous spreading machine in large-scale open pit mining operations.

== Structure ==
A Spreader's superstructure may be seen as superficially similar to that of a bucket-wheel excavator, however, its most striking difference is that, instead of a bucket-wheel at the end of the boom, it is a discharge boom.

The spreader's design can vary, ranging from conventional single-boom spreaders to more modified two-conveyor compact spreaders. The main parts of a spreader usually come in four signature parts. The first is the signature receiving boom with or without a support crawler track. The second is the main body superstructure itself. The third is the sub-structure with crawler tracks. And the fourth and final being the discharge boom itself. The discharge boom can be fixed, liftable or slewable and is determined by specific operational requirements.

Spreaders therefore are incredibly large ground vehicles, often approaching the sizes of large bucket-wheel excavators in comparison, as some spreaders have capacities range up to 20,000 m³/h, with discharge boom lengths reaching 195m.

== Operations ==
Bucket-wheel excavators, BWEs, are used for continuous overburden removal in surface mining applications. They use their cutting wheels to strip away a section of earth (the working block) dictated by the size of the excavator.

The overburden is then delivered to the discharge boom, which transfers the cut earth to another machine for transfer it to the central collection area where the material will be sorted. Then the remains of the overburden will be transported to the spreader which then scatters the overburden at the dumping ground.

Although it may appear similar in function and appearance to stackers, the purpose of the spreader is to receive overburden from the haulage conveyor from the sorting area and dump it in an orderly and efficient manner, whereas a Stacker simply piles bulk material onto a stockpile so that the resulting reclaimer could recover it. Moreover, spreaders usually run on tank tracks whereas stackers exclusively run on rails.

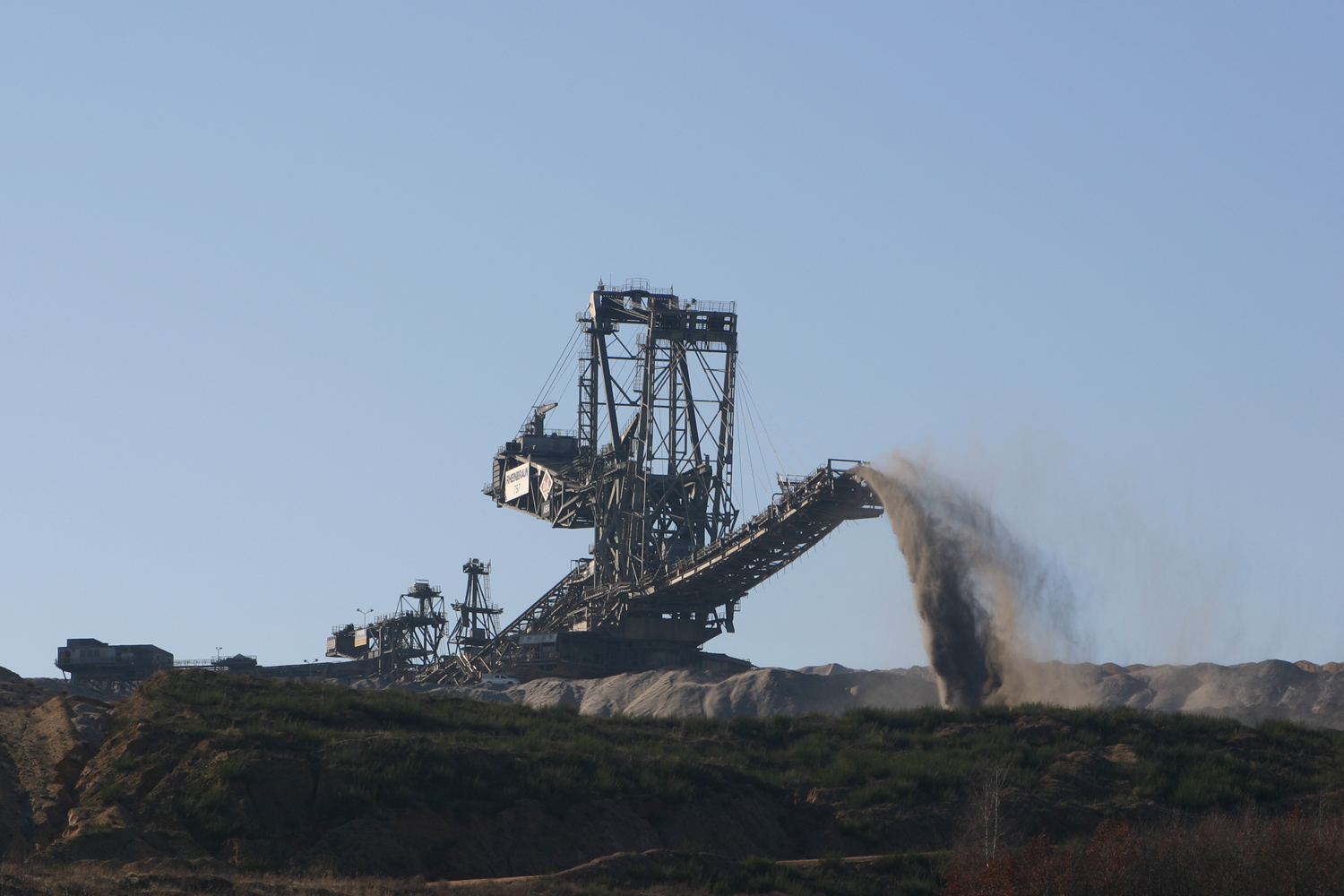
Bild 5. Spreader(Absetzer (ger))in the Sophienhöhe open pit.

== See also ==
- Coal preparation plant
- Bucket-wheel excavator
- Stacker
- Reclaimer
