= Bağban, Ujar =

Bağban
- Municipality
- Location within Azerbaijan
- Coordinates: 40°24′06″N 47°48′03″E
- Country: Azerbaijan
- Rayon: Ujar

Population
  - Total: 1,698
- Time zone: UTC+4 (AZT)
  - Summer (DST): UTC+5 (AZT)

Bağban (also, Bagman) is a village and municipality in the Ujar Rayon of Azerbaijan. It has a population of 1,698.
