= Bagger 293 =

Giant bucket-wheel excavator

Coordinates: 50°53′23″N 6°30′51″E

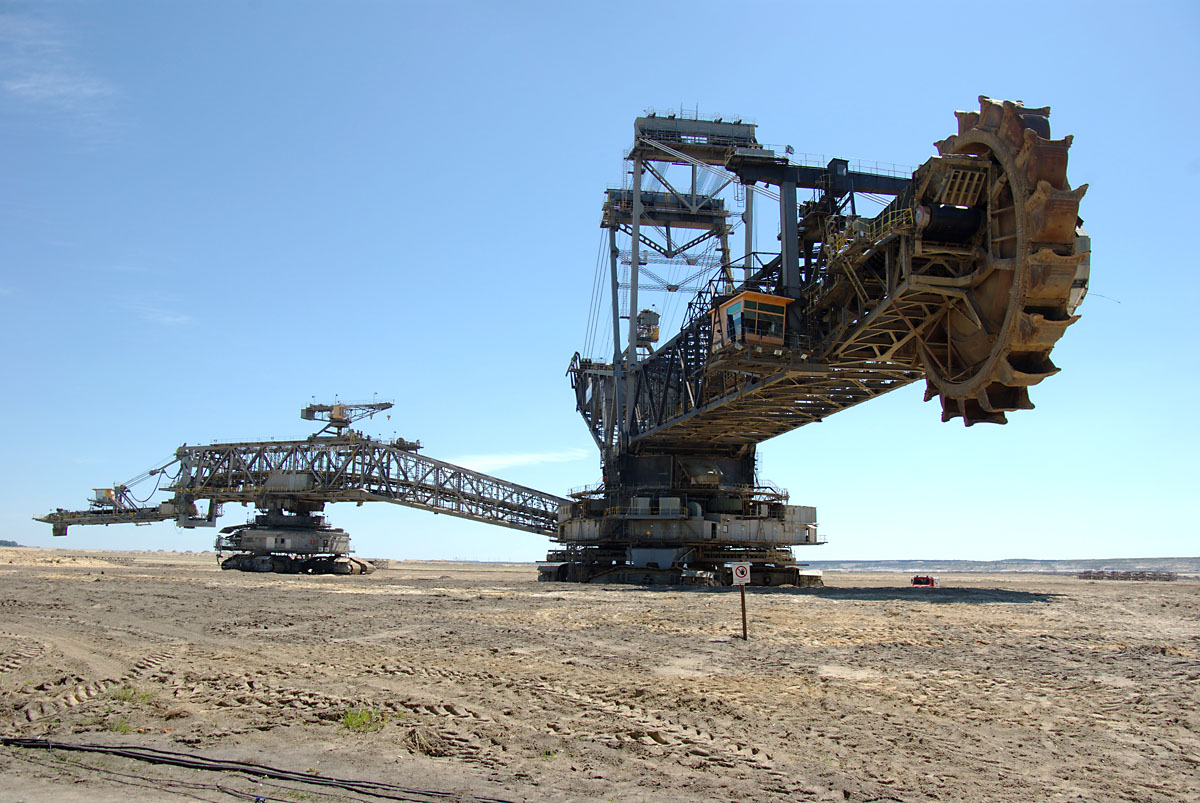
- Bagger 293 in Germany in 2010
- Type: Bucket-wheel Excavator
- Manufacturer: TAKRAF
- Production: 1995
- Length: 225 m (738.2 ft)
- Width: 46 m (151 ft)
- Height: 96 m (314.9 ft)
- Weight: 14,200 t (31,300,000 lb)
- Propulsion: 12 x caterpillar tracks
- Gross power: 16.56 megawatts of externally supplied electricity
- Speed: 2 to 10 m (6.6 to 32.8 ft) per minute (0.1 to 0.6 km/h)
- Blade capacity: 21 m (69.9 ft) in diameter, 18 buckets each holding 19.6 cubic yards (15.0 m^{3}) or 16.5 short tons (15.0 t)

Bagger 293, previously known as the MAN TAKRAF RB293, is a giant bucket-wheel excavator made by the German industrial company TAKRAF, formerly an East German Kombinat.

It owns and shares some records for terrestrial vehicle size in the Guinness Book of Records. Bagger 293 was built in 1999, one of a group of similar sized 'sibling' vehicles such as the Bagger 281 (built in 1958), Bagger 285 (1975), Bagger 287 (1976), Bagger 288 (1978), and Bagger 291 (1993). Moreover, like the Bagger 288, the Bagger 293 cost around 100 million US dollars at the time of its construction with exactly the same construction and assemblage time period of ten years.

It is used in a brown coal mine near Hambach in Germany. It is called Bagger 293 by its current owner, RWE Power AG (the second-largest energy producer of Germany). It was called RB293 by its former owner, the brown coal company Rheinbraun, which in 1932 became a subsidiary of RWE. During an internal reshuffle in 2003 it merged with another daughter company to form RWE Power AG. Manufacturer TAKRAF generally refers to it as an excavator of the Type SRs 8000.

Like its siblings, the Bagger 293 is operated by a disproportionately small crew of just five.

== Statistics ==
Bagger 293 shares with Bagger 288 the Guinness World Record for tallest terrestrial vehicle, at 96 metres (315 feet) tall. It is 225 metres (738 feet) long (same as Bagger 287), weighs 14,200 tonnes (31 million pounds), and requires five people to operate. It is powered by an external power source providing 16.56 megawatts. The bucket-wheel itself is over 21.3 metres (70 feet) in diameter with 18 buckets, each of which can hold over 15 cubic metres (530 cubic feet) of material.

It can move 240,000 m^{3} (8.5 million ft^{3}) of soil per day, weighing around 218,880 tonnes (480 million pounds), the same as Bagger 288.

== See also ==
- Bucket-wheel excavator – Heavy mining excavator
- Landship – Large land vehicle
- List of largest machines
