= Bagger 288 =

Bucket wheel excavator built by the German company Krupp

Coordinates: 51.065°N 6.5078°E

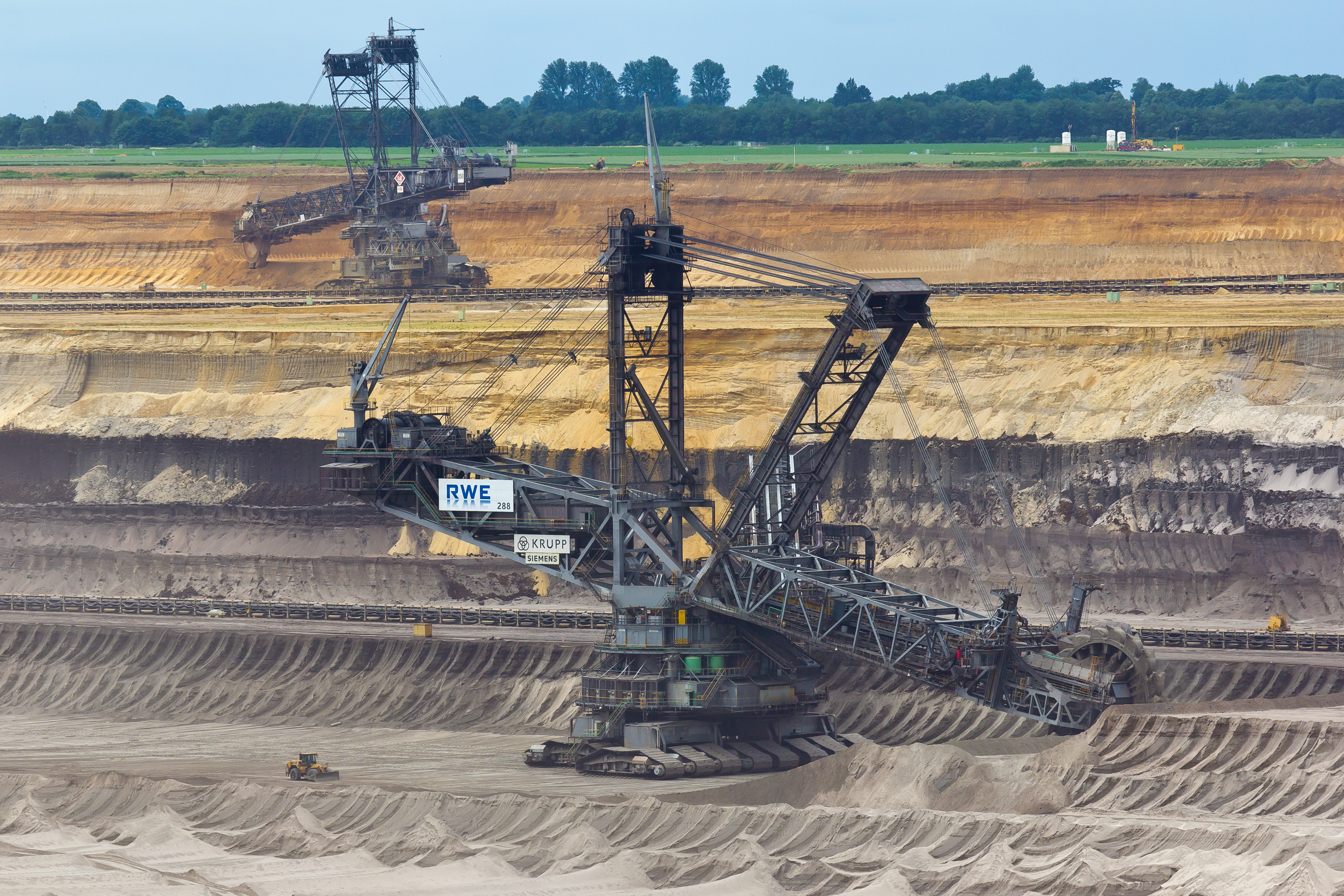
- Type: Bucket-wheel Excavator
- Manufacturer: ThyssenKrupp (Germany)
- Production: 1978
- Length: 220 m (721 ft)
- Width: 46 m (151 ft)
- Height: 96 m (315 ft)
- Weight: 13,500 t (29,800,000 lb)
- Propulsion: 12 x caterpillar tracks
- Gross power: 16.56 megawatts of externally supplied electricity
- Speed: 2 to 10 m (6.6 to 32.8 ft) per minute (0.1 to 0.6 km/h)
- Blade capacity: 21 m (70.1 ft) in diameter, 18 buckets each holding 8.6 cubic yards (6.6 m^{3}) or 7.2 short tons (6.5 t)

Bagger 288 (Excavator 288), previously known as the MAN TAKRAF RB288 built by the German company Krupp for the energy and mining firm Rheinbraun, is a bucket-wheel excavator or mobile strip mining machine.

When its construction was completed in 1978, Bagger 288 superseded Marion 6360 as the heaviest land vehicle in the world (Marion 6360 weighed 12,700 metric tons). It took five years to design and manufacture and five years to assemble, with total cost reaching $100 million. In 1995, it was itself superseded by the slightly heavier Bagger 293 (14,200 tons). XCMG's XGC88000 Crawler Crane remains the largest self-propelled land vehicle in the world, since bucket-wheel excavators are powered by an external power source, and the Overburden Conveyor Bridge F60s hold the title of largest land vehicle of any type by physical dimensions.

Like its siblings, the Bagger 288 requires a disproportionately small number of people to operate, at just five total. Whilst Bagger 288 is considered a "sibling vehicle" with Bagger 293, it is unclear if 288 receives the same moniker as 293's Type SRs 8000 by TAKRAF.

== Objective ==
The Bagger 288 was built for the job of removing overburden before coal mining at the Hambach surface mine in Germany. It can excavate 240,000 tons of coal or 240,000 cubic metres of overburden daily – the equivalent of a soccer field dug to 30 m (98 ft) deep. The coal produced in one day fills 2400 coal wagons. The excavator is up to 220 m (721 ft) long (slightly shorter than Baggers 287 and 293) and approximately 96 m (315 feet) high. In fact, the Bagger 288 alongside its siblings, are so large, that it has its own on-board toiletry and kitchenette rooms. The Bagger's operation requires 16.56 megawatts of externally supplied electricity. It can travel 2 to 10 m (6.6 to 32.8 ft) per minute (0.1 to 0.6 km/h). The chassis of the main section is 46 m (151 ft) wide and sits on three rows of four caterpillar track assemblies, each 3.8 m (12 ft) wide. The large surface area of the tracks means the ground pressure of the Bagger 288 is very small (1.71 bar or 24.8 psi); this allows the excavator to travel over gravel, earth and even grass without leaving a significant track. It has a minimum turning radius of approximately 50 metres, and can climb a maximum gradient of 1:18 (5° incline).

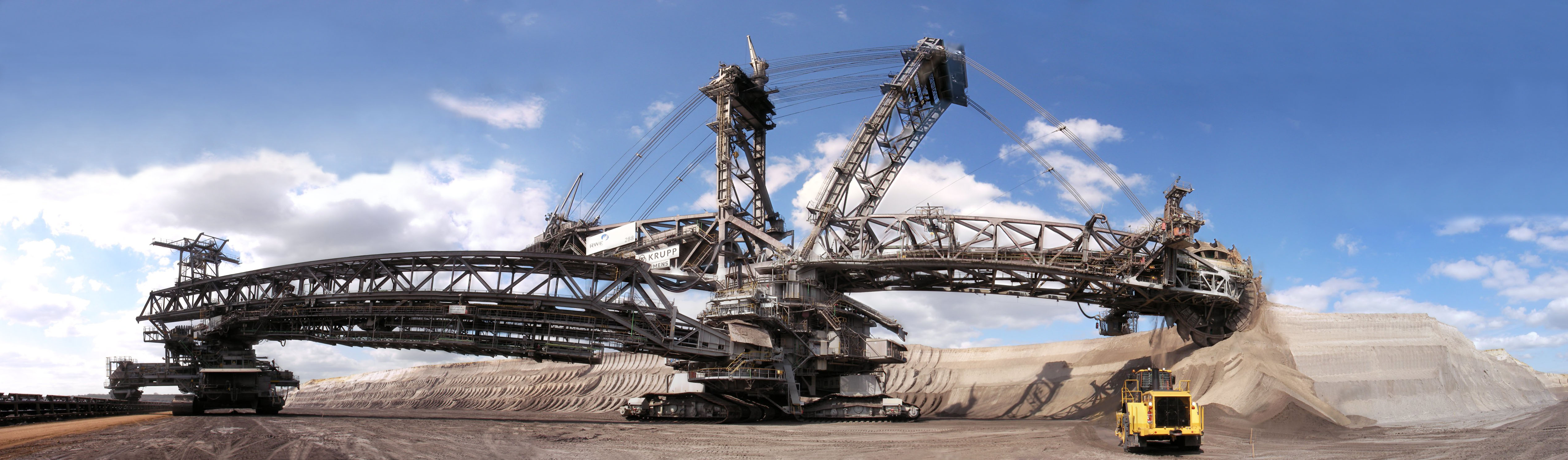
The Bagger 288 bucket-wheel excavator, beside a Caterpillar Inc. model 824H front end loader for size comparison

The excavating head itself is 21.6 m (70 ft 10 in) in diameter and has 18 buckets each holding 6.6 cubic metres (8.6 yd^{3}) of overburden.

By February 2001, the excavator had completely exposed the coal source at the Tagebau Hambach mine and was no longer needed there. In three weeks it made a 22-kilometre (14 mi) trip to the Tagebau Garzweiler, travelling across Autobahn 61, the river Erft, a railroad line, and several roads. The move cost nearly 15 million German marks and required a team of seventy workers. Rivers were crossed by placing large steel pipes for the water to flow through and providing a smooth surface over the pipes with rocks and gravel. Special grass was seeded to smooth its passage over valuable terrain. Moving Bagger 288 in one piece was more economical than disassembling the excavator and moving it piece by piece.

The Bagger 288 is one of a group of similar sized and built vehicles, such as Bagger 281 (built in 1958), Bagger 285 (1975), Bagger 287 (1976), Bagger 293 (1995), etc.

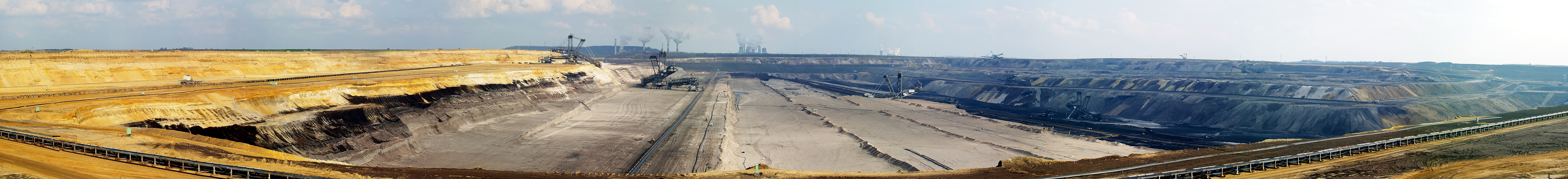
288 and related excavators at the Garzweiler stripmine

== In popular culture ==
- In 2009, the British comedian Joel Veitch published a song dedicated to the Bagger 288 on the album Spongs In the Key of Life. In the lyrics of the song, Bagger 288 is built to protect mankind from Godzillas and doom robots from the future. In the music video, the song is accompanied by clips from a German TV documentary about bucket excavators in the Ruhr area.
- In the film Ghost Rider: Spirit of Vengeance (2012), the rider possesses a Bagger 288, turning it into a fiery vehicle of destruction against his enemies.
- In the Book After the Revolution by Robert Evans, the post-human city "The City of Wheels" is built on a Bagger 288.
- In the film Hunger Games: Catching Fire, the Bagger 288 is visible in the background of District 12 scenes.

== See also ==
- List of largest machines
