= Honghai Crane =

Largest movable gantry crane

- Type: Gantry crane
- Manufacturer: Chinese Honghua Group
- Production: 2014
- Width: 150 m (492 ft 2 in)
- Height: 124 m (406 ft 10 in)
- Weight: 11,000 t (24,300,000 lb)
- Propulsion: 2x rails, 2x bogies
- Gross power: 1800 kW

The Honghai Crane is a mobile gantry crane built by the Chinese Honghua Group. It was completed in Jiangsu in 2014, becoming the largest movable gantry crane by lift capacity, being capable of lifting 22,000 tonnes to a height of 65 m.

== Description ==
The Honghai Crane is 150m tall, has a span of 124m and the weight of the steel structure is 11,000 tonnes, excluding the spreader. It has a maximum lifting height of 71m and a total of 48 hanging points, each with a lifting capacity of 300 tonnes. The crane has an operating power of 1800 kW. The total weight of the crane, including the spreader, is said to be 14,800 tonnes. The crane was first commissioned in November–December 2014 when it was utilized to build the hull of a platform supply vessel in the company's yard in Jiangsu.

== Operations ==
The crane was used for the building of a platform supply vessel, which was delivered to Danish marine services company Nordic Offshore Supply Unlimited in 2015. The Honghai Crane will be further utilized for the building of an offshore semi-submersible drilling rig for Orion Group.

== See also ==
- List of largest Chinese companies
- List of largest manufacturing companies by revenue
- List of companies of China
