= Bucket-wheel excavator =

Heavy mining excavator

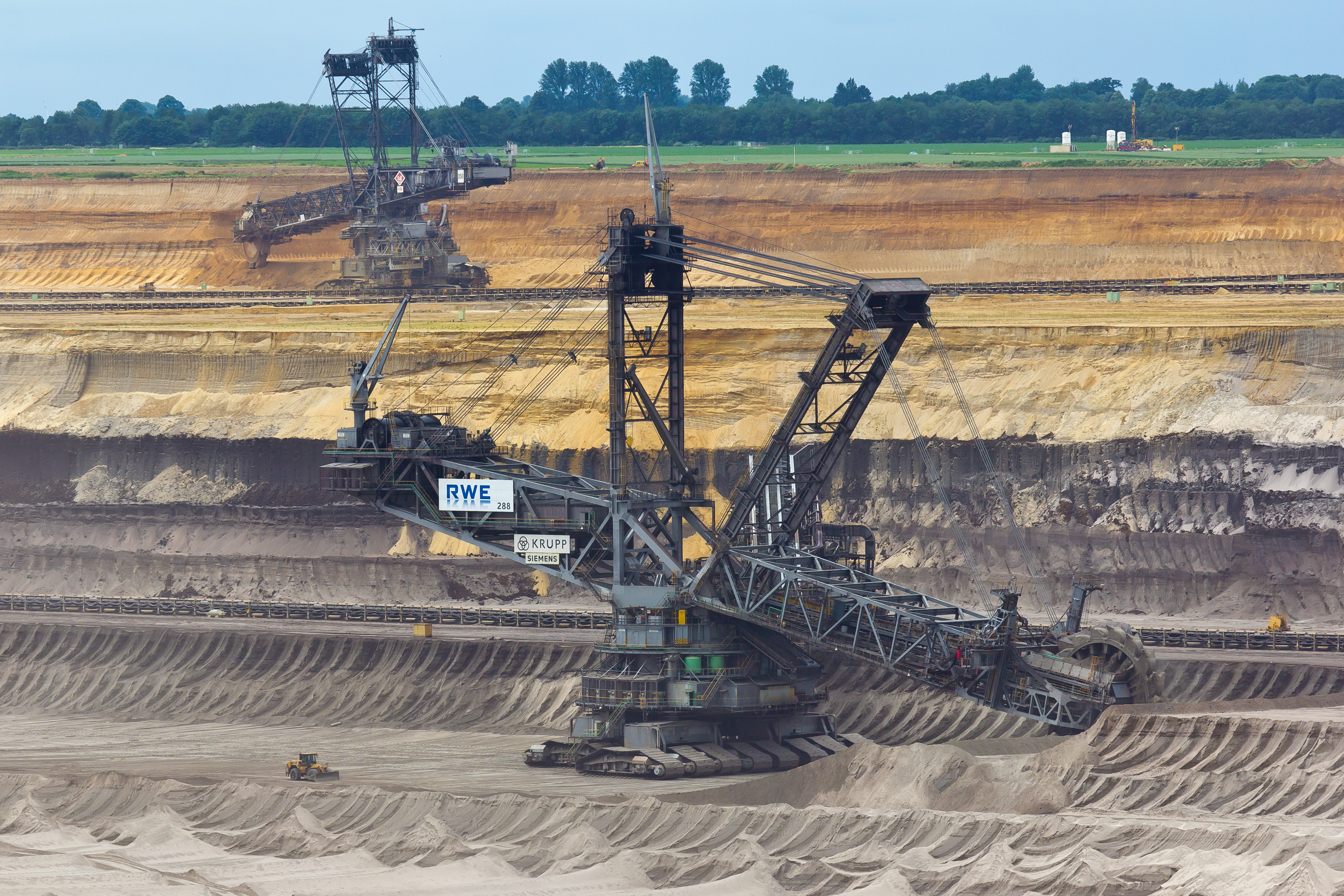
Bucket wheel excavators in Garzweiler surface mine, Germany. Note the 40-ton CAT wheeled dozer at lower left for size comparison

A bucket-wheel excavator (BWE) is a large heavy equipment machine used in surface mining.

Their primary function is that of a continuous digging machine in large-scale open-pit mining operations, removing thousands of tons of overburden a day. What sets them apart from other large-scale mining equipment, such as bucket chain excavators, is their use of a large wheel consisting of a continuous pattern of buckets which scoop material as the wheel turns. They are among the largest land or sea vehicles ever produced. The 14,200-ton Bagger 293 holds the Guinness World Record for the heaviest land-based vehicle ever built.

== History ==
Bucket-wheel excavator in open-pit mine Garzweiler (Video, 1:40 Min., ca. 9 MB)

Bucket-wheel excavators have been used in mining for the past century, with some of the first being manufactured in the 1920s. They are used in conjunction with many other pieces of mining machinery (conveyor belts, spreaders, crushing stations, heap-leach systems, etc.) to move and mine massive amounts of overburden (waste). While the overall concepts that go into a BWE have not changed much, their size has grown drastically since the end of World War II.

In the 1950s two German mining firms ordered the world's first extremely large BWEs, and had three BWEs built for mining lignite near Cologne, Germany. The German BWEs had a wheel of over 16 m (52 ft) in diameter, weighed 5,500 short tons (5,000 t) and were over 180 m (600 ft) long, with eighteen crawler units for movement and could cut a swath of over 180 m (600 ft) at one time

BWEs built since the 1990s, such as the Bagger 293, have reached sizes as large as 96 m (315 ft) tall, 225 m (738 ft) long, and as heavy as 14,200 t (31,300,000 lb). The bucket-wheel itself can be over 21 m (70 ft) in diameter with as many as 20 buckets, each of which can hold over 15 m^{3} (20 cu yd) of material. BWEs have also advanced with respect to the extreme conditions in which they are now capable of operating. Many BWEs have been designed to operate in climates with temperatures as low as −45 °C (−49 °F). Developers are now moving their focus toward automation and the use of electrical power.

== Structure ==
A bucket wheel excavator (BWE) consists of a superstructure to which several more components are fixed.

The bucket wheel from which the machines get their name is a large, round wheel with a configuration of scoops which is fixed to a boom and is capable of rotating. Material picked up by the cutting wheel is transferred back along the boom. In early cell-type bucket wheels, the material was transferred through a chute leading from each bucket, while newer cell-less and semi-cell designs use a stationary chute through which all of the buckets discharge.

A discharge boom receives material through the superstructure from the cutting boom and carries it away from the machine, frequently to an external conveyor system.

A counterweight boom balances the cutting boom and is cantilevered either on the lower part of the superstructure (in the case of compact BWEs) or the upper part (in the case of mid-size C-frame BWEs). In the larger BWEs, all three booms are supported by cables running across towers at the top of the superstructure.

Beneath the superstructure lay the movement systems. On older models these would be rails for the machine to travel along, but newer BWEs are frequently equipped with crawlers, which grant them increased flexibility of motion.

To allow it to complete its duties, the superstructure of a BWE is capable of rotating about a vertical axis (slewing). The cutting boom can be tilted up and down (hoisting). The speeds of these operations are on the orders of 30 m/min and 5 m/min, respectively. Slewing is driven by large gears, while hoisting generally makes use of a cable system.

=== Size ===
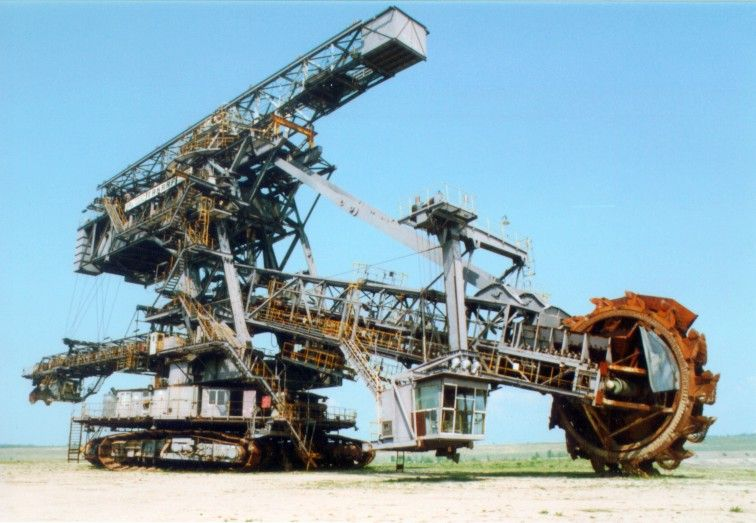
Bucket wheel excavator in Ferropolis, Germany

The scale of BWEs varies significantly and is dependent on the intended application. Compact BWEs designed by ThyssenKrupp may have boom lengths as small as six metres (20 ft), weigh 50 tons, and move 100 m^{3} (3,500 cu ft) of earth per hour. Their larger models reach boom lengths of 80 m (260 ft), weigh 13,000 tons, and move 12,500 m^{3} (440,000 cu ft) per hour. The largest BWE ever constructed is TAKRAF's Bagger 293, which is 93 meters tall and 225 meters long, weighs 14,200 tonnes and is capable of moving 240,000 m^{3} (8,500,000 cu ft) of overburden every day. Excavations of 380,000 m^{3} (13,000,000 cu ft) per day have been recorded. The BWEs used in the United States tend to be smaller than those constructed in Germany.

== Operation ==
BWEs are used for continuous overburden removal in surface mining applications. They use their cutting wheels to strip away a section of earth (the working block) dictated by the size of the excavator. Through hoisting, the working block can include area both above and below the level of the machine (the bench level). By slewing, the excavator can reach through a horizontal range.

The overburden is then delivered to the discharge boom, which transfers the cut earth to another machine for transfer to a spreader. This may be a fixed belt conveyor system or a mobile conveyor with crawlers similar to those found on the BWE. Mobile conveyors permanently attached to the excavator take the burden of directing the material off of the operator. The overburden can also be transferred directly to a cross-pit Spreader, which reaches across the pit and scatters overburden at the dumping ground.

=== Automation ===
Automation of the BWEs requires integrating many sensors and electrical components such as GPS, data acquisition systems, and online monitoring capabilities. The goal of these systems is to take away some of the work from the operators in order to achieve higher mining speeds. Project managers and operators are now able to track crucial data regarding the BWEs and other machinery in the mining operations via the Internet. Sensors can detect how much material is being scooped onto the conveyor belt, and the automation system can then vary the speed on the conveyor belts in order to feed a continuous amount of material.

== Applications ==
Bucket wheel excavators and bucket chain excavators take jobs that were previously accomplished by rope shovels and draglines. They have been replaced in most applications by hydraulic excavators, but still remain in use for very large-scale operations, where they can be used for the transfer of loose materials or the excavation of soft to semi-hard overburden.

=== Lignite mining ===
The primary application of BWEs is in lignite (brown coal) mining, where they are used for soft rock overburden removal in the absence of blasting. They are useful in this capacity for their ability to continuously deliver large volumes of materials to processors, which is especially important given the continuous demand for lignite.

Because of the great demand for lignite, lignite mining has also been one of the areas of greatest development for BWEs. The additions of automated systems and greater manoeuvrability, as well as components designed for the specific application, have increased the reliability and efficiency with which BWEs deliver materials.

=== Materials handling ===
Bucket wheel technology is used extensively in bulk materials handling. Bucket wheel reclaimers are used to pick up material that has been positioned by a stacker for transport to a processing plant. Stacker/reclaimers, which combine tasks to reduce the number of required machines, also use bucket wheels to carry out their tasks.

In shipyards, bucket wheels are used for the continuous loading and unloading of ships, where they pick up material from the yard for transfer to the delivery system. Bucket chains can be used to unload material from a ship's hold. TAKRAF's continuous ship unloader is capable of removing up to 95% of the material from a ship's hold, owing to a flexibly-configured digging attachment.

=== Heap leaching ===
An extension of their other uses, BWEs are used in heap leaching processes. Heap leaching entails constructing stacks of crushed ore, through which a solvent is passed to extract valuable materials. The construction and removal of the heaps are an obvious application of stacking and reclaiming technology.

== Manufacturers and market ==
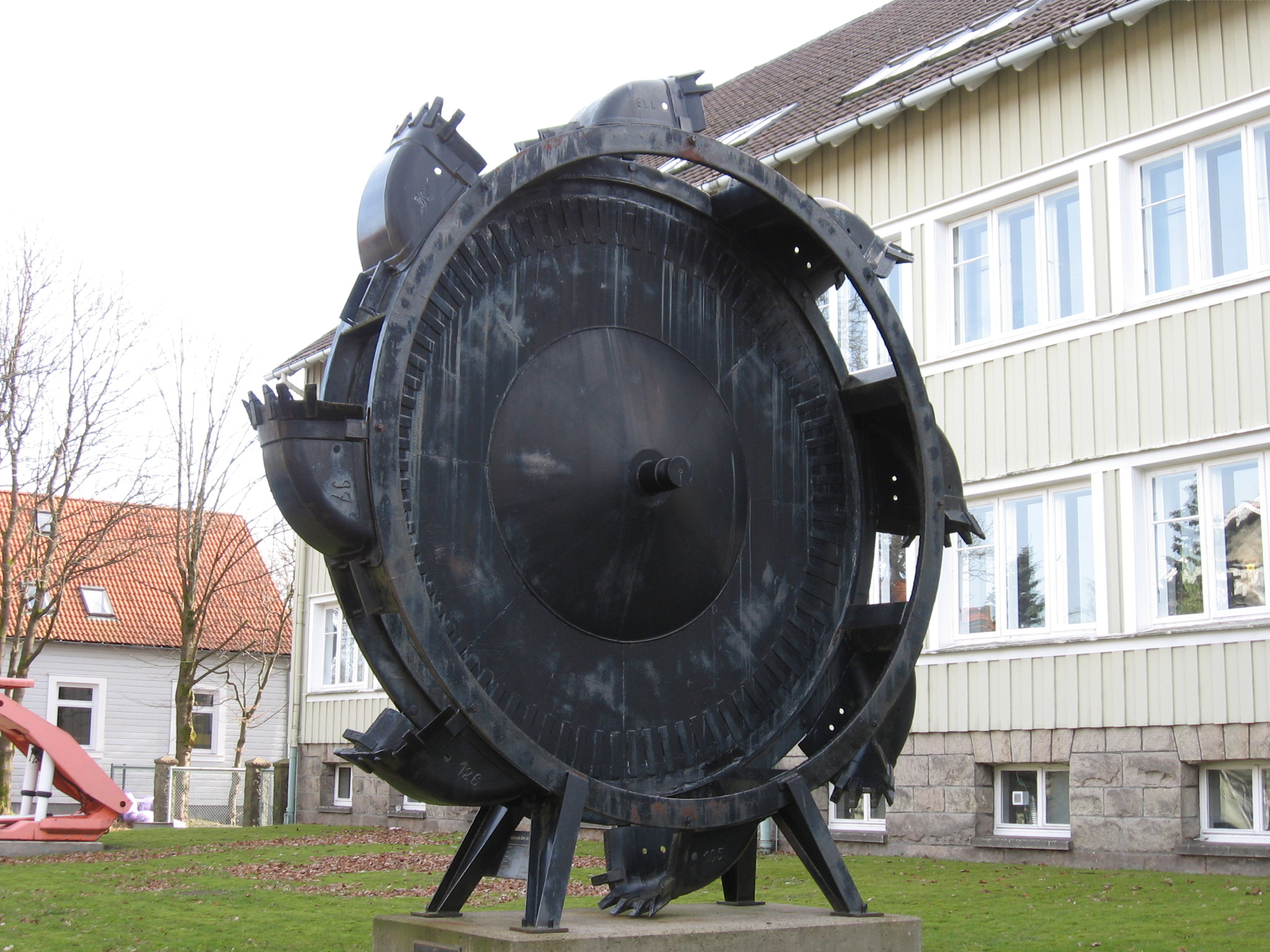
Bucket wheel

Few companies are willing or able to manufacture the massive, expensive gears required for BWEs. Unex, Czech Republic, still has the original casting forms, and is still able to manufacture BWEs. However, these machines were built to last indefinitely under continuous heavy use and strip mining is now less popular, so there is little demand for new machines. The manufacturers of BWEs and similar mining systems now receive some revenue from maintenance and refurbishing projects, but also produce large steel parts for other purposes. Current use of bucket-wheel excavators is mainly focused in the area of lignite (brown coal) mining for the production of electricity, mostly in Germany and East/Southeastern Europe. Unex has also made a BWE for extraction of diamonds from the Siberian permafrost.

== See also ==
- Bagger 288
- Bagger 293
- Bagger 1473
- Overburden Conveyor Bridge F60
- Trencher (machine)
- Bucket elevator
