= Stacker =

Large machine used in bulk material handling

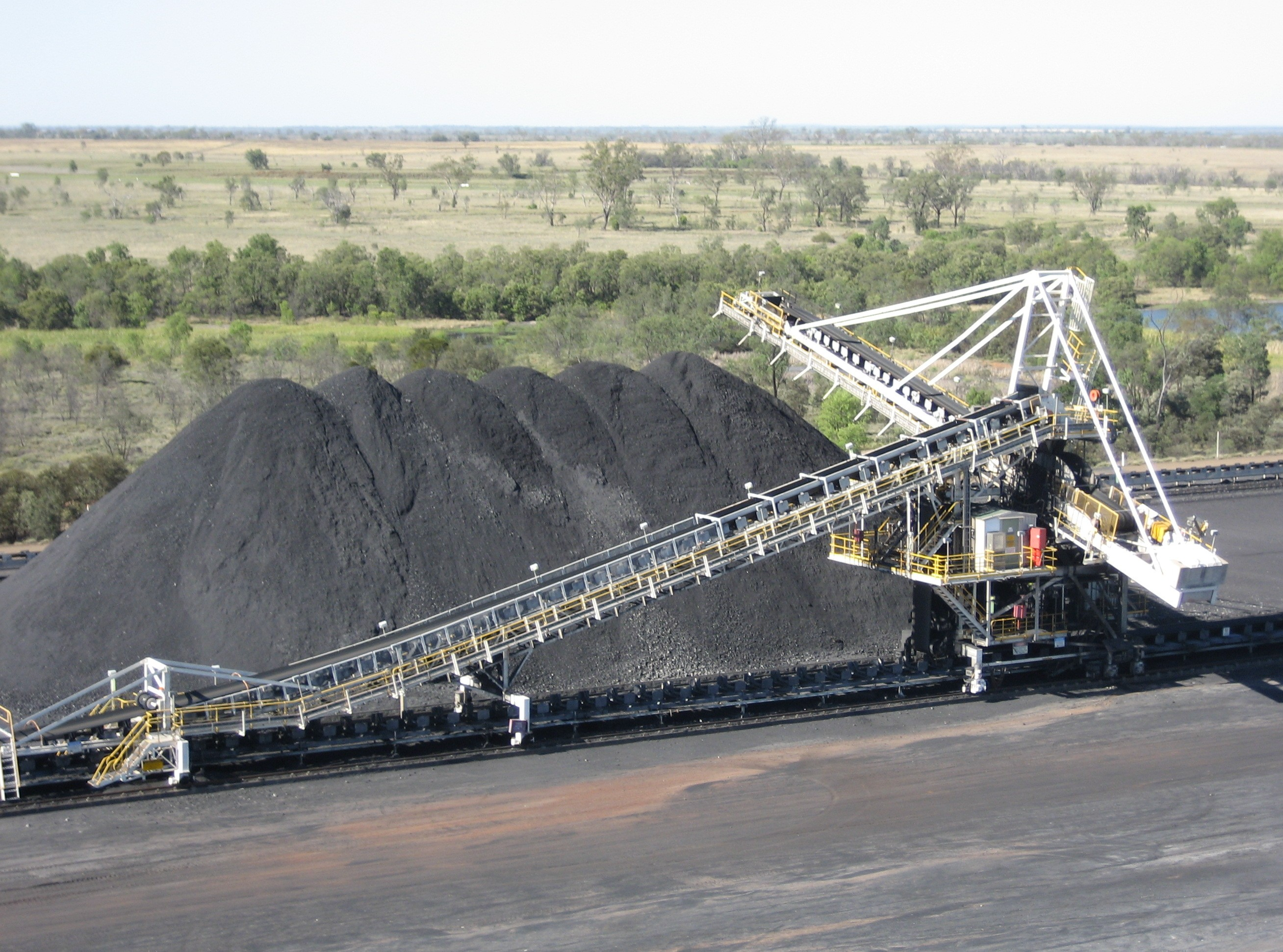
Krupp coal stacker featuring tripper conveyor and non-slewing, luffing boom at RTCA Kestrel Mine

Stacker at Garzweiler surface mine

A stacker is a large machine used in bulk material handling. Its function is to pile bulk material such as limestone, ores, coal and cereals onto a stockpile. A reclaimer can be used to recover the material.

Gold dredges in Alaska had a stacker that was a fixed part of the dredge. It carried over-size material to the tailings pile.

Stackers are nominally rated for capacity in t/h [1 t/h (0.98 long ton/h; 1.1 short ton/h)]. They normally travel on a rail between stockpiles in the stockyard. A stacker can usually move in at least two directions: horizontally along the rail and vertically by luffing (raising and lowering) its boom. Luffing of the boom minimises dust by reducing the distance that material such as coal needs to fall to the top of the stockpile. The boom is luffed upwards as the height of the stockpile increases. Some stackers can rotate the boom. This allows a single stacker to form two stockpiles, one on either side of the conveyor.

Stackers are used to stack in different patterns, such as cone stacking and chevron stacking. Stacking in a single cone tends to cause size segregation, with coarser material moving out towards the base. In raw cone ply stacking, additional cones are added next to the first cone. In chevron stacking, the stacker travels along the length of the stockpile adding layer upon layer of material.

Stackers and reclaimers were originally manually controlled, with no means of remote control. Modern machines are typically semi-automatic or fully automated, with parameters remotely set. The control system used is typically a programmable logic controller, with a human-machine interface for display, connected to a central control system.

Other than stacking, a stacker has three basic movements:

- Luffing: This is vertical movement. Stackers use either a winch mechanism with metal wire, or hydraulic cylinders, generally two. Winch mechanisms are highly reliable compared to hydraulic actuators and remain widely used, particularly in large stackers.
- Travelling: The stacker moves on a rail track, which may be broad or narrow gauge, enabling it to move around the stockyard as required. For this purpose, traction motors powered by direct current (DC) are connected by bevel gears to between 12 and 22 wheels. For manual control, all the controls are in a controller's cabin above the boom conveyor or boom. Modern stackers can be controlled remotely.
- Slewing: This is rotation of the stacker around its central axis to align or place the stockpile where required. This works mostly by a slew pinion that rotates around a slew base. This type of gear assembly is called a sun and planet gear. The axles may be multiple and are driven by DC-powered axle motors which transmit the torque via bevel or helical gears.

The conveyor belts used in stackers may be made of fabric or metal wire, depending upon the material to be handled. They are driven by pulleys, which in turn are driven by DC motors. The motors and gear are coupled by fluid coupling.

Most stackers are electrically powered by way of a trailing cable. There are basically two types of cable trailing: power cord rotating drum (PCRD) and control cable rotating drum (CCRD). Pendulum adjustments are made to ensure the proper alignment of these cables while the stacker is travelling.

== See also ==
- Coal homogenization
- Reclaimer
- Spreader (mining)
