= Subcoal =

Coal substitute made from recycled waste

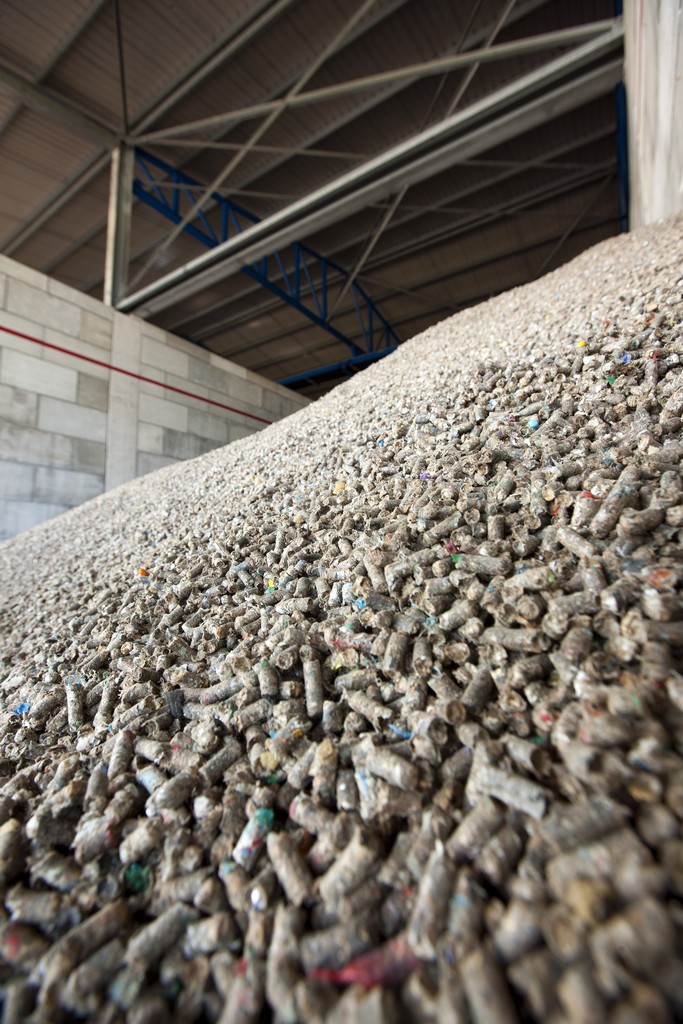
Subcoal piled up

Subcoal is a fractional substitute for coal or lignite which uses processed paper and plastic waste. The fuel pellets can be used as a secondary energy source in industrial furnaces, such as lime kilns and cement kilns, coal-fired power stations and blast furnaces. Subcoal has a caloric value comparable with lignite. The technology was developed by the Dutch chemical company DSM. A study by CE Delft stated that for the paper-plastic fraction of household waste, the Subcoal route has a better climate and overall environmental score compared to incineration in a waste incineration plant.

== Production ==
The technology consists of different treatment stages, depending on the input waste streams. The waste streams are typically purified, with recyclables being collected and sorted out of them. The waste is dried if necessary. The material is shredded to the required size and turned into pellets, with a diameter of approximately 8 mm. Terms of calorific value, ash content, chlorine contact and moisture content are important to rate the quality of the pellets. The calorific value is comparable with (and sometimes higher than) a few types of coal. The percentage of biomass is more than 50%. Because it is in pellets, Subcoal shows hydrophobic behavior and does not dissolve when the moisture content is increased, which is important when considering external storage. Subcoal is mostly dosed as a ground (pulverized) fuel. It is commercially used via various grinding media (direct firing); via a hammer mill (12 tons per hour), air-rotor mill (6 tons per hour) and via a bowl mill (4 tons per hour). Cement manufacturers, lime producers and energy providers spray the Subcoal powder with coal powder into their kilns.

Currently, there are two Subcoal producing facilities in the Netherlands, which have a combined output capacity of 80 to 90 thousand tons per year. One is implemented at a cardboard mill in the southern part of the Netherlands, with an annual output of about 15 thousand tons. The other is a standalone production facility located in the northern part of the Netherlands, with an annual output of about 70 thousand tons per year.

== Content statistics ==
Material	Specification
Net calorific value ( as received )	>20000 kJ/kg >9000 Btu/pound
Ash content	<12W .-%
Moisture content	<8W.-% DW
Chlorine	<0.8 W.-% DW
Sum heavy metals	<800 mg/kg
TOC	>50 W.% DW
Biomass	>50 W.% DW
Volatiles	>60%
Typical physical size (unground)	8 mm (length <3 cm)
Typical physical size (ground)	<5mm
Specific density	400–450 kg/m^{3}

== See also ==
- Waste-to-energy
- Refuse-derived fuel
- DSM
