= Coal blending =

Mixing of mined coal

Coal blending is the process of mixing coals after coal has been mined to achieve quality attributes that are desirable for the coal’s intended application (e.g. steam generation, coking). The quality attributes that are most important in blending will differ from one mine site to another and also depend on how the coal seams vary in quality and their final intended use. In thermal coals, quality attributes of interest often include ash, volatile matter, total Sulfur, and gross calorific value. For coking coals, additional attributes are sometimes considered including crucible swelling number, fluidity, and RoMax.

== Blending methodology ==
Blending is typically achieved through the stacking of different materials on a stockpile or within a vessel’s hatch during ship loading. Stacking methodology (e.g. Chevron, Windrow, Cone Shell, Strata) can also impact the homogeneity of the final blended material. Blending sometimes will take place prior to the Coal Handling and Processing Plant (CHPP) in order to achieve attributes (e.g. feed ash levels) that can improve CHPP production rates. Blending may take place in several locations within the demand chain including:

- Before entering the processing plant
- Immediately after the processing plant
- Train load out
- Port stockyard
- Ship loading
- At the customer stockyard

== Decision support software ==
Blending decisions impact the total tonnes of each product that a mine site is able to sell. In addition, the quality attributes of a product can impact the final sale value of the product. Because blending has a significant impact on mine site revenue, several decision support systems have been developed with the aim of improving product reliability and profitability.

=== Blend optimization ===
Blend optimization is a nonlinear combinatorial optimization problem where the objective is typically to maximize revenue, Net Present Value (NPV), or monthly product tonnage targets. Important features of the blending problem include:

- Each product may consist of many unblended seams or plys (many to 1 mapping) and each seam or ply can contribute to multiple products (1 to many mapping).
- Some products constitute a “brand” which cannot consist of blends with significantly different physical and chemical quality attributes.
- Product sale value can change over time due to changing market conditions.
- Sufficiently large scale production sizes can influence market fundamentals and thus sale price.
- Operating costs are influenced by production rate and it is generally desirable to meet a specified operating capacity for the wash plant as well as to utilize contractual haulage, rail, and shipping capacities.

Several constraints must also be taken into account including:

- maximum number of ROM types within a blend
- minimum tonnage of given ROM type within a blend
- maximum number of field stocks from which materials can be blended from

== Blend Analysis ==
Blend analysis is the process of understanding what blending options exist within a specified schedule and how these options impact product quality, projected revenue, and scheduled mining decisions. Because mathematical optimization algorithms only solve a mathematical model of the physical blending problem, it is typically necessary to make manual adjustments to blends in order to achieve practical/desirable business outcomes. Analytics software tools facilitate this process by enabling a mine planner to easily see what options exist and the consequences of these options.
