= Coal =

Combustible sedimentary rock composed primarily of carbon

- Sedimentary rock
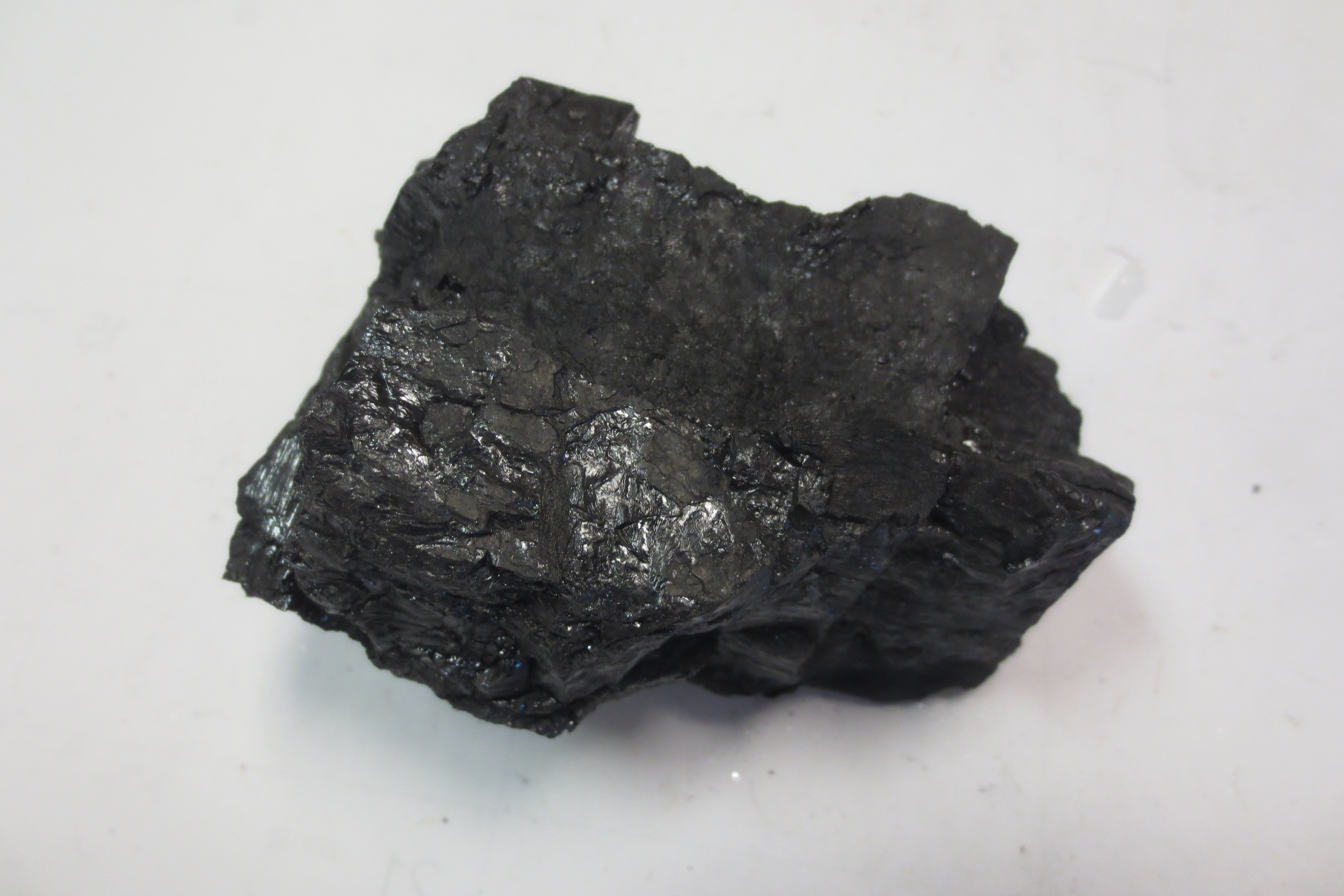
- Bituminous coal, the most common coal grade

Composition
- Primary: carbon
- Secondary: hydrogen; sulfur; oxygen; nitrogen

Coal is a combustible black or brownish-black sedimentary rock, formed as layers called coal seams. Coal is mostly carbon with variable amounts of other elements, chiefly hydrogen, sulfur, oxygen, and nitrogen. It is a fossil fuel, formed when plants decay into peat which is converted into coal by the heat and pressure of deep burial over millions of years. Vast deposits formed from wetlands called coal forests that covered much of the tropics during the late Carboniferous and early Permian.

Coal is used primarily as a fuel. While coal has been known and used for thousands of years, its usage was limited until the Industrial Revolution. With the invention of the steam engine, coal consumption increased. In 2020, coal supplied about a quarter of the world's primary energy and over a third of its electricity. Some iron and steel-making and other industrial processes burn coal.

The extraction and burning of coal damages the environment and human health, causing premature death and illness, and is the largest source of carbon dioxide contributing to climate change. Over fifteen billion tonnes of carbon dioxide were emitted by burning coal in 2024, which was more than a quarter of total global greenhouse gas emissions. (Note: Number from first cite in sentence divided by number from second cite 15.8x100/53.2=29.7%) As part of worldwide energy transition, many countries have reduced or eliminated their use of coal power. The United Nations Secretary General asked governments to stop building new coal plants by 2020.

A record amount of coal was burnt in 2024, but consumption is expected to peak before 2030. To meet the Paris Agreement target of keeping global warming below 2 °C (3.6 °F) coal use needs to halve from 2020 to 2030, and "phasing down" coal was agreed upon in the Glasgow Climate Pact.

The largest consumer and importer of coal is China, which mines almost half the world's coal, followed by India with about a tenth. Indonesia and Australia export the most, followed by Russia.

== Etymology ==
The word originally took the form col in Old English, from reconstructed Proto-Germanic *kula(n), from Proto-Indo-European root *g(e)u-lo- "live coal". Germanic cognates include the Old Frisian kole, Middle Dutch cole, Dutch kool, Old High German chol, German Kohle and Old Norse kol. Irish gual is also a cognate via the Indo-European root.

== Formation of coal ==
Example chemical structure of coal

The conversion of dead vegetation into coal is called coalification. At various times in the geologic past, the Earth had dense forests in low-lying areas. In these wetlands, the process of coalification began when dead plant matter was protected from oxidation, usually by mud or acidic water, and was converted into peat. The resulting peat bogs, which trapped immense amounts of carbon, were eventually deeply buried by sediments. Then, over millions of years, the heat and pressure of deep burial caused the loss of water, methane and carbon dioxide and increased the proportion of carbon. The grade of coal produced depended on the maximum pressure and temperature reached, with lignite (also called "brown coal") produced under relatively mild conditions, and sub-bituminous coal, bituminous coal, or anthracite coal (also called "hard coal" or "black coal") produced in turn with increasing temperature and pressure.

Of the factors involved in coalification, temperature is much more important than either pressure or time of burial. Subbituminous coal can form at temperatures as low as 35 to 80 °C (95 to 176 °F) while anthracite requires a temperature of at least 180 to 245 °C (356 to 473 °F).

Although coal is known from most geologic periods, 90% of all coal beds were deposited in the Carboniferous and Permian periods. Paradoxically, this was during the Late Paleozoic icehouse, a time of global glaciation. However, the drop in global sea level accompanying the glaciation exposed continental shelves that had previously been submerged, and to these were added wide river deltas produced by increased erosion due to the drop in base level. These widespread areas of wetlands provided ideal conditions for coal formation. The rapid formation of coal ended with the coal gap in the Permian–Triassic extinction event, where coal is rare.

Favorable geography alone does not explain the extensive Carboniferous coal beds. Other factors contributing to rapid coal deposition were high oxygen levels, above 30%, that promoted intense wildfires and formation of charcoal that was all but indigestible by decomposing organisms; high carbon dioxide levels that promoted plant growth; and the nature of Carboniferous forests, which included lycophyte trees whose determinate growth meant that carbon was not tied up in heartwood of living trees for long periods.

One theory suggested that about 360 million years ago, some plants evolved the ability to produce lignin, a complex polymer that made their cellulose stems much harder and more woody. The ability to produce lignin led to the evolution of the first trees. But bacteria and fungi did not immediately evolve the ability to decompose lignin, so the wood did not fully decay but became buried under sediment, eventually turning into coal. About 300 million years ago, mushrooms and other fungi developed this ability, ending the main coal-formation period of earth's history. Although some authors pointed at some evidence of lignin degradation during the Carboniferous, and suggested that climatic and tectonic factors were a more plausible explanation, reconstruction of ancestral enzymes by phylogenetic analysis corroborated a hypothesis that lignin degrading enzymes appeared in fungi approximately 200 MYa.

One likely tectonic factor was the Central Pangean Mountains, an enormous range running along the equator that reached its greatest elevation near this time. Climate modeling suggests that the Central Pangean Mountains contributed to the deposition of vast quantities of coal in the late Carboniferous. The mountains created an area of year-round heavy precipitation, with no dry season typical of a monsoon climate. This is necessary for the preservation of peat in coal swamps.

Coal is known from Precambrian strata, which predate land plants. This coal is presumed to have originated from residues of algae.

Sometimes coal seams (also known as coal beds) are interbedded with other sediments in a cyclothem. Cyclothems are thought to have their origin in glacial cycles that produced fluctuations in sea level, which alternately exposed and then flooded large areas of continental shelf.

=== Chemistry of coalification ===
The woody tissue of plants is composed mainly of cellulose, hemicellulose, and lignin. Modern peat is mostly lignin, with a content of cellulose and hemicellulose ranging from 5% to 40%. Various other organic compounds, such as waxes and nitrogen- and sulfur-containing compounds, are also present. Lignin has a weight composition of about 54% carbon, 6% hydrogen, and 30% oxygen, while cellulose has a weight composition of about 44% carbon, 6% hydrogen, and 49% oxygen. Bituminous coal has a composition of about 84.4% carbon, 5.4% hydrogen, 6.7% oxygen, 1.7% nitrogen, and 1.8% sulfur, on a weight basis. The low oxygen content of coal shows that coalification removed most of the oxygen and much of the hydrogen a process called carbonization.

Carbonization proceeds primarily by dehydration, decarboxylation, and demethanation. Dehydration removes water molecules from the maturing coal via reactions such as

2 R–OH → R–O–R + H_{2}O

Decarboxylation removes carbon dioxide from the maturing coal:

RCOOH → RH + CO_{2}

while demethanation proceeds by reaction such as

2 R-CH_{3} → R-CH_{2}-R + CH_{4}
R-CH_{2}-CH_{2}-CH_{2}-R → R-CH=CH-R + CH_{4}

In these formulas, R represents the remainder of a cellulose or lignin molecule to which the reacting groups are attached.

Dehydration and decarboxylation take place early in coalification, while demethanation begins only after the coal has already reached bituminous rank. The effect of decarboxylation is to reduce the percentage of oxygen, while demethanation reduces the percentage of hydrogen. Dehydration does both, and (together with demethanation) reduces the saturation of the carbon backbone (increasing the number of double bonds between carbon).

As carbonization proceeds, aliphatic compounds convert to aromatic compounds. Similarly, aromatic rings fuse into polyaromatic compounds (linked rings of carbon atoms). The structure increasingly resembles graphene, the structural element of graphite.

Chemical changes are accompanied by physical changes, such as decrease in average pore size.

=== Macerals ===
Macerals are coalified plant parts that retain the morphology and some properties of the original plant. In many coals, individual macerals can be identified visually. Some macerals include:

- vitrinite, derived from woody parts
- lipinite, derived from spores and algae
- inertite, derived from woody parts that had been burnt in prehistoric times
- huminite, a precursor to vitrinite.

In coalification huminite is replaced by vitreous (shiny) vitrinite. Maturation of bituminous coal is characterized by bitumenization, in which part of the coal is converted to bitumen, a hydrocarbon-rich gel. Maturation to anthracite is characterized by debitumenization (from demethanation) and the increasing tendency of the anthracite to break with a conchoidal fracture, similar to the way thick glass breaks.

=== Types ===
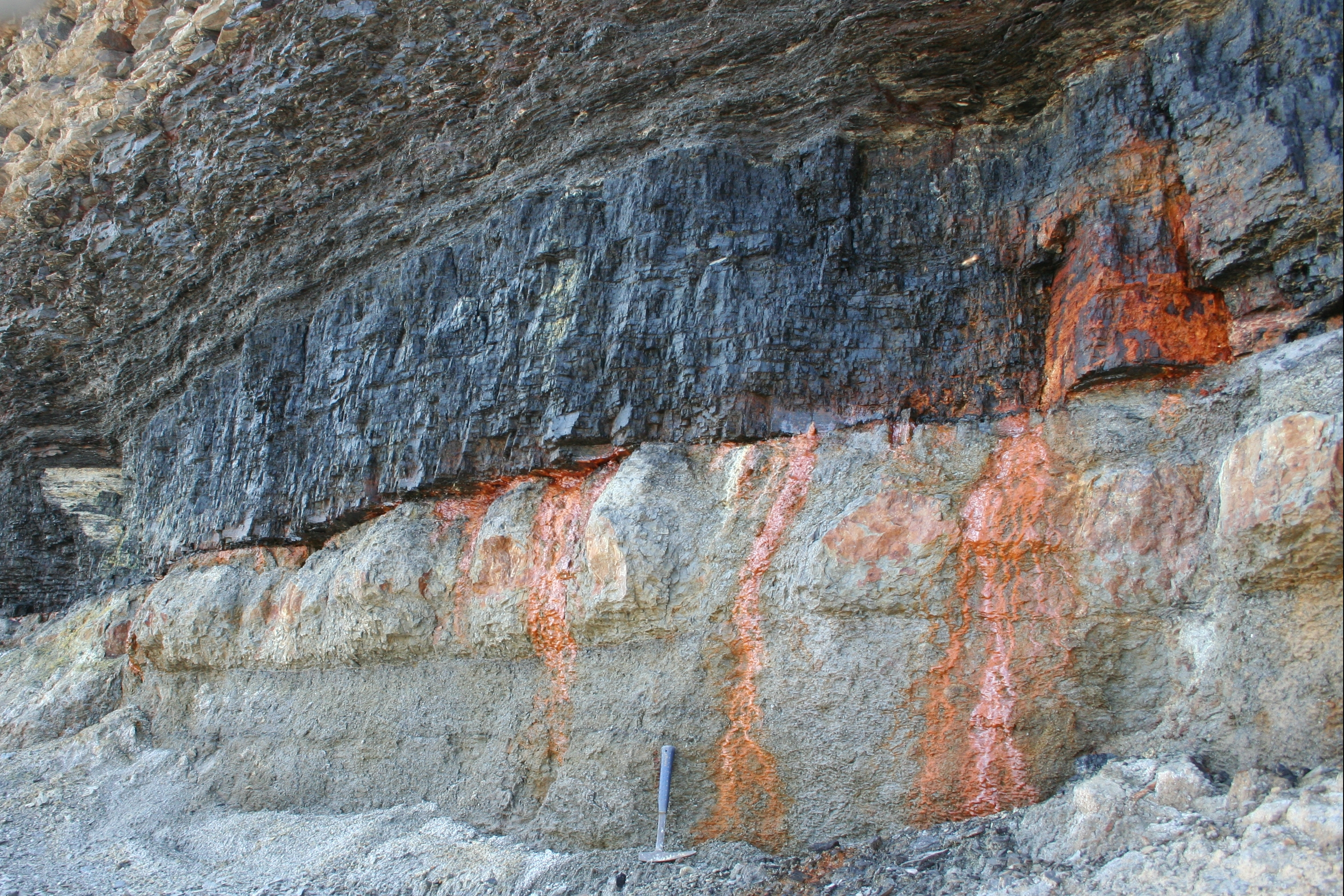
Coastal exposure of the Point Aconi Seam in Nova Scotia

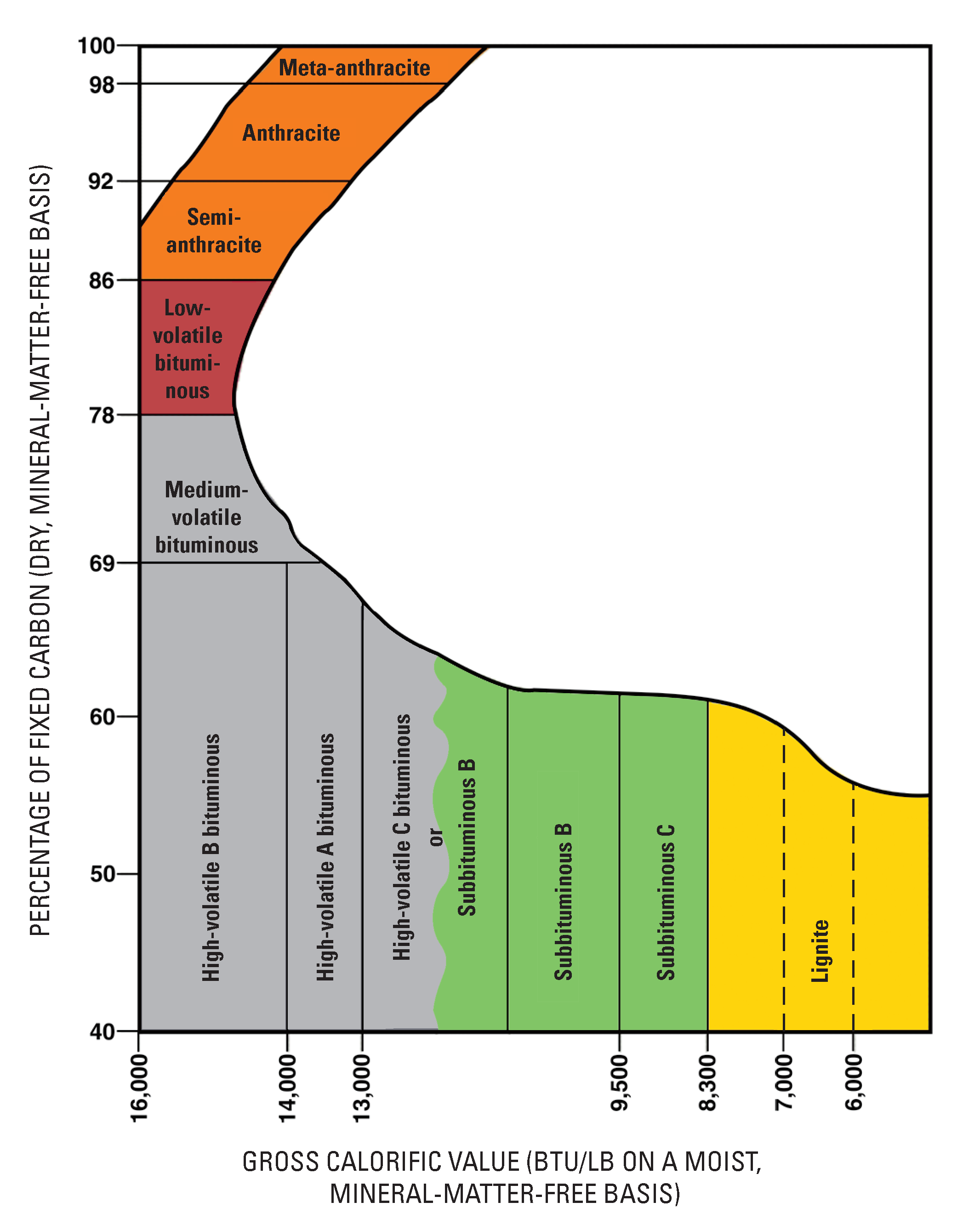
Coal ranking system used by the United States Geological Survey

As geological processes apply pressure to dead biotic material over time, under suitable conditions, its metamorphic grade or rank increases successively into:

- Peat, a precursor of coal
- Lignite, or brown coal, the lowest rank of coal, most harmful to health when burned, used almost exclusively as fuel for electric power generation
- Sub-bituminous coal, whose properties range between those of lignite and those of bituminous coal, is used primarily as fuel for steam-electric power generation.
- Bituminous coal, a dense sedimentary rock, usually black, but sometimes dark brown, often with well-defined bands of bright and dull material. It is used primarily as fuel in steam-electric power generation and to make coke. Known as steam coal in the UK, and historically used to raise steam in steam locomotives and ships
- Anthracite coal, the highest rank of coal, is a harder, glossy black coal used primarily for residential and commercial space heating.
- Graphite, a difficult to ignite coal that is used mostly in pencils, or in powdered form for lubrication.
- Cannel coal (sometimes called "candle coal"), a variety of fine-grained, high-rank coal with significant hydrogen content, that consists primarily of liptinite. It is related to boghead coal.

There are several international standards for coal. The classification of coal is generally based on the content of volatiles. However the most important distinction is between thermal coal (also known as steam coal), which is burnt to generate electricity via steam; and metallurgical coal (also known as coking coal), which is burnt at high temperature to make steel.

Hilt's law is a geological observation that (within a small area) the deeper the coal is found, the higher its rank (or grade). It applies if the thermal gradient is entirely vertical; however, metamorphism may cause lateral changes of rank, irrespective of depth. For example, some of the coal seams of the Madrid, New Mexico coal field were partially converted to anthracite by contact metamorphism from an igneous sill while the remainder of the seams remained as bituminous coal.

== History ==
The oldest intentional use of black coal was documented in Ostrava, Petřkovice, in a settlement from the older Stone Age on the top of Landek Hill. According to radiocarbon dating, the site falls within the period 25,000–23,000 years BC.

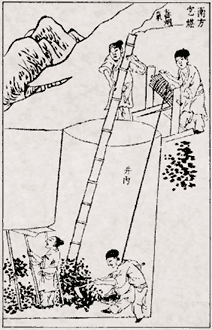
Chinese coal miners in an illustration of the Tiangong Kaiwu encyclopedia, published in 1637

In China, the earliest recognized use is from the Shenyang where by 4000 BC Neolithic inhabitants had begun carving ornaments from black lignite. Coal from the Fushun mine in northeastern China was used to smelt copper as early as 1000 BC. Marco Polo, the Italian who traveled to China in the 13th century, described coal as "black stones ... which burn like logs", and said coal was so plentiful, people could take three hot baths a week. In Europe, the earliest reference to the use of coal as fuel is from the geological treatise On Stones(c. 371–287 BC):

Outcrop coal was used in Britain during the Bronze Age (3000–2000 BC), where it formed part of funeral pyres. In Roman Britain, "the Romans were exploiting coals in all the major coalfields in England and Wales by the end of the second century AD". Coal from the Midlands was transported via the Car Dyke for use in drying grain. Coal cinders have been found in the hearths of villas and Roman forts, particularly in Northumberland, dated to around AD 400. In the west of England, contemporary writers described the wonder of a permanent brazier of coal on the altar of Minerva at Aquae Sulis (modern day Bath), although in fact easily accessible surface coal from what became the Somerset coalfield was in common use in quite lowly dwellings locally. Evidence of coal's use for iron-working in the city during the Roman period has been found. In Eschweiler, Rhineland, deposits of bituminous coal were used by the Romans for the smelting of iron ore.

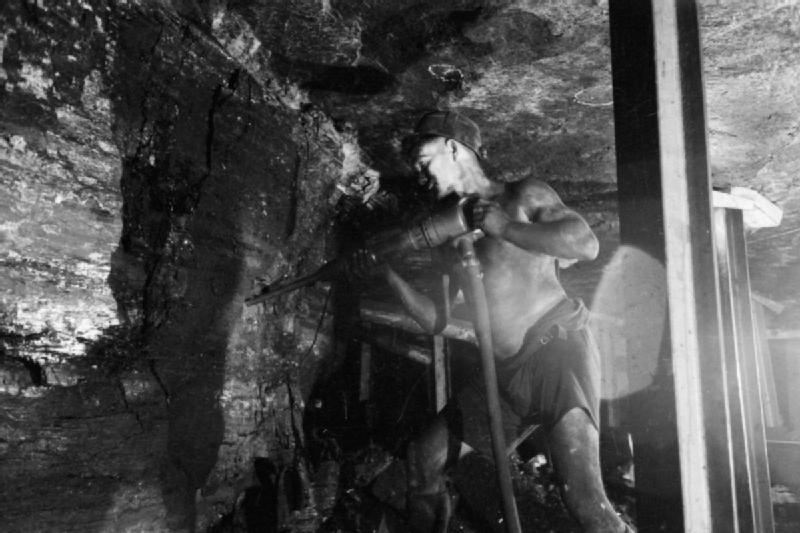
Coal miner in Britain, 1942

No evidence exists of coal being of great importance in Britain before about AD 1000, the High Middle Ages. Coal came to be referred to as "seacoal" in the 13th century; the wharf where the material arrived in London was known as Seacoal Lane, so identified in a charter of King Henry III granted in 1253. Initially, the name was given because much coal was found on the shore, having fallen from the exposed coal seams on cliffs above or washed out of underwater coal outcrops. In 1257–1259, coal from Newcastle upon Tyne was shipped to London for the smiths and lime-burners building Westminster Abbey. Coal continues to arrive on beaches around the world from both natural erosion of exposed coal seams and windswept spills from cargo ships. Many homes in such areas gather this coal as a significant, and sometimes primary, source of home heating fuel.

These easily accessible sources had largely become exhausted (or could not meet the growing demand) by the 13th century, when underground extraction by shaft mining or adits was developed. The alternative name was "pitcoal", because it came from mines.

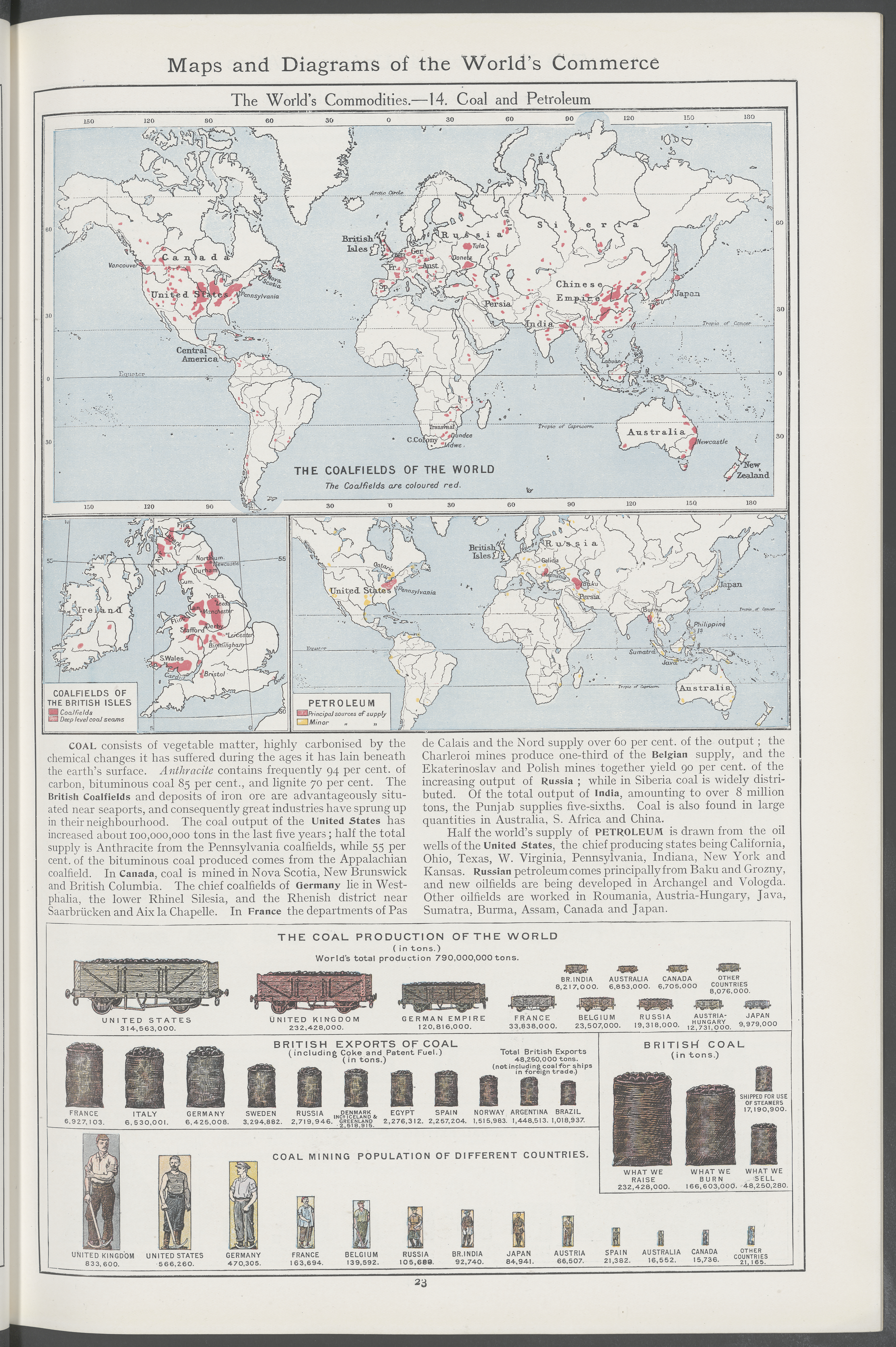
Coal production of the world in 1908 as presented by The Harmsworth atlas and Gazetter

Cooking and home heating with coal (in addition to firewood or instead of it) has been done in various times and places throughout human history, especially in times and places where ground-surface coal was available and firewood was scarce, but a widespread reliance on coal for home hearths probably never existed until such a switch in fuels happened in London in the late sixteenth and early seventeenth centuries. Historian Ruth Goodman has traced the socioeconomic effects of that switch and its later spread throughout Britain and suggested that its importance in shaping the industrial adoption of coal has been previously underappreciated.

The development of the Industrial Revolution led to the large-scale use of coal, as the steam engine took over from the water wheel. In 1700, five-sixths of the world's coal was mined in Britain. Britain would have run out of suitable sites for watermills by the 1830s if coal had not been available as a source of energy. In 1947 there were some 750,000 miners in Britain, but the last deep coal mine in the UK closed in 2015.

A grade between bituminous coal and anthracite was once known as "steam coal" as it was widely used as a fuel for steam locomotives. In this specialized use, it is sometimes known as "sea coal" in the United States. Small "steam coal", also called dry small steam nuts (DSSN), was used as a fuel for domestic water heating.

Coal played an important role in industry in the 19th and 20th century. The predecessor of the European Union, the European Coal and Steel Community, was based on the trading of this commodity.

== Composition ==
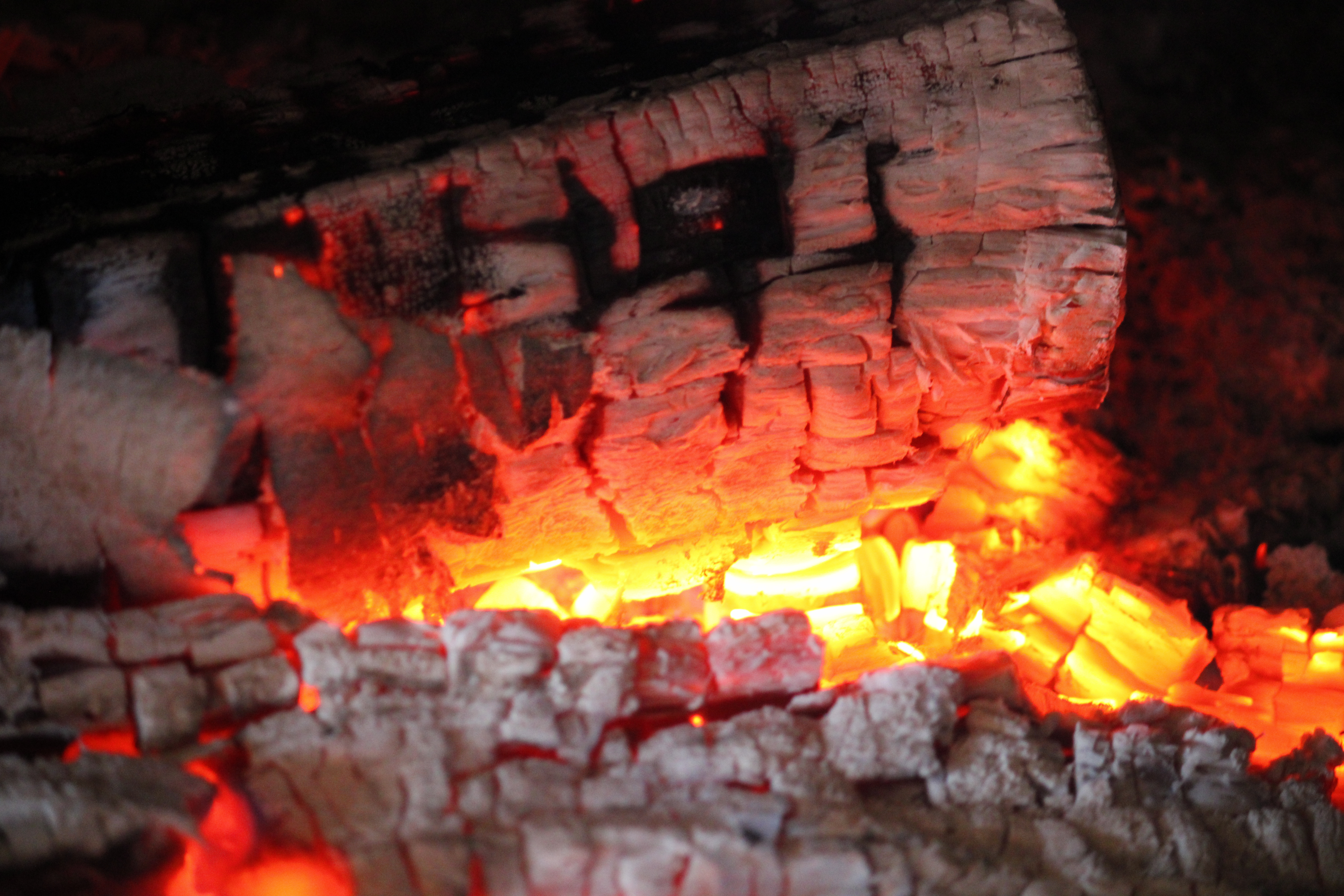
Firewood combusting into coal in a wood-burning stove, 2025

Coal is a mixture of diverse organic compounds and polymers. Several kinds exist, with variable dark colors and composition. Young coals (brown coal, lignite) are not completely black. The two main black coals are bituminous, which is more abundant, and anthracite. The type of coal with the highest percentage of carbon in its chemical composition is anthracite, followed by bituminous, then lignite, and finally brown coal. The fuel value of coal varies in the same order. Some anthracite deposits contain pure carbon in the form of graphite.

For bituminous coal, the elemental composition on a dry, ash-free basis is 84.4% carbon, 5.4% hydrogen, 6.7% oxygen, 1.7% nitrogen, and 1.8% sulfur by weight. This composition partly reflects the composition of the precursor plants. The second main fraction of coal is ash, an undesirable, noncombustable mixture of inorganic minerals. The composition of ash is often discussed in terms of oxides obtained after combustion in air:

Ash composition, weight percent
SiO_{2}	20–40
Al_{2}O_{3}	10–35
Fe_{2}O_{3}	5–35
CaO	1–20
MgO	0.3–4
TiO_{2}	0.5–2.5
Na_{2}O & K_{2}O	1–4
SO_{3}	0.1–12

Of particular interest is the sulfur content of coal, which can vary from less than 1% to as much as 4%. Most of the sulfur and most of the nitrogen is incorporated into the organic fraction in the form of organosulfur compounds and organonitrogen compounds. This sulfur and nitrogen are strongly bound within the hydrocarbon matrix. These elements are released as SO_{2} and NO_{x} upon combustion. They cannot be removed, economically at least, otherwise. Some coals contain inorganic sulfur, mainly in the form of iron pyrite (FeS_{2}). Being a dense mineral, iron pyrite can be removed from coal by mechanical means, e.g. by froth flotation. Some sulfate occurs in coal, especially weathered samples. It is not volatilized and can be removed by washing.

Minor components include:

Average content
Substance	Content
Mercury (Hg)	0.10±0.01 ppm
Arsenic (As)	1.4–71 ppm
Selenium (Se)	3 ppm

As minerals, Hg, As, and Se are not problematic for the environment, especially since they are only trace components. They become mobile (volatile or water-soluble), however, when these minerals are combusted.

== Uses ==
Most coal is used as fuel. 27.6% of world energy was supplied by coal in 2017 and Asia used almost three-quarters of it. Other large-scale applications also exist. The energy density of coal is roughly 24 megajoules per kilogram (approximately 6.7 kilowatt-hours per kg). For a coal power plant with a 40% efficiency, it takes an estimated 325 kg (717 lb) of coal to power a 100 W lightbulb for one year.

=== Electricity generation ===
Electricity from coal

In 2022, 68% of global coal use was used for electricity generation. The International Energy Agency (IEA) has estimated global coal demand to be 5,946 Megatonnes in 2024, and 5,964 Mt in 2025.

Coal burnt in coal power stations to generate electricity is called thermal coal. It is usually pulverized and then burned in a furnace with a boiler. The furnace heat converts boiler water to steam, which is then used to spin turbines which turn generators and produce electricity. The thermodynamic efficiency of this process varies between about 25% and 50% depending on the pre-combustion treatment, turbine technology (e.g. supercritical steam generator) and the age of the plant.

A few integrated gasification combined cycle (IGCC) power plants have been built, which burn coal more efficiently. Instead of pulverizing the coal and burning it directly as fuel in the steam-generating boiler, the coal is gasified to create syngas, which is burned in a gas turbine to produce electricity (just like natural gas is burned in a turbine). Hot exhaust gases from the turbine are used to raise steam in a heat recovery steam generator which powers a supplemental steam turbine. The overall plant efficiency when used to provide combined heat and power can reach as much as 94%. IGCC power plants emit less local pollution than conventional pulverized coal-fueled plants. Other ways to use coal are as coal-water slurry fuel (CWS), which was developed in the Soviet Union, or in an MHD topping cycle. However these are not widely used due to lack of profit.

In 2017 38% of the world's electricity came from coal, the same percentage as 30 years previously. In 2018 global installed capacity was 2 TW (of which 1 TW was in China) which was 30% of total electricity generation capacity. The most dependent major country was South Africa, with over 80% of its electricity generated by coal; but in 2020 China alone generated more than half of the world's coal-generated electricity. Efforts around the world to reduce the use of coal have led many regions to switch to natural gas and renewable energy. In 2018 coal-fired power station capacity factor averaged 51%, that is they operated for about half their available operating hours.

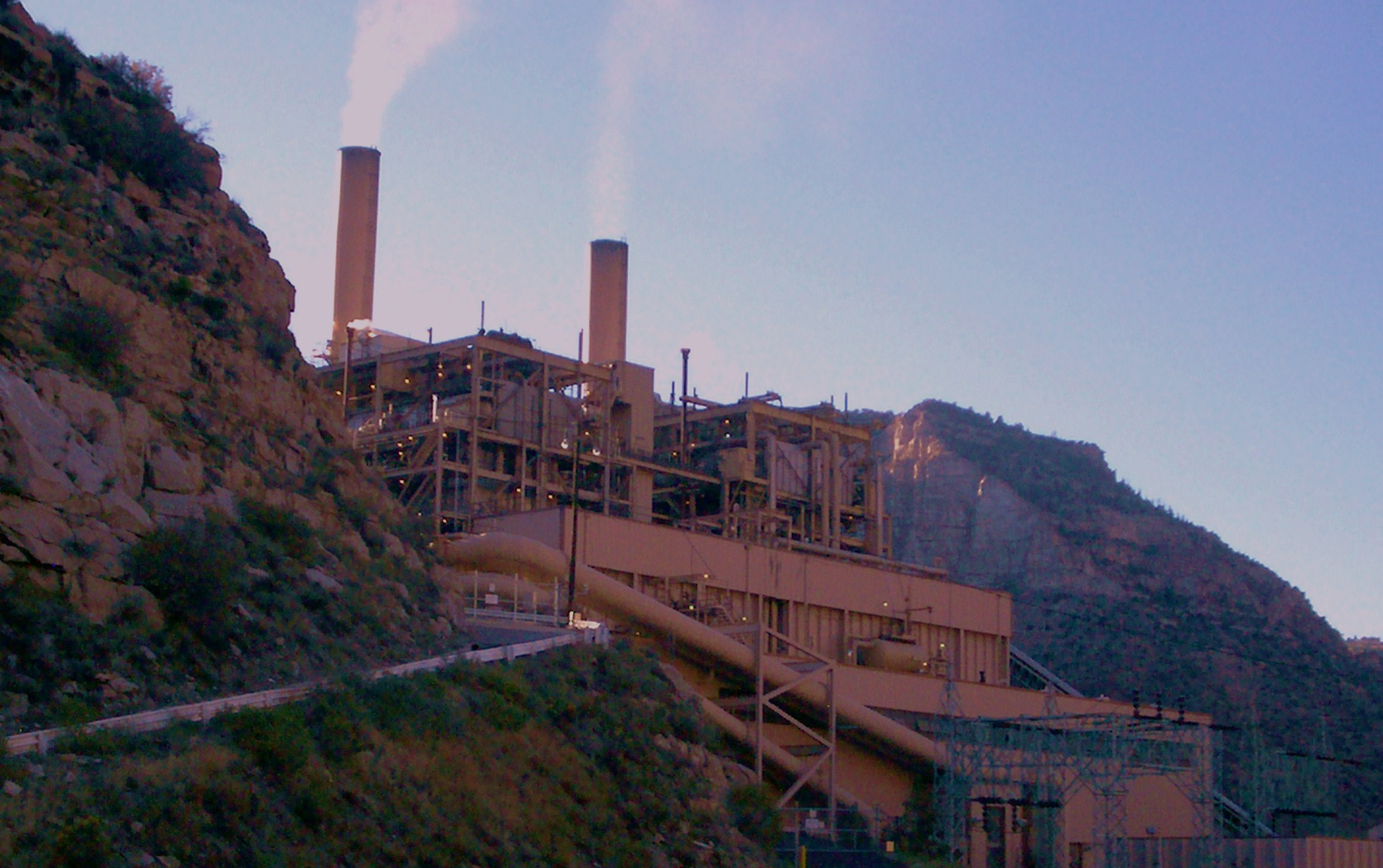
Castle Gate Power Plant near Helper, Utah, US

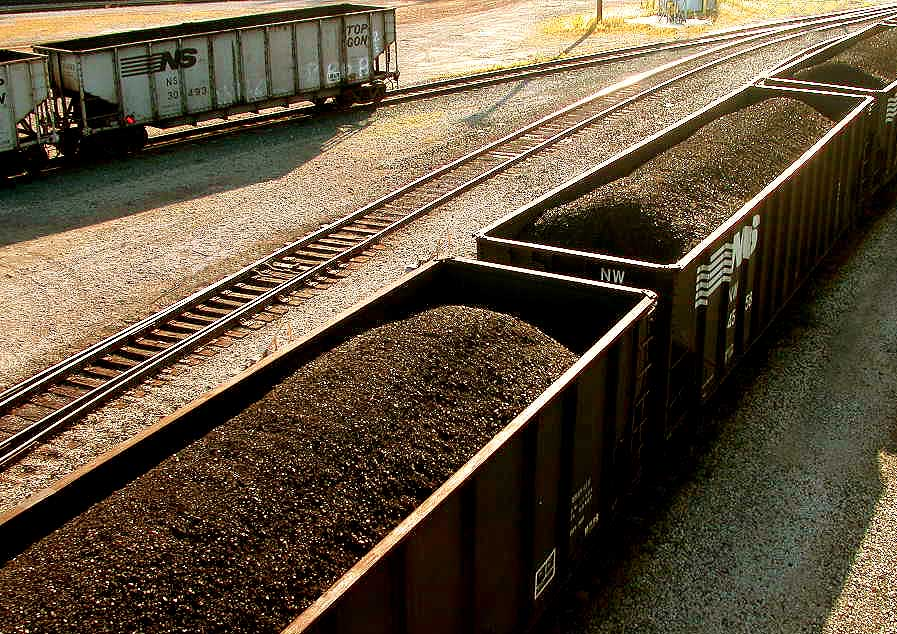
Coal rail cars

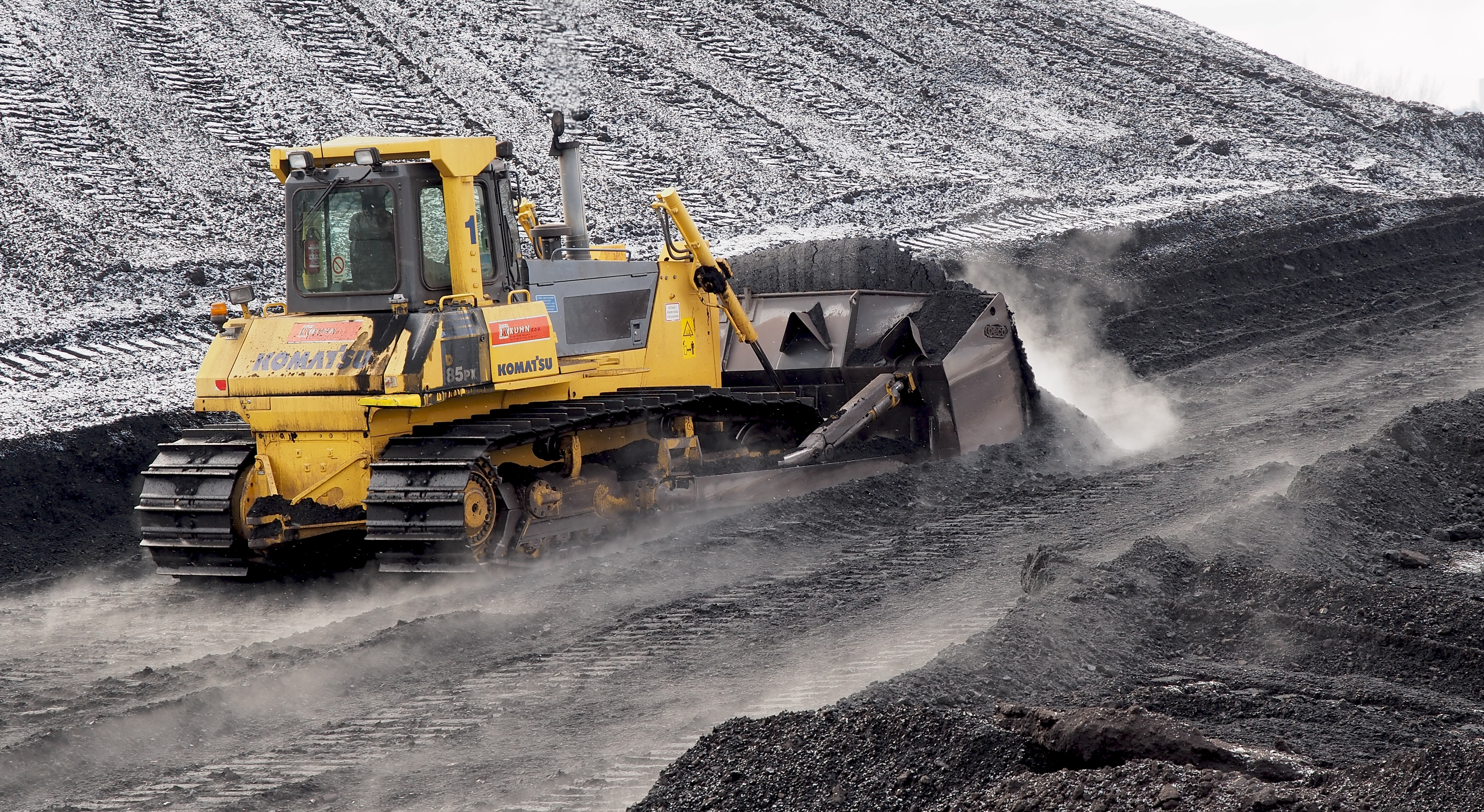
Bulldozer pushing coal in Ljubljana Power Station, Slovenia

=== Coke ===
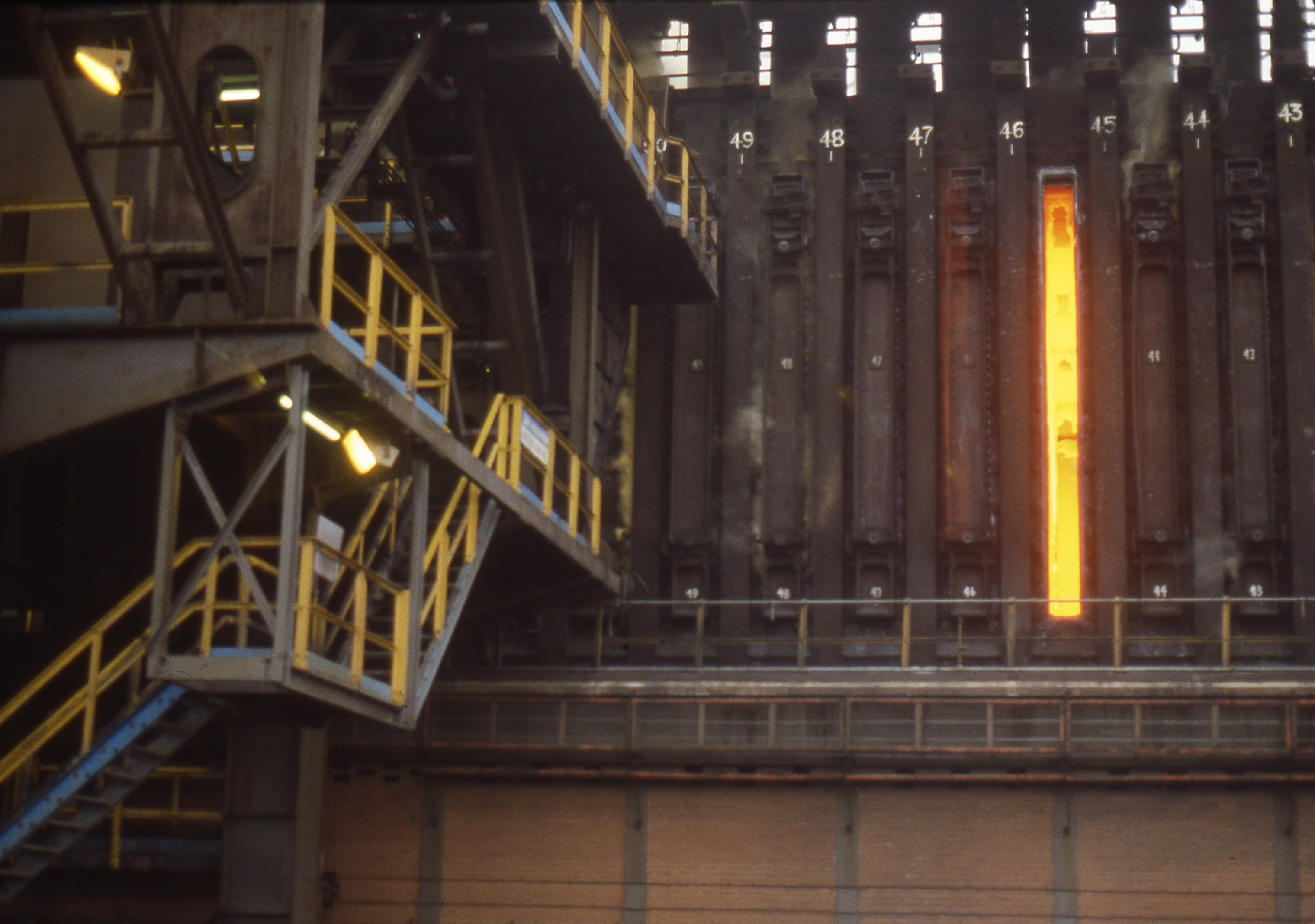
Coke oven at a smokeless fuel plant in Wales, United Kingdom

Coke is a solid carbonaceous residue that is used in manufacturing steel and other iron-containing products. Coke is made when metallurgical coal (also known as coking coal) is baked in an oven without oxygen at temperatures as high as 1,000 °C, driving off the volatile constituents and fusing together the fixed carbon and residual ash. Metallurgical coke is used as a fuel and as a reducing agent in smelting iron ore in a blast furnace. The carbon monoxide produced by its combustion reduces hematite (an iron oxide) to iron.

2 Fe_{2}O_{3} + 6 CO → 4 Fe + 6 CO_{2}

Pig iron, which is too rich in dissolved carbon, is also produced.

The coke must be strong enough to resist the weight of overburden in the blast furnace, which is why coking coal is so important in making steel using the conventional route. Coke from coal is grey, hard, and porous and has a heating value of 29.6 MJ/kg. Some coke-making processes produce byproducts, including coal tar, ammonia, light oils, and coal gas.

Petroleum coke (petcoke) is the solid residue obtained in oil refining, which resembles coke but contains too many impurities to be useful in metallurgical applications.

=== Production of chemicals ===
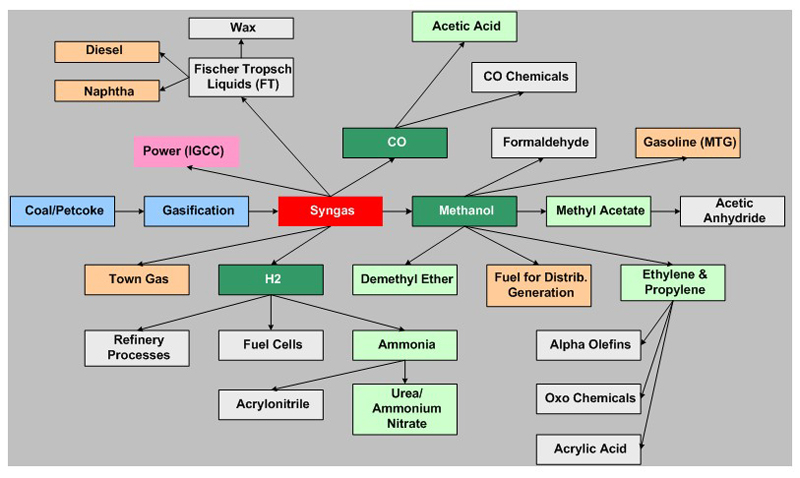
Production of chemicals from coal

Chemicals have been produced from coal since the 1940s. (Note: during WW II, the Nazi regime used Coal liquefaction to produce fuel for the Wehrmacht.) Coal can be used as a feedstock in the production of a wide range of chemical fertilizers and other chemical products. The main route to these products was coal gasification to produce syngas. Primary chemicals that are produced directly from the syngas include methanol, hydrogen, and carbon monoxide, which are the chemical building blocks from which a whole spectrum of derivative chemicals are manufactured, including olefins, acetic acid, formaldehyde, ammonia, urea, and others. The versatility of syngas as a precursor to primary chemicals and high-value derivative products provides the option of using coal to produce a wide range of commodities. In the 21st century, the use of coalbed methane has become more important.

Because the slate of chemical products that can be made via coal gasification can in general also use feedstocks derived from natural gas and petroleum, the chemical industry tends to use whatever feedstocks are most cost-effective. Therefore, interest in using coal tended to increase for higher oil and natural gas prices and during periods of high global economic growth that might have strained oil and gas production.

Coal to chemical processes require substantial quantities of water. Much coal to chemical production is in China where coal dependent provinces such as Shanxi are struggling to control its pollution.

=== Liquefaction ===
Coal can be converted directly into synthetic fuels equivalent to gasoline or diesel by hydrogenation or carbonization. Coal liquefaction emits more carbon dioxide than liquid fuel production from crude oil. Mixing in biomass and using carbon capture and storage (CCS) would emit slightly less than the oil process but at a high cost. State owned China Energy Investment runs a coal liquefaction plant and plans to build 2 more.

Coal liquefaction may also refer to the cargo hazard when shipping coal.

=== Gasification ===
Coal gasification, as part of an integrated gasification combined cycle (IGCC) coal-fired power station, is used to produce syngas, a mixture of carbon monoxide (CO) and hydrogen (H_{2}) gas to fire gas turbines to produce electricity. Syngas can also be converted into transportation fuels, such as gasoline and diesel, through the Fischer–Tropsch process; alternatively, syngas can be converted into methanol, which can be blended into fuel directly or converted to gasoline via the methanol to gasoline process. Gasification combined with Fischer–Tropsch technology was used by the Sasol chemical company of South Africa to make chemicals and motor vehicle fuels from coal.

During gasification, the coal is mixed with oxygen and steam while also being heated and pressurized. During the reaction, oxygen and water molecules oxidize the coal into carbon monoxide (CO), while also releasing hydrogen gas (H_{2}). This used to be done in underground coal mines, and also to make town gas, which was piped to customers to burn for illumination, heating, and cooking.

3C (as Coal) + O_{2} + H_{2}O → H_{2} + 3CO

If the refiner wants to produce gasoline, the syngas is routed into a Fischer–Tropsch reaction. This is known as indirect coal liquefaction. If hydrogen is the desired end-product, however, the syngas is fed into the water gas shift reaction, where more hydrogen is liberated:

CO + H_{2}O → CO_{2} + H_{2}

== Coal industry ==
=== Mining ===
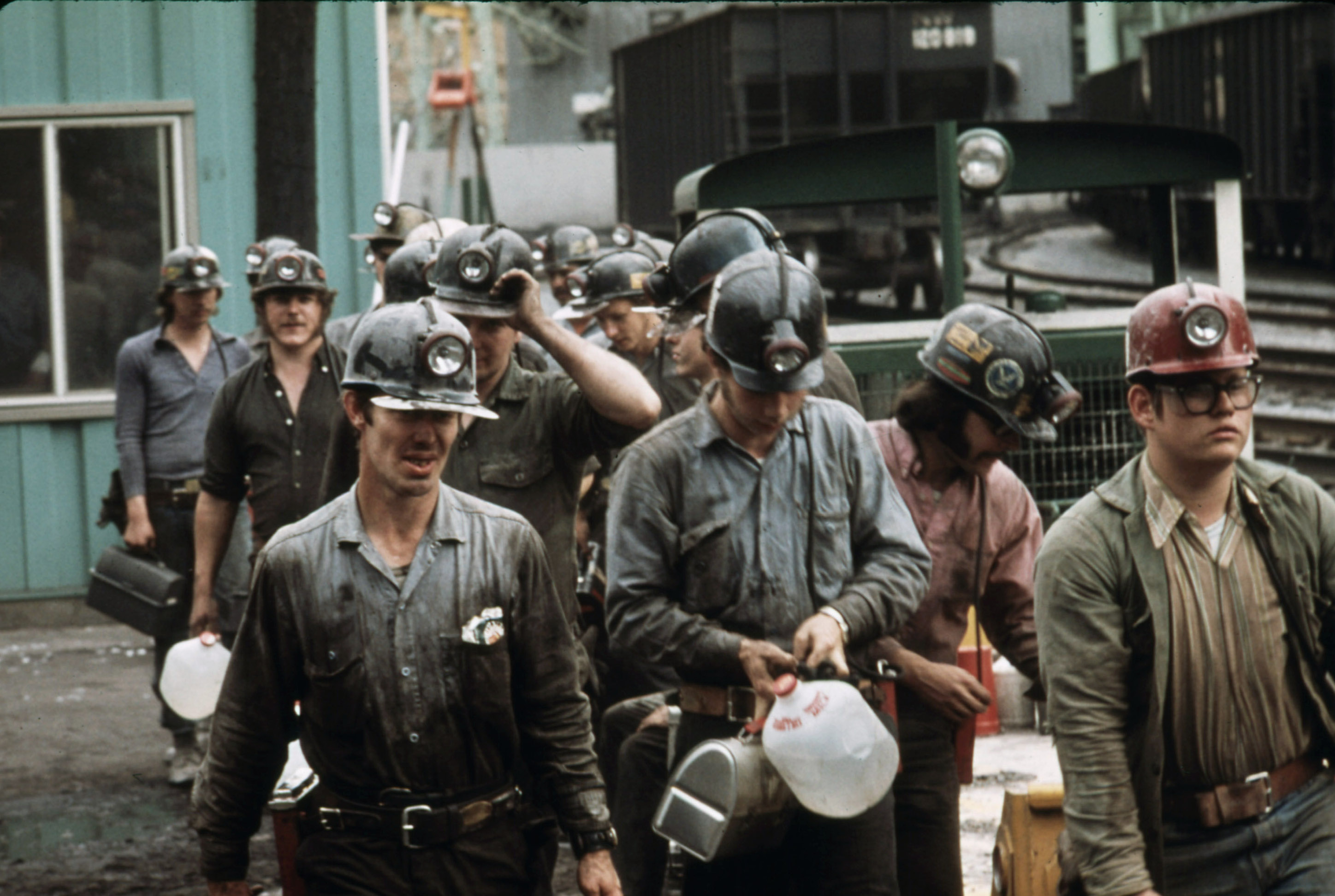
Coal miners in the Appalachia region in 1974

About 8,000 Mt of coal are produced annually, about 90% of which is hard coal and 10% lignite. As of 2018 just over half is from underground mines. The coal mining industry employs almost 2.7 million workers. More accidents occur during underground mining than surface mining. Not all countries publish mining accident statistics so worldwide figures are uncertain, but it is thought that most deaths occur in coal mining accidents in China: in 2017 there were 375 coal mining related deaths in China. Most coal mined is thermal coal (also called steam coal as it is used to make steam to generate electricity) but metallurgical coal (also called "metcoal" or "coking coal" as it is used to make coke to make iron) accounts for 10% to 15% of global coal use.

=== As a traded commodity ===
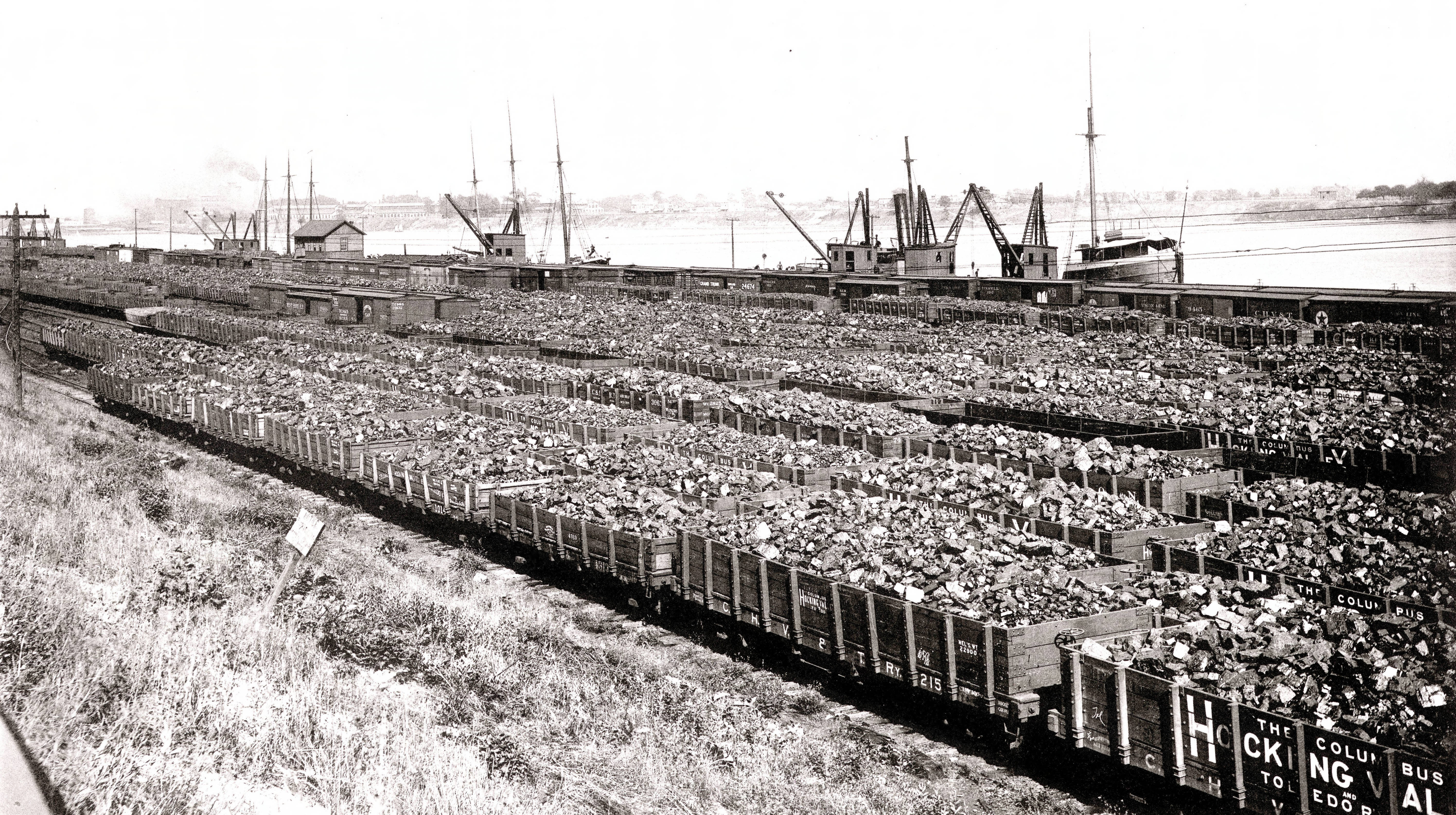
Extensive coal docks seen in Toledo, Ohio, 1895

China mines almost half the world's coal, followed by India with about a tenth. At 471 Mt and a 34% share of global exports, Indonesia was the largest exporter by volume in 2022, followed by Australia with 344 Mt and Russia with 224 Mt. Other major exporters of coal are the United States, South Africa, Colombia, and Canada. In 2022, China, India, and Japan were the biggest importers of coal, importing 301, 228, and 184 Mt respectively. Russia is increasingly orienting its coal exports from Europe to Asia as Europe transitions to renewable energy and subjects Russia to sanctions over its invasion of Ukraine.

The price of metallurgical coal is volatile and much higher than the price of thermal coal because metallurgical coal must be lower in sulfur and requires more cleaning. Coal futures contracts provide coal producers and the electric power industry an important tool for hedging and risk management.

In some countries, new onshore wind or solar generation already costs less than coal power from existing plants. However, for China this is forecast for the early 2020s and for southeast Asia not until the late 2020s. In India, building new plants is uneconomic and, despite being subsidized, existing plants are losing market share to renewables.

In many countries in the Global North, there is a move away from the use of coal and former mine sites are being used as a tourist attraction.

=== Market trends ===
Coal production by region

Coal production

In 2022, China used 4520 Mt of coal, comprising more than half of global coal consumption. India, the European Union, and the United States, were the next largest consumers of coal, using 1162, 461, and 455 Mt respectively. Over the past decade, China has almost always accounted for the lion's share of the global growth in coal demand. Therefore, international market trends depend on Chinese energy policy.

Although the government effort to reduce air pollution in China means that the global long-term trend is to burn less coal, the short and medium term trends may differ, in part due to Chinese financing of new coal-fired power plants in other countries.

Coal phase out timeline

Preliminary analysis by International Energy Agency (IEA) indicates that global coal exports reached an all-time high in 2023. Through to 2026, the IEA expects global coal trade to decline by about 12%, driven by growing domestic production in coal-intensive economies such as China and India and coal phase-out plans elsewhere, such as in Europe. India's consumption of coal is greater than Europe and North America combined. While thermal coal exports are expected to decline by about 16% by 2026, exports of metallurgical coal are expected to slightly increase by almost 2%.

== Damage to human health ==
Deaths caused as a result of fossil fuel use, especially coal (areas of rectangles in chart) greatly exceed those resulting from production of renewable energy (rectangles barely visible in chart).

The use of coal as fuel causes health problems and deaths. The mining and processing of coal causes air and water pollution. Coal-powered plants emit nitrogen oxides, sulfur dioxide, particulate pollution, and heavy metals, which adversely affect human health. Coalbed methane extraction is important to avoid mining accidents.

The deadly London smog was caused primarily by the heavy use of coal. Globally coal is estimated to cause 800,000 premature deaths every year, mostly in India and China.

Burning coal is a major contributor to sulfur dioxide emissions, which creates PM2.5 particulates, the most dangerous form of air pollution.

Coal smokestack emissions cause asthma, strokes, reduced intelligence, artery blockages, heart attacks, congestive heart failure, cardiac arrhythmias, mercury poisoning, arterial occlusion, and lung cancer.

Annual health costs in Europe from use of coal to generate electricity are estimated at up to €43 billion.

In China, early deaths due to air pollution coal plants have been estimated at 200 per GW-year, however they may be higher around power plants where scrubbers are not used or lower if they are far from cities. Improvements to China's air quality and human health would grow with more stringent climate policies, mainly because the country's energy is so heavily reliant on coal. And there would be a net economic benefit.

A 2017 study in the Economic Journal found that for Britain during the period 1851–1860, "a one standard deviation increase in coal use raised infant mortality by 6–8% and that industrial coal use explains roughly one-third of the urban mortality penalty observed during this period."

Breathing in coal dust causes coalworker's pneumoconiosis or "black lung", so called because the coal dust literally turns the lungs black. In the US alone, it is estimated that 1,500 former employees of the coal industry die every year from the effects of breathing in coal mine dust.

Huge amounts of coal ash and other waste is produced annually. Use of coal generates hundreds of millions of tons of ash and other waste products every year. These include fly ash, bottom ash, and flue-gas desulfurization sludge, that contain mercury, uranium, thorium, arsenic, and other heavy metals, along with non-metals such as selenium.

Around 10% of coal is ash. Coal ash is hazardous and toxic to human beings and some other living things. Coal ash contains the radioactive elements uranium and thorium. Coal ash and other solid combustion byproducts are stored locally and escape in various ways that expose those living near coal plants to radiation and environmental toxins. As such, the United Nations Scientific Committee on the Effects of Atomic Radiation estimates coal-powered plants exude much greater amounts of radioactivity than nuclear power plants.

== Damage to the environment ==
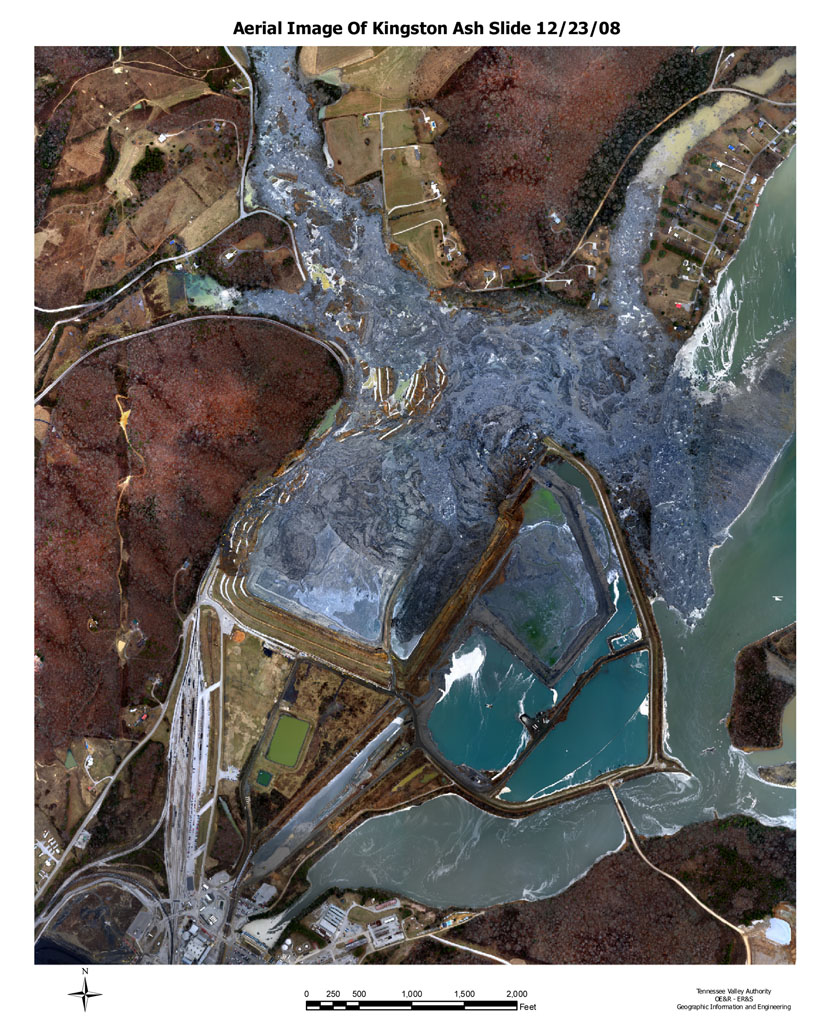
Aerial photograph of the site of the Kingston Fossil Plant coal fly ash slurry spill taken the day after the event

Coal mining, coal combustion wastes, and flue gas are causing major environmental damage.

Water systems are affected by coal mining. For example, the mining of coal affects groundwater and water table levels and acidity. Spills of fly ash, such as the Kingston Fossil Plant coal fly ash slurry spill, can also contaminate land and waterways, and destroy homes. Power stations that burn coal also consume large quantities of water. This can affect the flows of rivers, and has consequential impacts on other land uses. In areas of water scarcity, such as the Thar Desert in Pakistan, coal mining and coal power plants contribute to the depletion of water resources.

One of the earliest known impacts of coal on the water cycle was acid rain. In 2014, approximately 100 Tg/S of sulfur dioxide (SO_{2}) was released, over half of which was from burning coal. After release, the sulfur dioxide is oxidized to H_{2}SO_{4} which scatters solar radiation, hence its increase in the atmosphere exerts a cooling effect on the climate. This beneficially masks some of the warming caused by increased greenhouse gases. However, the sulfur is precipitated out of the atmosphere as acid rain in a matter of weeks, whereas carbon dioxide remains in the atmosphere for hundreds of years. Release of SO_{2} also contributes to the widespread acidification of ecosystems.

Disused coal mines can also cause issues. Subsidence can occur above tunnels, causing damage to infrastructure or cropland. Coal mining can also cause long lasting fires, and it has been estimated that thousands of coal seam fires are burning at any given time. For example, Brennender Berg has been burning since 1668, and is still burning in the 21st century.

The production of coke from coal produces ammonia, coal tar, and gaseous compounds as byproducts which if discharged to land, air or waterways can pollute the environment. The Whyalla steelworks is one example of a coke producing facility where liquid ammonia was discharged to the marine environment.

=== Climate change ===
The warming influence (called radiative forcing) of long-lived greenhouse gases has nearly doubled in 40 years, with carbon dioxide being the dominant driver of global warming.

The largest and most long-term effect of coal use is the release of carbon dioxide, a greenhouse gas that causes climate change. Coal-fired power plants were the single largest contributor to the growth in global CO_{2} emissions in 2018, 40% of the total fossil fuel emissions, and more than a quarter of total emissions. (Note: 14.4 gigatonnes coal/50 gigatonnes total) Coal mining can emit methane, another greenhouse gas.

In 2016 world gross carbon dioxide emissions from coal usage were 14.5 gigatonnes. For every megawatt-hour generated, coal-fired electric power generation emits around a tonne of carbon dioxide, which is double the approximately 500 kg of carbon dioxide released by a natural gas-fired electric plant. The emission intensity of coal varies with type and generator technology and exceeds 1200 g per kWh in some countries. In 2013, the head of the UN climate agency advised that most of the world's coal reserves should be left in the ground to avoid catastrophic global warming. To keep global warming below 1.5 °C or 2 °C hundreds, or possibly thousands, of coal-fired power plants will need to be retired early.

=== Underground fires ===
Thousands of coal fires are burning around the world. Those burning underground can be difficult to locate and many cannot be extinguished. Fires can cause the ground above to subside, their combustion gases are dangerous to life, and breaking out to the surface can initiate surface wildfires. Coal seams can be set on fire by spontaneous combustion or contact with a mine fire or surface fire. Lightning strikes are an important source of ignition. The coal continues to burn slowly back into the seam until oxygen (air) can no longer reach the flame front. A grass fire in a coal area can set dozens of coal seams on fire. Coal fires in China burn an estimated 120 million tons of coal a year, emitting 360 million metric tons of CO_{2}, amounting to 2–3% of the annual worldwide production of CO_{2} from fossil fuels.

== Pollution mitigation and carbon capture ==
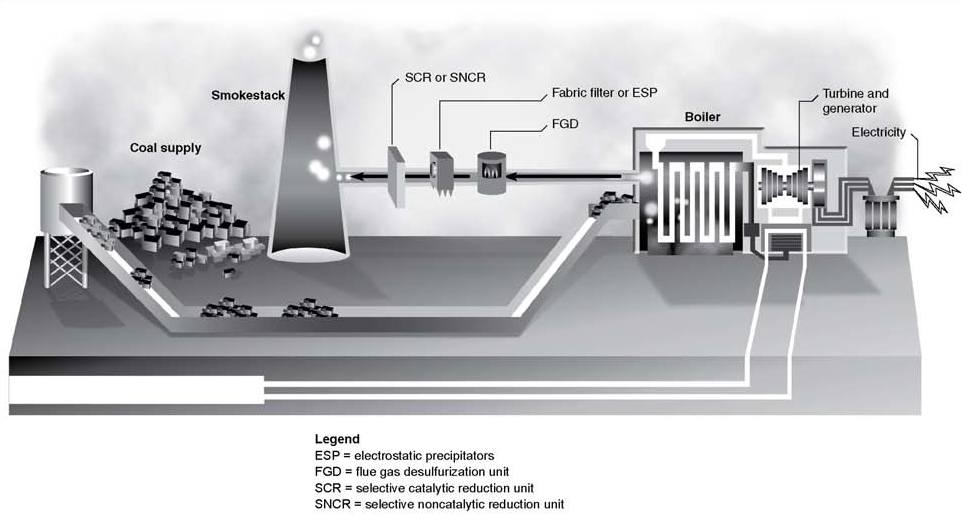
Emissions controls at a coal fired power plant

Systems and technologies exist to mitigate the health and environmental impact of burning coal for energy.

=== Precombustion treatment ===
Refined coal is the product of a coal-upgrading technology that removes moisture and certain pollutants from lower-rank coals such as sub-bituminous and lignite (brown) coals. It is one form of several precombustion treatments and processes for coal that alter coal's characteristics before it is burned. Thermal efficiency improvements are achievable by improved pre-drying (especially relevant with high-moisture fuel such as lignite or biomass). The goals of precombustion coal technologies are to increase efficiency and reduce emissions when the coal is burned. Precombustion technology can sometimes be used as a supplement to postcombustion technologies to control emissions from coal-fueled boilers.

=== Post combustion approaches ===
Post combustion approaches to mitigate pollution include flue-gas desulfurization, selective catalytic reduction, electrostatic precipitators, and fly ash reduction.

=== Carbon capture and storage ===
Carbon capture and storage (CCS) can be used to capture carbon dioxide from the flue gas of coal power plants and bury it securely in an underground reservoir. Between 1972 and 2017, plans were made to add CCS to enough coal and gas power plants to sequester 161 million tonnes of CO_{2} per year, but by 2021 98% of these plans had failed. Cost, the absence of measures to address long-term liability for stored CO_{2}, and limited social acceptability have all contributed to project cancellations. As of 2024, CCS is in operation at only four coal power plants and one gas power plant worldwide.

=== "Clean coal" and "abated coal" ===
Coal industry groups promote the idea of "clean coal". In one video by the American Coalition for Clean Coal Electricity, coal lumps are portrayed as characters singing carols with names like "Frosty the Coalman."

Since the mid-1980s, the term "clean coal" has been widely used with various meanings. Initially, "clean coal technology" referred to scrubbers and catalytic converters that reduced the pollutants that cause acid rain. The scope then expanded to include reduction of other pollutants such as mercury. Recently, the term has come to encompass the use of carbon capture and storage to reduce greenhouse gas emissions.

In political discourse, the term has been erroneously used to imply that coal itself can be clean. For instance, it has been suggested that "clean coal" can be produced and exported. Even with scrubbers and some CCS, coal still has a fairly high environmental impact.

In discussions on greenhouse gas emissions, another common term is "abatement" of coal use. In the 2023 United Nations Climate Change Conference, an agreement was reached to phase down unabated coal use. Since the term abated was not defined, the agreement was criticized for being open to abuse. Without a clear definition, is possible for fossil fuel use to be called "abated" if it uses CCS only in a minimal fashion, such as capturing only 30% of the emissions from a plant.

The Intergovernmental Panel on Climate Change (IPCC) considers fossil fuels to be unabated if they are "produced and used without interventions that substantially reduce the amount of greenhouse gases emitted throughout the life-cycle; for example, capturing 90% or more from power plants."

== Economics ==
In 2018, US$80 billion was invested in coal supply but almost all for sustaining production levels rather than opening new mines. In the long term coal and oil could cost the world trillions of dollars per year. Coal alone may cost Australia billions, whereas costs to some smaller companies or cities could be on the scale of millions of dollars. The economies most damaged by coal (via climate change) may be India and the US as they are the countries with the highest social cost of carbon. Bank loans to finance coal are a risk to the Indian economy.

China is the largest producer of coal in the world. It is the world's largest energy consumer, and coal in China supplies 60% of its primary energy. However two fifths of China's coal power stations are estimated to be loss-making.

Air pollution from coal storage and handling costs the US almost 200 dollars for every extra ton stored, due to PM2.5. Coal pollution costs the European Union €43 billion each year. Measures to cut air pollution benefit individuals financially and the economies of countries such as China.

=== Subsidies ===
Subsidies for coal in 2021 have been estimated at US$19 billion, not including electricity subsidies, and are expected to rise in 2022. As of 2019 G20 countries provide at least US$63.9 billion of government support per year for the production of coal, including coal-fired power: many subsidies are impossible to quantify but they include US$27.6 billion in domestic and international public finance, US$15.4 billion in fiscal support, and US$20.9 billion in state-owned enterprise (SOE) investments per year. In Indonesia, coal power is subsidized through a ceiling on the price that coal producers can charge from domestic consumers. At the same time, the producers are obliged to provide specific amounts of coal to domestic consumers. This ensures that domestic consumers get coal at a discounted price and the producers lose money that they could otherwise have earned from selling the coal on the international market.

In the EU state aid to new coal-fired plants is banned from 2020, and to existing coal-fired plants from 2025. As of 2018, government funding for new coal power plants was supplied by Exim Bank of China, the Japan Bank for International Cooperation and Indian public sector banks. Coal in Kazakhstan was the main recipient of coal consumption subsidies totalling US$2 billion in 2017. Coal in Turkey benefited from substantial subsidies in 2021.

=== Stranded assets ===
Some coal-fired power stations could become stranded assets, for example China Energy Investment, the world's largest power company, risks losing half its capital. However, state-owned electricity utilities such as Eskom in South Africa, Perusahaan Listrik Negara in Indonesia, Sarawak Energy in Malaysia, Taipower in Taiwan, EGAT in Thailand, Vietnam Electricity and EÜAŞ in Turkey are building or planning new plants. As of 2021 this may be helping to cause a carbon bubble which could cause financial instability if it bursts.

== Politics ==
Countries building or financing new coal-fired power stations, such as China, India, Indonesia, Vietnam, Turkey and Bangladesh, face mounting international criticism for obstructing the aims of the Paris Agreement. In 2019, the Pacific Island nations (in particular Vanuatu and Fiji) criticized Australia for failing to cut their emissions at a faster rate than they were, citing concerns about coastal inundation and erosion. In May 2021, the G7 members agreed to end new direct government support for international coal power generation.

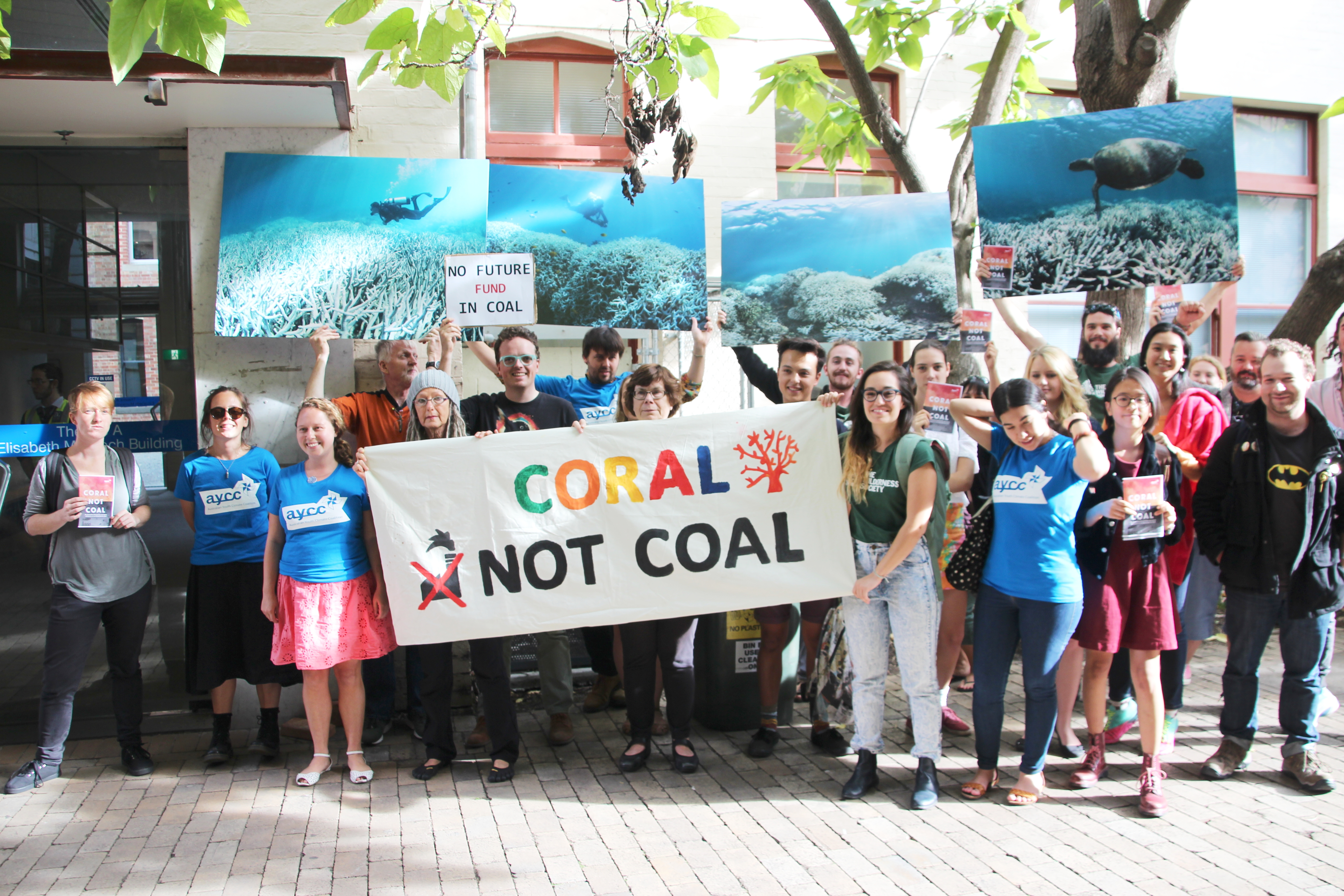
Protesting against damage to the Great Barrier Reef caused by climate change in Australia

== Cultural usage ==
Coal is the official state mineral of Kentucky, and the official state rock of Utah and West Virginia. These US states have a historic link to coal mining.

Some cultures hold that children who misbehave will receive only a lump of coal from Santa Claus for Christmas in their stockings instead of presents.

It is also customary and considered lucky in Scotland to give coal as a gift on New Year's Day. This occurs as part of first-footing and represents warmth for the year to come.

== See also ==
- Biochar – Lightweight black residue, made of carbon and ashes, after pyrolysis of biomass
- Carbochemistry – Branch of chemistry
- Coal analysis – Measurement of properties of coal
- Coal blending – Mixing of mined coal
- Coal homogenization – Process of mixing coal to reduce variance
- Coal measures – Coal-bearing geological strata (stratigraphic unit)
- Health and environmental impact of the coal industry
- Fluidized bed combustion – Technology used to burn solid fuels
- Fossil fuel phase-out – Gradual reduction of the use and production of fossil fuels
- Gytta – Type of fine-grained sedimentary mud
- Coal-mining region – Basin with coal deposits
- Mountaintop removal mining – Type of surface mining
- Subcoal – Coal substitute made from recycled waste
- The Coal Question – Book by William Stanley Jevons
- Tonstein – Type of sedimentary rock
- FutureCoal – UK-based Pro-coal lobbying organization
- Épinac coal mine
