= Stockpile =

Pile or storage location for bulk materials

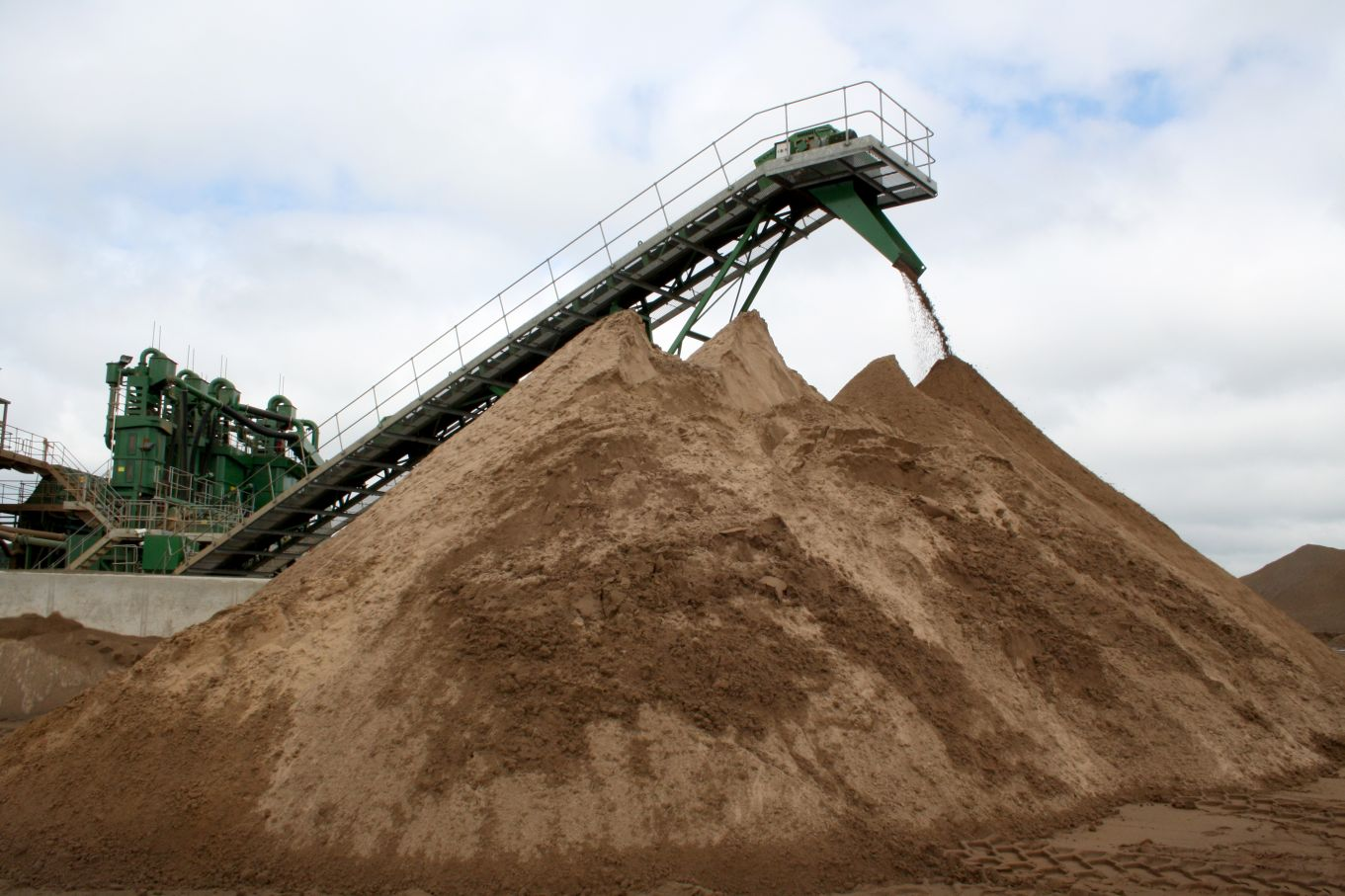
Sand stockpile

A stockpile is a pile or storage location for dirt, forming part of the mud bricks.

Stockpiles are used in many different areas, such as in a port, refinery or manufacturing facility. The stockpile is normally created by a stacker. A reclaimer is used to recover the material. Stockpiles are normally stacked in stockyards in refineries, ports and mine sites.

A simple stockpile is formed by machinery dumping coal into a pile, either from dump trucks, pushed into heaps with bulldozers or from conveyor booms. More controlled stockpiles are formed using stackers to form piles along the length of a conveyor, and reclaimers to retrieve the coal when required for product loading, etc.

Individuals may also choose to stockpile certain commodities (e.g. food, medical supplies), that they fear may not be available to purchase in the future. For example, in March 2019, one in ten British shoppers were reported to be stockpiling food prior to Brexit.

In the construction field stockpile volume measurement is a monthly work program. We can calculate volume of a stockpile manually or by using different types of software. Calculating the volume of a stockpile manually does not require any software. Software used to calculate stockpile volumes can either be proprietary, such as Microsoft Excel and Autocad, or Libre, such as Libre Office Calc and OpenSCAD

== See also ==
- Nuclear stockpile
- Coal preparation plant
