= Reclaimer =

Machine used in bulk material handling

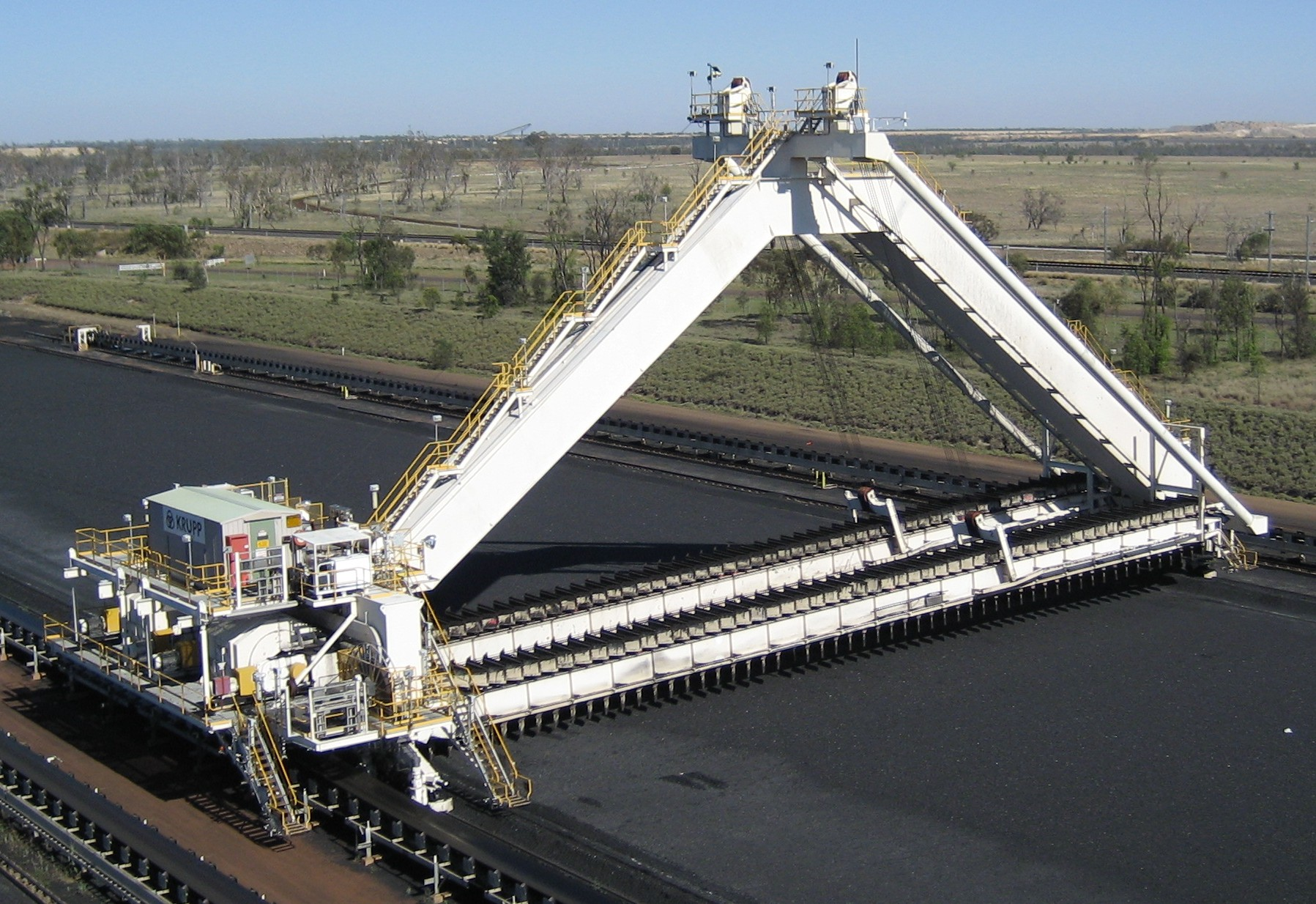
Krupp twin-boom portal reclaimer at RTCA Kestrel Mine

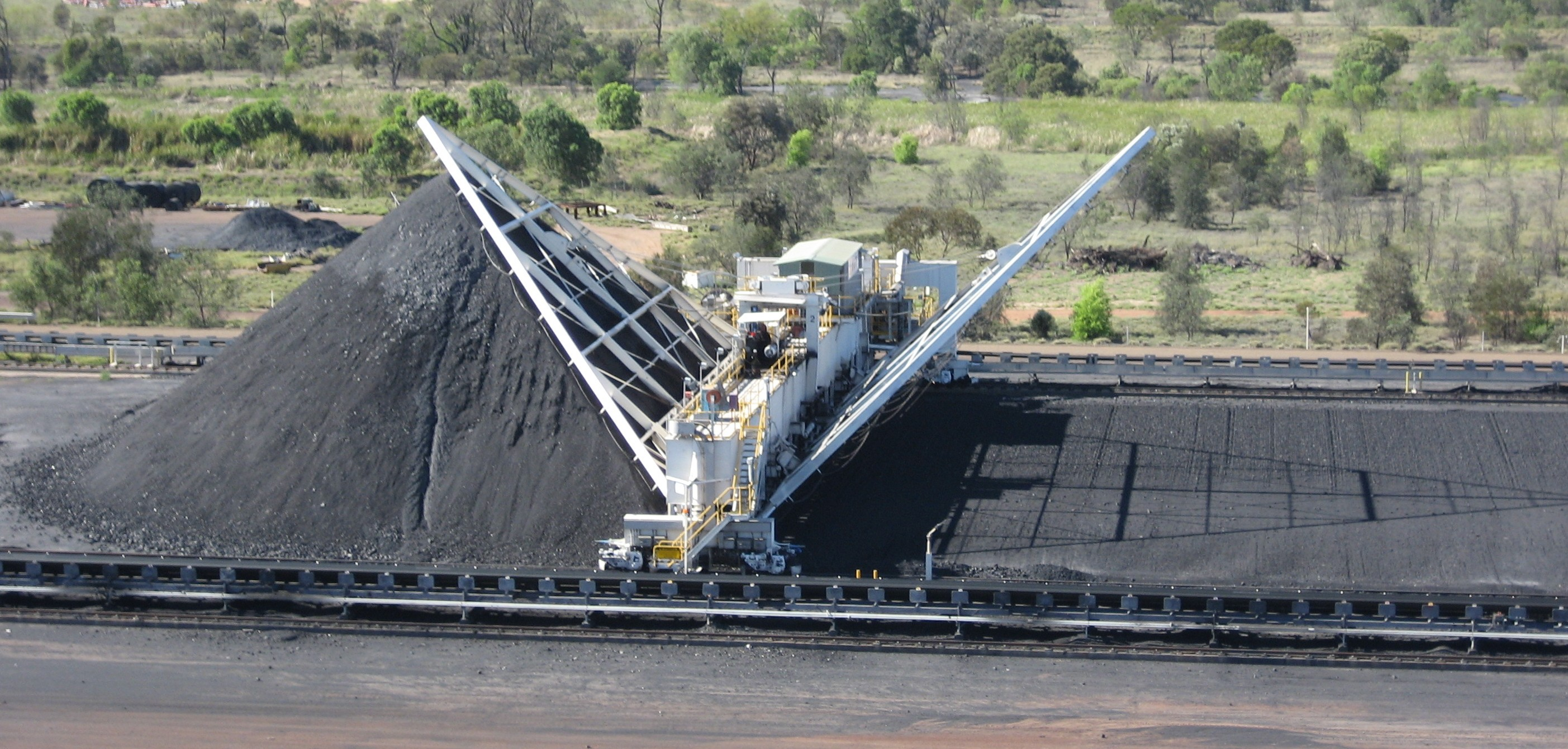
Krupp bridge reclaimer at RTCA Kestrel Mine

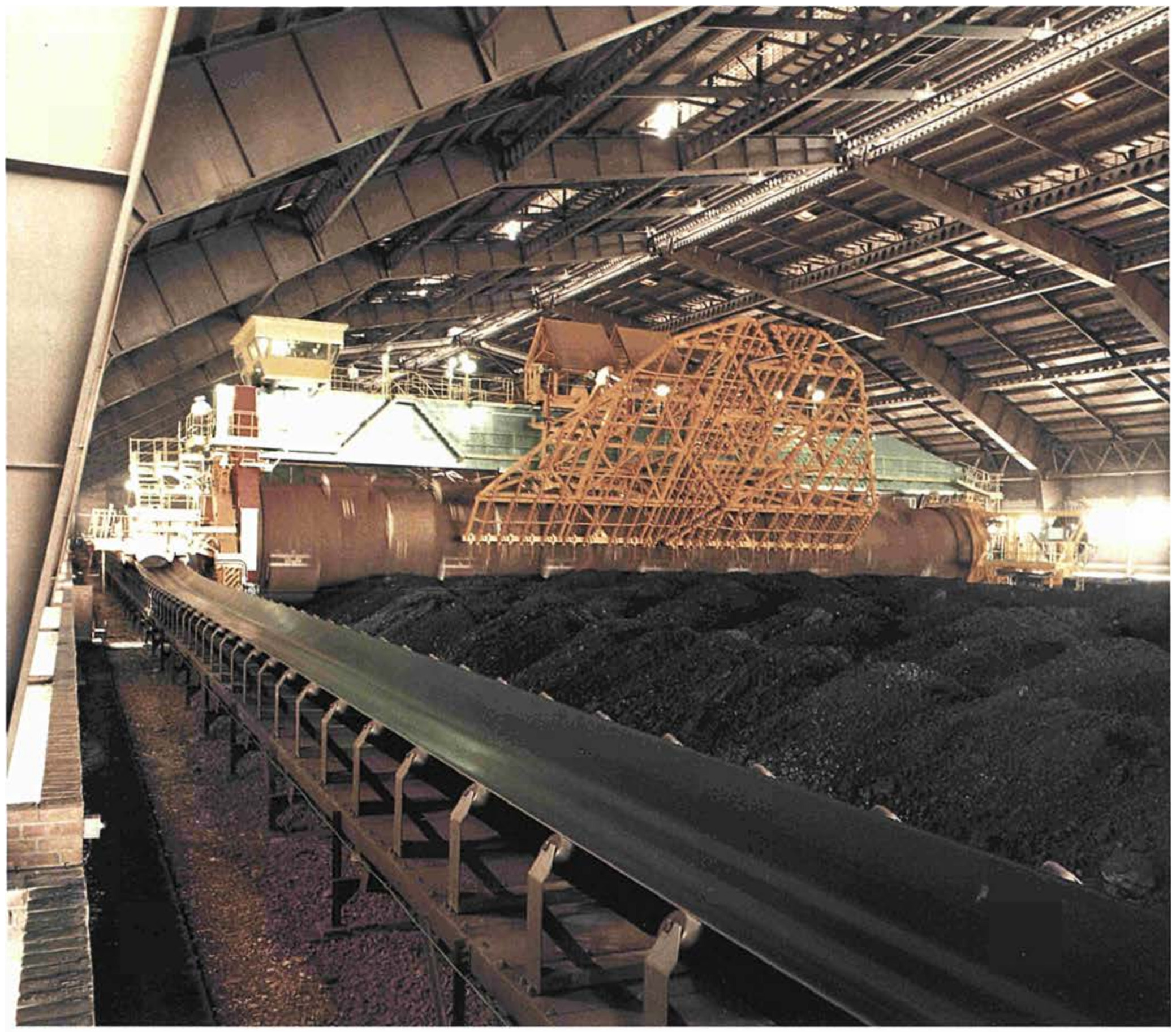
Drum reclaimer at the Gascoigne Wood coal mine

A reclaimer is a large machine used in bulk material handling applications. A reclaimer's function is to recover bulk material such as ores and cereals from a stockpile. A stacker is used to stack the material.

Reclaimers are volumetric machines and are rated in m^{3}/h (cubic meters per hour) for capacity, which is often converted to t/h (tonnes per hour) based on the average bulk density of the material being reclaimed. Reclaimers normally travel on a rail between stockpiles in the stockyard. A bucket wheel reclaimer can typically move in three directions: horizontally along the rail; vertically by "luffing" its boom and rotationally by slewing its boom. Reclaimers are generally electrically powered by means of a trailing cable.

== Reclaimer types ==
Bucket wheel reclaimers use "bucket wheels" to remove material from the pile they are reclaiming. Scraper reclaimers use a series of scrapers on a chain to reclaim the material.

The reclaimer structure can be of a number of types, including portal and bridge. Reclaimers are named based on their type, for example, "Bridge reclaimer." Portal and bridge reclaimers can both use either bucket wheels or scrapers to reclaim the product. Bridge type reclaimers blend the stacked product as it is reclaimed.

Whenever material is laid down during any reclaiming process, it creates a pile. Blending bed stacker reclaimers form such piles in a circular fashion. They do this by taking reclaimed material and passing it through a conveyor system that rotates around the center of the pile to create a circle. This allows the pile to be evenly spread out during the reclaiming process and allows for the oldest material in the pile to be reclaimed before the newer material. During this process, a harrow tool is used to cut through the reclaimed material so that the material can be combined. Some Blending bed reclaimers are equipped with rakes to ensure that no material gets stuck in the machine. These rakes are made with various materials and sizes based on the climate in which the reclaimer operates. In below freezing temperatures, a harder material is used to create a rake with modified edges, which allow for any ice or debris to be broken up before piling.

Cantilever chain reclaimers are designed to use longer booms. Cantilever chain reclaimers use a truss system that is connected to a liner and then to a chain, this chain is bolted onto the elevation chute and fixed to the reclaimer. The angle of this boom is then set by a cable-winch system and is supported using a cable system. With the cable, the boom can be lowered slightly during each reclaiming cycle. This chain system creates a push and pull effect that allows for any loose material to be collected and moved to the edge of the reclaimed pile. After the loose material is collected it is lifted and moved for further processing.

== Reclaimer applications ==
A reclaimer is used principally in reclaiming processes. These processes can have low, medium, and high material flow rates. Reclaimers are made up of a bucket-wheel, a counterweight boom, and a rocker; they also use a conveyor system to move any material reclaimed from the boom to its specific pile. These machines can be assembled differently based on the required reclaiming load rate and boom length. These changes are made in order to accommodate for the associated fluctuations in flow rates and load patterns. In the event of high material flow rates, a combination of a boom and bucket wheel is used.

== Control systems ==
Stackers and Reclaimers were originally manually controlled machines with no remote control. Modern machines are typically fully automated with their parameters (for stacking or reclaiming) remotely set. Some older reclaimers may still be manually controlled, as reclaiming is more difficult to automate than stacking because the automatic detection of pile edges is complicated by different environmental conditions and different bulk materials.

== See also ==
- Stacker
- Bucket-wheel excavator
