= Overburden Conveyor Bridge F60 =

Mining equipment

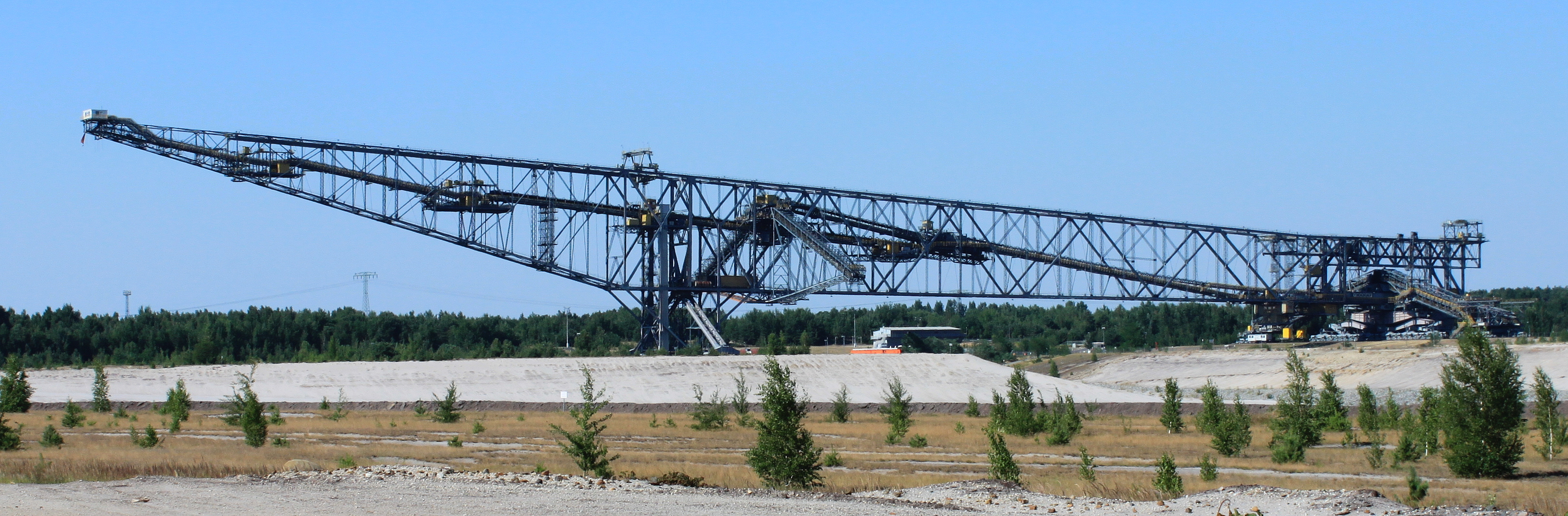
- Panorama of the F60 in the Jänschwalde mine.

Overview
- Type: Overburden Conveyor Bridge
- Manufacturer: Volkseigener Betrieb TAKRAF
- Also called: F60
- Production: 1969-1991
- Model years: 1969
- Assembly: Germany - Lusatia: *Jänschwalde; *Welzow-Süd; *Lichterfeld-Schacksdorf; *Nochten and Reichwalde

Powertrain
- Engine: Externally powered electricity, 27 MW (35,000 hp)
- Propulsion: 2 x rails, 2x bogies (total of 760 wheels)

Dimensions
- Wheelbase: 56 in (1,435 mm)
- Length: 502 m (1,647 ft)
- Width: 241 m (790 ft)
- Height: 79 m (260 ft)
- Curb weight: 13,600 t (30,000,000 lb)

F60 is the series designation of five overburden conveyor bridges used in brown coal (lignite) opencast mining in the Lusatian coalfields in Germany. They were built by the former Volkseigener Betrieb TAKRAF in Lauchhammer and are the largest movable technical industrial machines in the world. As overburden conveyor bridges, they transport the overburden which lies over the coal seam. The cutting height is 60 m (200 ft), hence the name F60. In total, the F60 is up to 80 m (260 ft) high and 240 m (790 ft) wide; with a length of 502 m (1,647 ft), it is described as the horizontal Eiffel Tower, making these behemoths not only the longest vehicle ever made—beating Prelude FLNG, the longest ship—but the largest vehicle by physical dimensions ever made by humankind. In operating condition, it weighs 13,600 metric tons making the F60 also one of the heaviest land vehicles ever made, beaten only by Bagger 293, which is a giant bucket-wheel excavator. Nevertheless, despite its immense size, it is operated by only a crew of 14. The first conveyor bridge was built from 1969 to 1972, being equipped with a feeder bridge in 1977. The second was built from 1972 to 1974, having been equipped with a feeder bridge during construction. The third conveyor bridge was built from 1976 to 1978, being provided with a feeder bridge in 1985. The fourth and fifth conveyor bridges were built 1986–1988 and 1988–1991 respectively.

There are still four F60s in operation in the Lusatian coalfields today: in the brown coal opencast mines in Jänschwalde (Brandenburg, near Jänschwalde Power Station), Welzow-Süd (Brandenburg, near Schwarze Pumpe Power Station), Nochten and Reichwalde (Saxony, both near Boxberg Power Station). The fifth F60, the last one built, is in Lichterfeld-Schacksdorf and is accessible to visitors.

== Technology ==
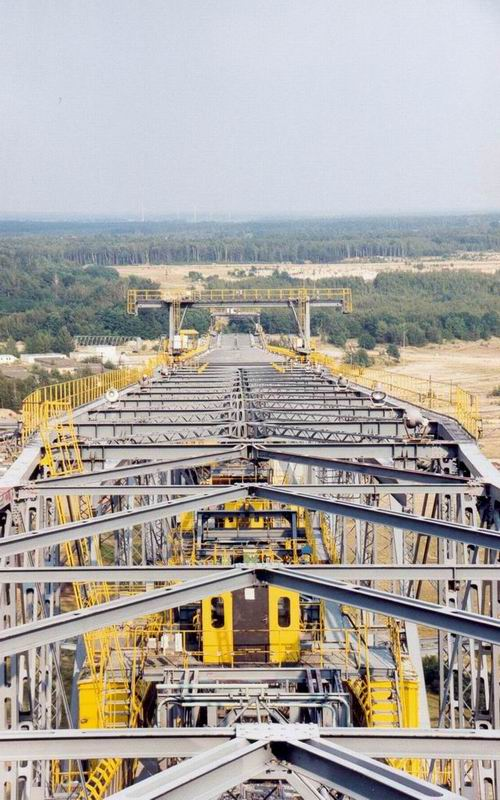
The F60 in Lichterfeld, along the entire length

The F60 has two bogies, one on the dumping side (front) and one on the excavating side (back), which each run on two rails (1,435 mm or 4 ft 8 1/2 in standard gauge). In addition to the two rails on the excavating side, there are another two rails for the transformer and cable cars. There are a total of 760 wheels on the bogies, of which 380 are powered. The maximum speed of the F60 is 13 m/min (0.78 km/h) and the operating speed is 9 m/min (0.54 km/h). All in all, the F60 is powered by two large Siemens Type 1DM6536-4AA14-Z electric motors which supply more than 1,800 horsepower of electricity, the motors themselves are connected to 6,000 meters of cable capable of supplying up to 30,000 volts. However, like the majority of ultraheavy mining machines, the F60 gets the majority of its power from a nearby external coal power plant. Because of the physical limitations of the cable, the F60 only has an operational range of 6km.

The F60 has two bucket chain excavators of Type Es 3750 on the sides to do preparatory work (see the panoramic photograph from the Jänschwalde mine), one each on the northern and southern crosswise conveyor. They each have an output of 29,000 m^{3}/h (38,000 cuyd/h) (26,448 t/h or 26,030 long ton/h or 29,154 short ton/h), which corresponds to a volume the size of a soccer field with a depth of 7–8 m (23–26 ft). There are nine various overburden conveyor belts with a speed of 10 m/min (0.60 km/h). The F60, including the two excavators, requires 27,000 kW (36,000 hp) of power. The bridge needs 1.2 kWh (4.3 MJ; 4,100 BTU) of electricity to convey one cubic metre (35 cu ft) of overburden, from the crosswise conveyors up to the dumping at a height of 75 m (246 ft).

== The Lichterfeld F60 ==
The overburden conveyor bridge of Lichterfeld-Schacksdorf, now shut down, was used from 1991 until 1992 in the brown coal mine Klettwitz-Nord near Klettwitz. It is open for visitors today as a project of the Internationale Bauausstellung Fürst-Pückler-Land (International Mining Exhibition Fürst-Pückler-Land) and is an anchor of the European Route of Industrial Heritage (ERIH).

This F60 is the last of five F60s. The installation was carried out between 1988 and 1991 in the Klettwitz-Nord opencast mine. The F60 began operation in March 1991. Between its commission and its shutting down in June 1992, it moved around 27 km^{3} (6.5 cu mi) of overburden. After the German reunification, the mine became the responsibility of the Lausitzer und Mitteldeutsche Bergbau-Verwaltungsgesellschaft (Lusatian and Middle-German Mining Administrative Society, LMBV), which closed the mine on the orders of the German federal government and renovated it economically and in a way not harmful to the environment.

Between 2000 and 2010, the Internationale Bauausstellung Fürst-Pückler-Land is pursuing the goal of giving new momentum to the region and the former opencast mine of Klettwitz-Nord has also been integrated into that concept. The mine has been converted into a 'visitors' mine' and the conveyor bridge has been accessible since 1998. Various sound and light installations help make the facility an attraction for visitors.

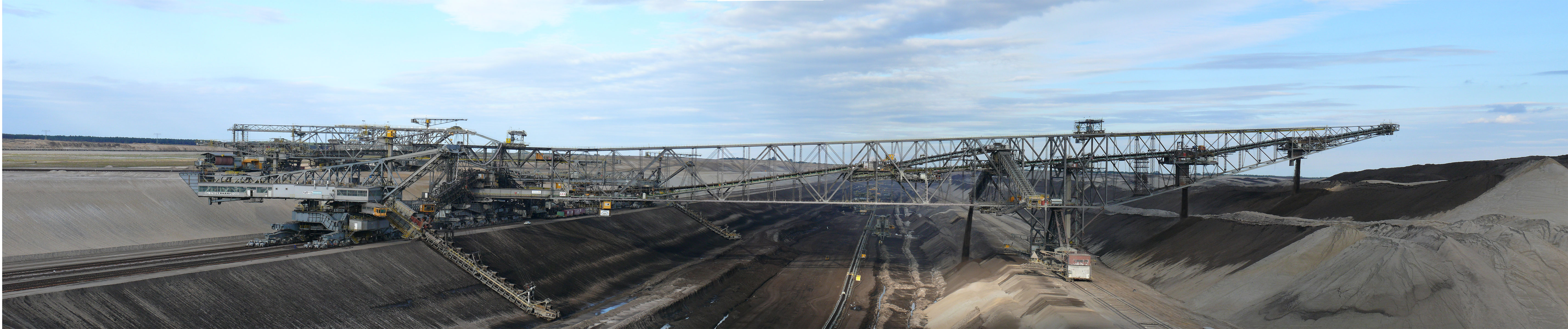
