= Couvreux =

Couvreux may refer to:

- Alphonse Couvreux (1820–1890), French public works contractor, known for inventing the bucket chain excavator
- Couvreux, Vallonia, parth of Rouvroy, Belgium
- Port Couvreux, former settlement of the Kerguelen Islands
