= Takraf India Pvt. Ltd. =

TAKRAF India Pvt. Ltd.
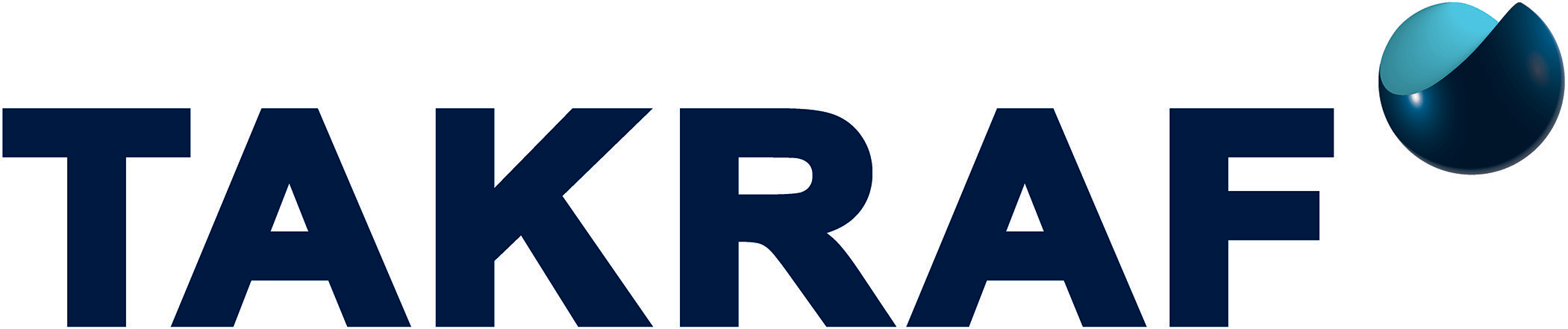
- Company type: Wholly owned subsidiary
- Industry: Mining and associated industries
- Founded: 1995
- Headquarters: Chennai, India
- Products: • Mining Systems & Equipment • Bulk Material Handling • Minerals Processing • Services & Components • Dry Stack Tailings (DST) Management • In Pit Crushing & Conveying (IPCC)
- Parent: TAKRAF GmbH
- Website: www.takraf.com

TAKRAF slewing stacker and bucket wheel reclaimer

TAKRAF overland conveyor

TAKRAF bucket wheel reclaimers

TAKRAF India Private Limited is a wholly owned subsidiary of TAKRAF GmbH. As with its parent company, TAKRAF India provides equipment, systems and services to the mining and associated industries through the TAKRAF and DELKOR brands.

TAKRAF India operates a DELKOR product & service center in Bengaluru, dedicated to DELKOR minerals processing equipment

== Foundation ==
TAKRAF India commenced operations in India in 1995 in Chennai as a fully owned subsidiary of TAKRAF GmbH (then a part of MAN SE Group). Following the acquisition of TAKRAF by the international Techint Group in 2007, the entity now operates as part of the worldwide TAKRAF Group. TAKRAF India has its headquarters in Chennai, with offices in Pune as well as a DELKOR office in Kolkata and the aforementioned product & service center in Bengaluru.

Amongst its major customers is Neyveli Lignite Corporation (NLC), for whom it supplied Asia's largest earth moving machine (HEMM) – a 20,000 t/h spreader in 2004.

More recently, a 19 km overland conveyor system supplied to the Utkal Alumina project included the longest single flight conveyor system to be installed to date within Indian territory. The project was originally conceived by Bateman India (at the time a sister entity of DELKOR India with its turnkey business being later integrated into the DELKOR India business unit of TAKRAF Group.

Two TAKRAF high-capacity bucket-wheel reclaimers commissioned at a privately operated port are amongst the largest of such machines operating in India, considering boom length and reclaiming capacity.

The new generation DELKOR BQR flotation cell, which is equipped with the MAXGen mechanism, was also first applied commercially at a cement works in India.

In 2021, TAKRAF India trialed an In-Pit Crushing & Conveying (IPCC) system at a mine in India, the operation of which is anticipated to have significant environmental benefits as it will enable the mine to reduce its carbon footprint by reducing the use of diesel-based truck haulage.

== Products ==
TAKRAF India specializes in providing equipment, systems and services to the mining and associated industries, with a focus on energy saving, lowering environmental impact and meeting operational requirements.

- Mining Systems & Equipment: excavating; primary crushing plants, including In-Pit Crushing & Conveying (IPCC) systems; conveying; dumping/spreading; and auxiliary equipment
- Bulk material handling: stockyard & disposal facilities; loading/unloading equipment; conveying; port facilities; continuous heap leach systems; and various “in-plant” handling equipment
- Minerals Processing: comminution; liquid/solid separation; wet processing; and Dry Stack Tailings (DST)
- Services & Components: project development services; fabrication & components; construction & commissioning; technical services; and spare parts

== See also ==
- TAKRAF GmbH
