= Type Es 3750 bucket chain excavator =

The Type Es 3750 or simply the Es 3750 is a series of bucket chain excavators built by TAKRAF and used in Germany. According to TAKRAF, they boast that the Type Es 3750 is the largest bucket chain excavators in the world. Type Es 3750s are notable for being always used in conjunction with the Overburden Conveyor Bridge F60, another very large land vehicle.

== Specifications ==
The Type Es 3750 are immense digging vessels, the largest of its kind according to TAKRAF. Each Type Es 3750 has the total length of 137 m (449 ft), a height of 40.5 m (133 ft) and a weight of 5,118 t (11,300,000 lb). The cutting height of the BCE's chain boom is 34 m (112 ft) to 35.5 m (116 ft), whilst its cutting depth is 31 m (102 ft) to 31.2 m (102 ft). In total, the chain boom is capable of excavating a maximum capacity of 14,500 m^{3}/h. The buckets itself is reinforced by 5 to 10 mm steel plates to prevent deformation and wear-and-tear.

A unique design choice for the Type Es 3750 is the presence of two excavator's control cockpit, each spraying outwards on the left and right side of the machine. Given that it predominantly moves side-to-side with the F60, this is to be expected. Likewise, it also possess a small complement of men of around 2–5. Another unique feature is that the Type Es 3750 runs on rails. Since it is largely grouped closely with the F60, the Type Es 3750 share the same gauge as the F60 - 56 in (1,435 mm). Likewise, the vehicles share their power source with the F60 and the nearby external coal power plant and therefore, moves the same speed as the F60.

== Operations ==
The Type Es 3750 was built in almost exactly the same time as the F60s during 1978 in East Germany. Each F60 were to be expected to be accompanied by two Type Es 3750 to assist the machine in transferring overburden and lignite coal. One Type Es 3750 is purposed to excavate the topside whilst another is used to excavate the depths. Excavated materials would be transported on side conveyors towards the F60 for the materials to be properly redistributed. As there were originally five F60s, a total of 10 Type Es 3750 BCEs were built, but with the retirement of one of the F60s in Lichterfeld-Schacksdorf, only 8 remain in service.

== Gallery ==
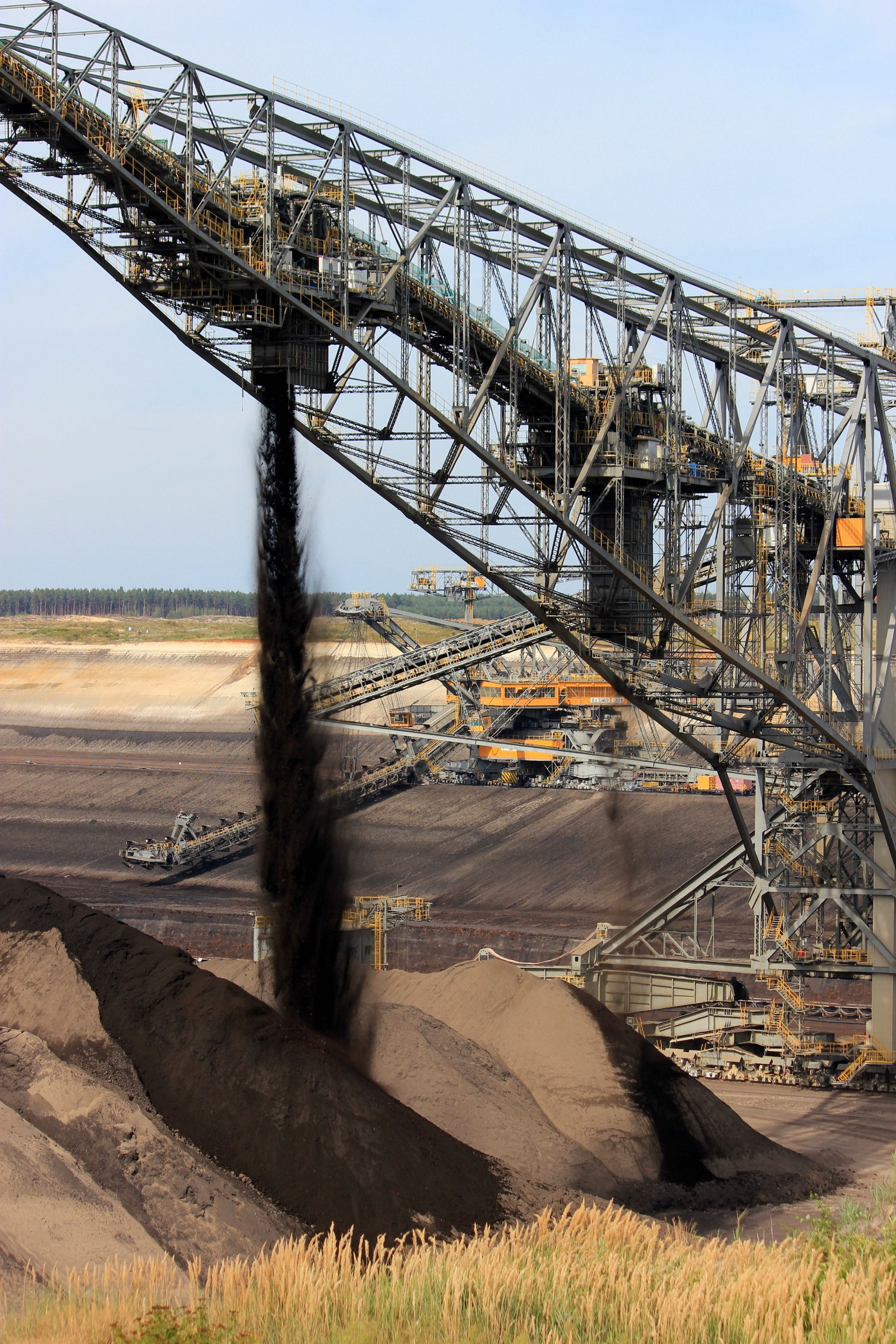

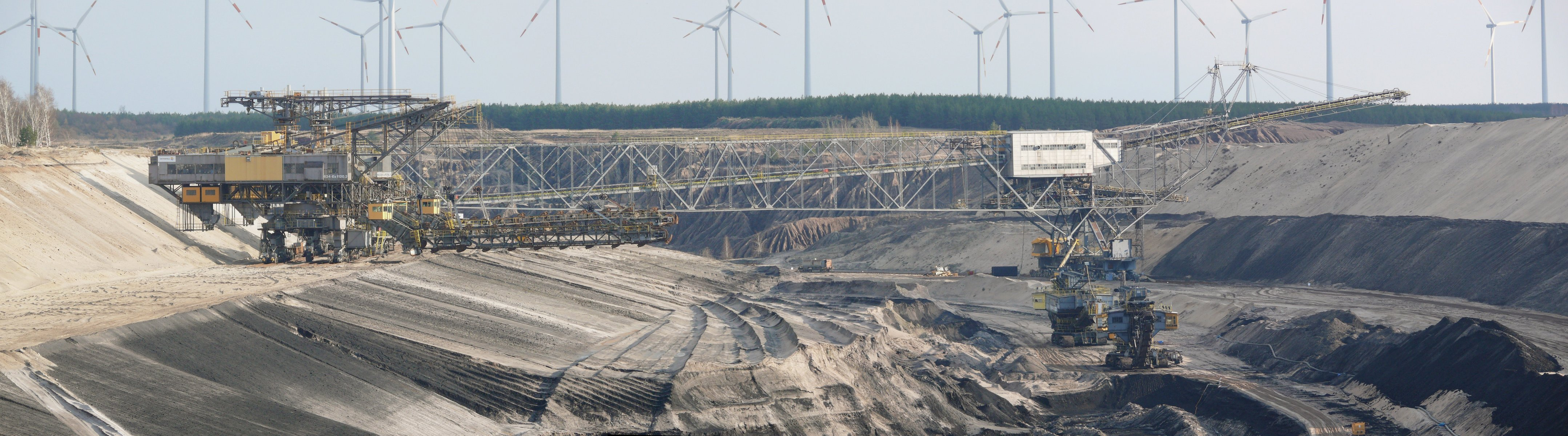

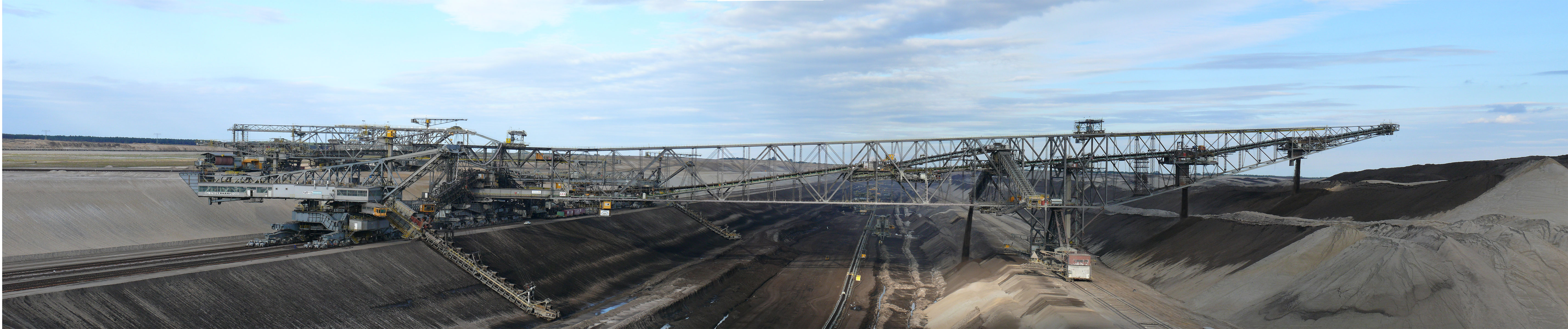
