= Type SRs 2000 bucket-wheel excavator =

Series of Bucket wheel excavators

The Type SRs 2000 (or Type SRs (K) 2000 in China) is a class of medium-sized bucket-wheel excavators built by TAKRAF. It is by far, one of the most common and recognizable BWEs built and sold by TAKRAF, with 56 Type SRs 2000s being commissioned and launched as of 2013.

== Specifications ==
It is a medium-sized BWE that reach dimensions of 3,300 t (7,280,000 lb), a length of 160 m (525 ft), a width of 30 m (98 ft) and a height of 40 m (131 ft); its ground pressure is much lower than that of a D11 Dozer. It was built to replace the aging Type SRs 1200s BWEs, with the Type SRs 2000s possessing more efficient and cost-saving energy power lines and drive conveyor belt systems. The Type SRs 2000s are powered by at least four 1,825 kilowatts (2,447 hp) powered electric motor with 20-30kV trailing cable, and whilst it is externally powered like all BWEs, the total operational power is currently unknown.

The bucket-wheel dimensions are 11.2 m (37 ft) in diameter with 14 buckets. It is able to excavate a total capacity that can range between 4900 and 7000 m^{3}/h with a digging force of around 100 kN/m. The bucket wheel excavator reaches 30 m digging height with a cutting depth of -10 meters.

Although construction of the Type SRs 2000 began in 1989 with one of the first batches being sent to Ekibastusz in then Kazakh SSR (USSR), it only began official global commissioning and serialization in 2008, with the China-export model, the Type SRs (K) 2000 being commissioned in 2013. The Type SRs (K) 2000 export model has a slight modification that allows the BWE to resist temperatures varying from +39 °C down to -39 °C, which is needed given the varied temperature change in Inner Mongolia.

== Current and former operators ==
- East Germany (former)
- Soviet Union (former)
- Germany
- Greece
- China

== See also ==
- List of largest machines
- Bucket-wheel excavators
- Landships
- Type SRs 8000
