= Bucket chain excavator =

Heavy equipment used in surface mining and dredging

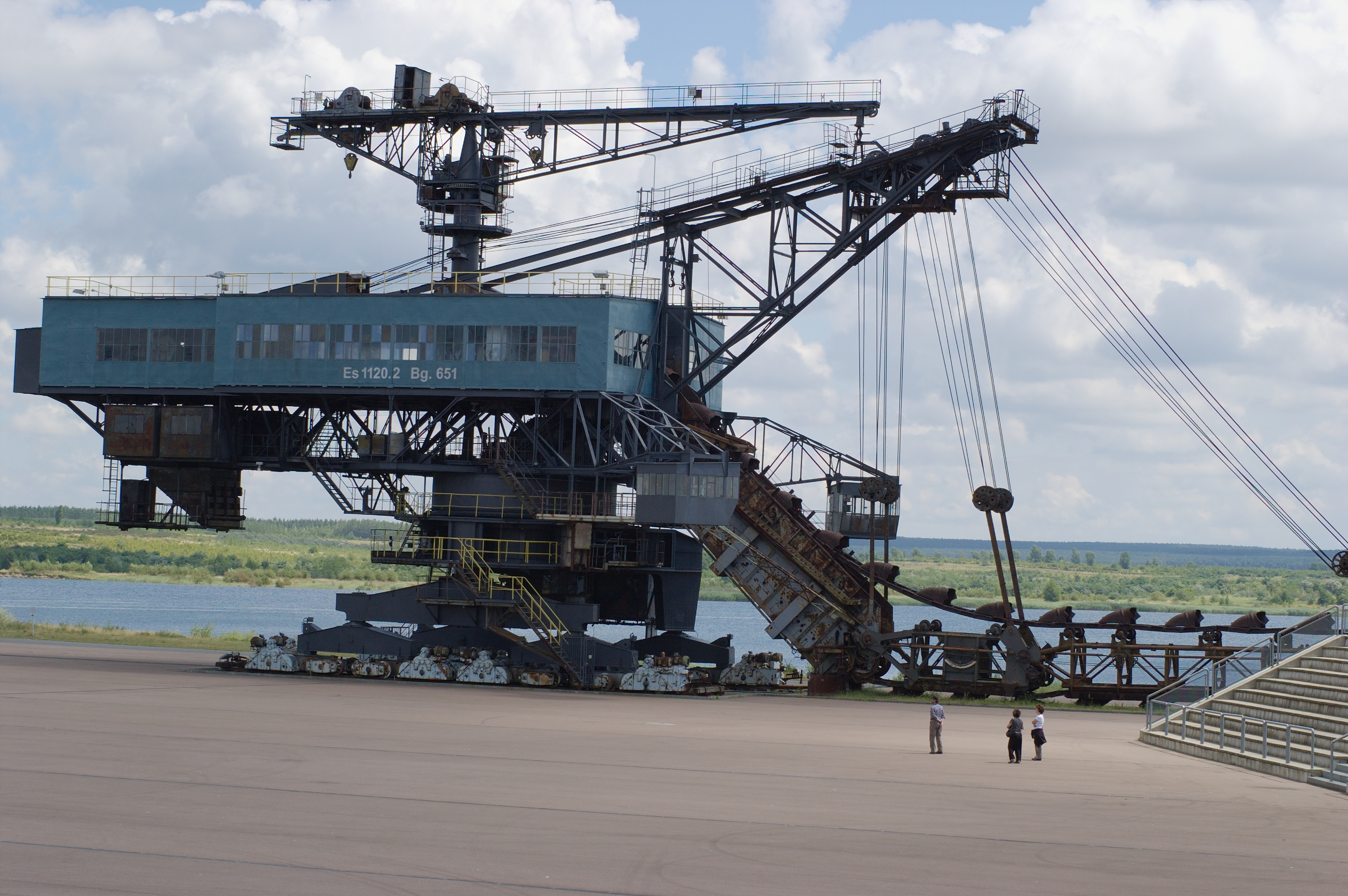
Bucket chain excavator, human for size comparison.

A bucket chain excavator (BCE) is a piece of heavy equipment used in surface mining and dredging. BCEs use buckets on a revolving chain to remove large quantities of material. They are similar to bucket-wheel excavators and trenchers. Bucket chain excavators remove material from below their plane of movement, which is useful if the pit floor is unstable or underwater.

== History ==
The first documented use of a bucket chain excavator was in 1859 by Alphonse Couvreux, a French entrepreneur. Several Couvreux BCEs were used in the construction of the Suez Canal.

== Overview ==
A bucket chain excavator works similarly to a bucket wheel excavator, using a series of buckets to dig into the material before dumping it in the bucket chute and depositing it through a discharge boom. The primary difference is that the buckets are mounted on a flexible chain similarly to a chainsaw blade rather than on a rigid wheel. BCEs are used primarily to excavate material below the vehicle's superstructure while bucket wheel excavators focus primarily on excavating top soil overburden and/or resources.

BCEs vary in range and size, although the majority of them are extremely large, with some capable of excavating 14,500 m^{3}/h. The average BCE from Tenova Takraf for example, weighs around 1,150 tons and has a combined length of 58.5 meters, with a 23.5 meter long bucket ladder. The speed of the bucket chain is 1.22 m/s with a digging force of 1,170 kN/m^{2}. BCEs such as the RK 5000 from the Czech Republic weigh up to 5,000 tons. The largest BCE model currently known is the Takraf Type Es 3750, with a length of over 130 meters, a height of around 40 meters and a weight of 5,118 t (11,300,000 lb)

Nevertheless, bucket chain excavators are usually smaller than bucket wheel excavators, dragline excavators or conveyor bridges due to the limitations of excavating materials below the base of the vehicle.

== Structure ==
The superstructure of a bucket chain excavator is similar to that of a bucket wheel excavator.

The primary component of bucket chain excavators is the bucket ladder and the bucket-chain. Unlike the buckets on a BWE, the buckets on the chain face downwards, allowing the machine to remove overburden or materials significantly below the bench or travel level.

The excavated materials are deposited through the bucket chute. Material can be transferred to a bench conveyor directly or via a discharge boom or mobile conveyor bridge.

Like the BWEs, bucket chain excavators also feature a fixed or rotating superstructure with a counterweight boom that allows the cutting boom a certain degree of verticality. Likewise have a substructure equipped with either a rail or crawler-mounted undercarriage for mobility and transportation. Some BCEs have 'hopping' pontoons similar to those found on walking dragline excavators.

== Gallery ==
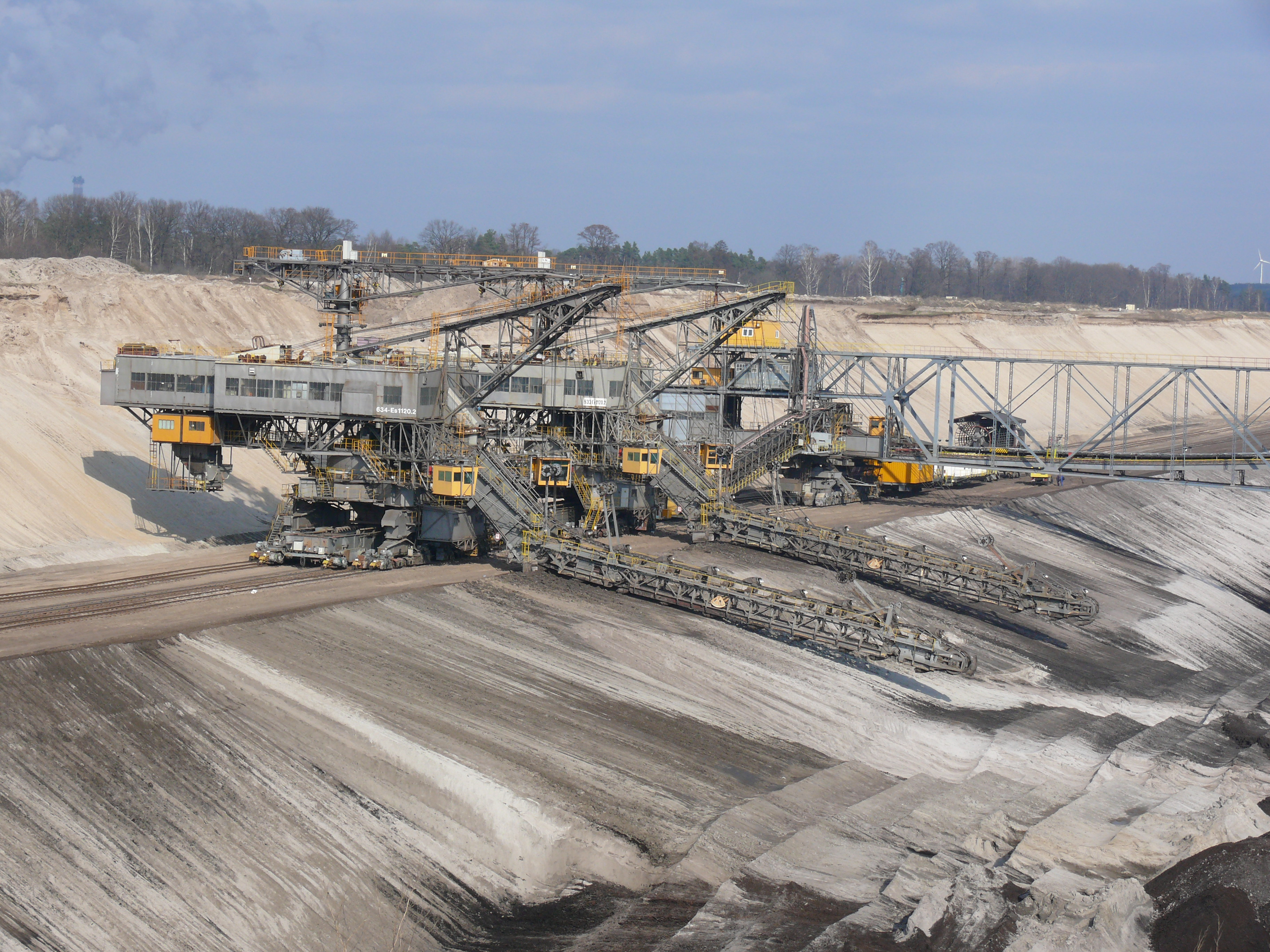
Two Type Es 3750 BCEs supporting a conveyor bridge.

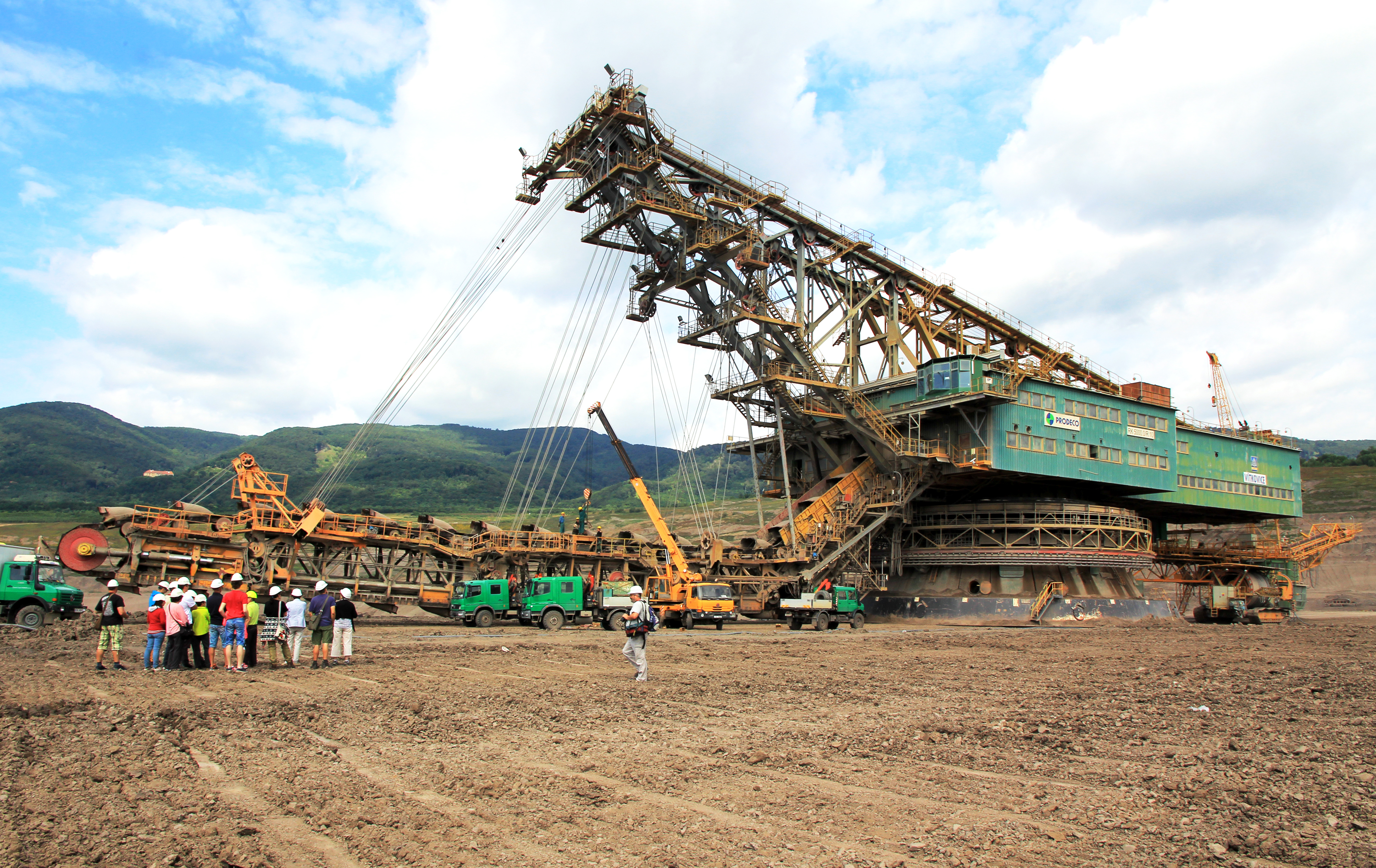
RK 5000 BCE with walking mechanism.

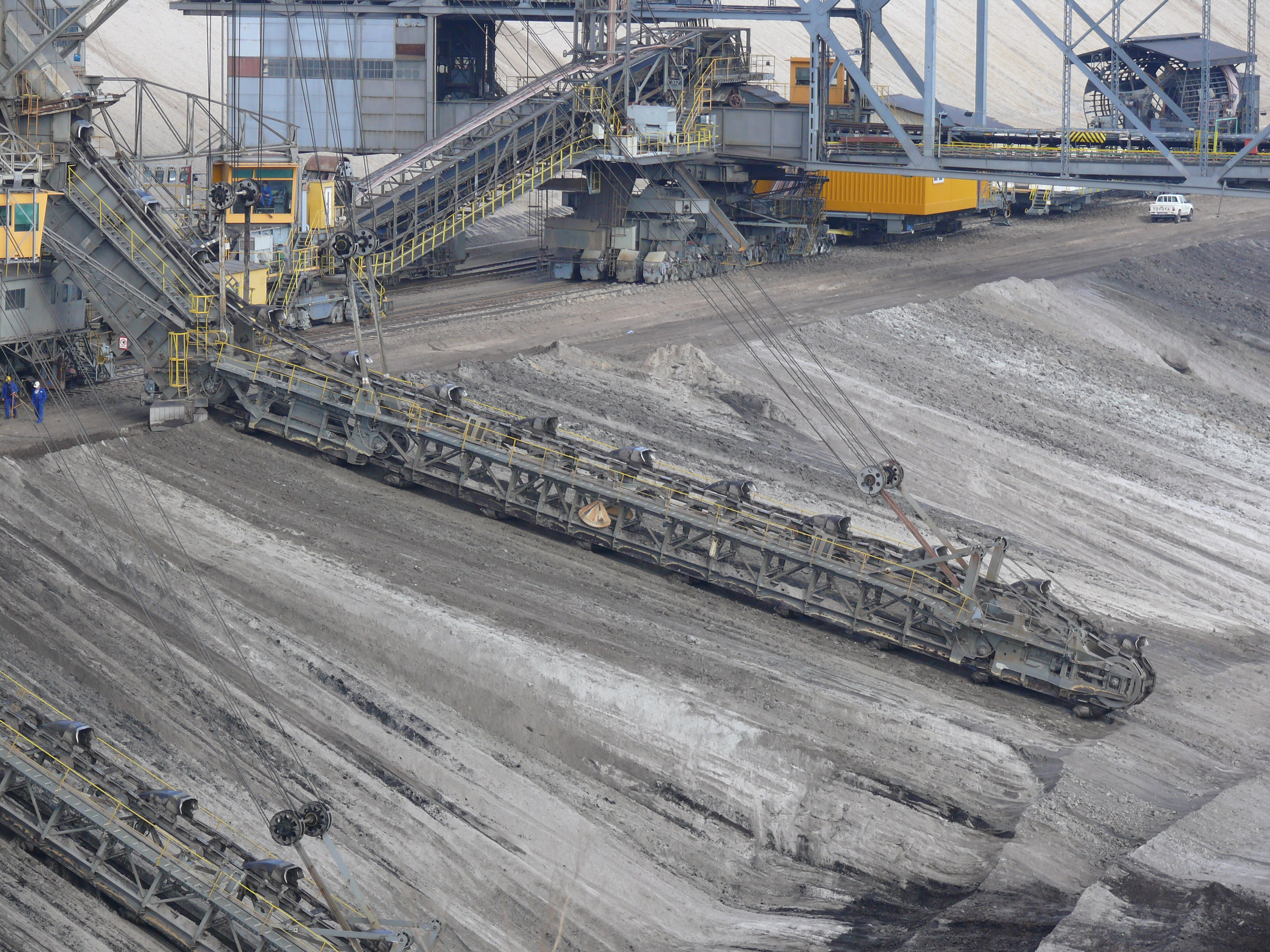
Open pit mining in Cottbus-Nord

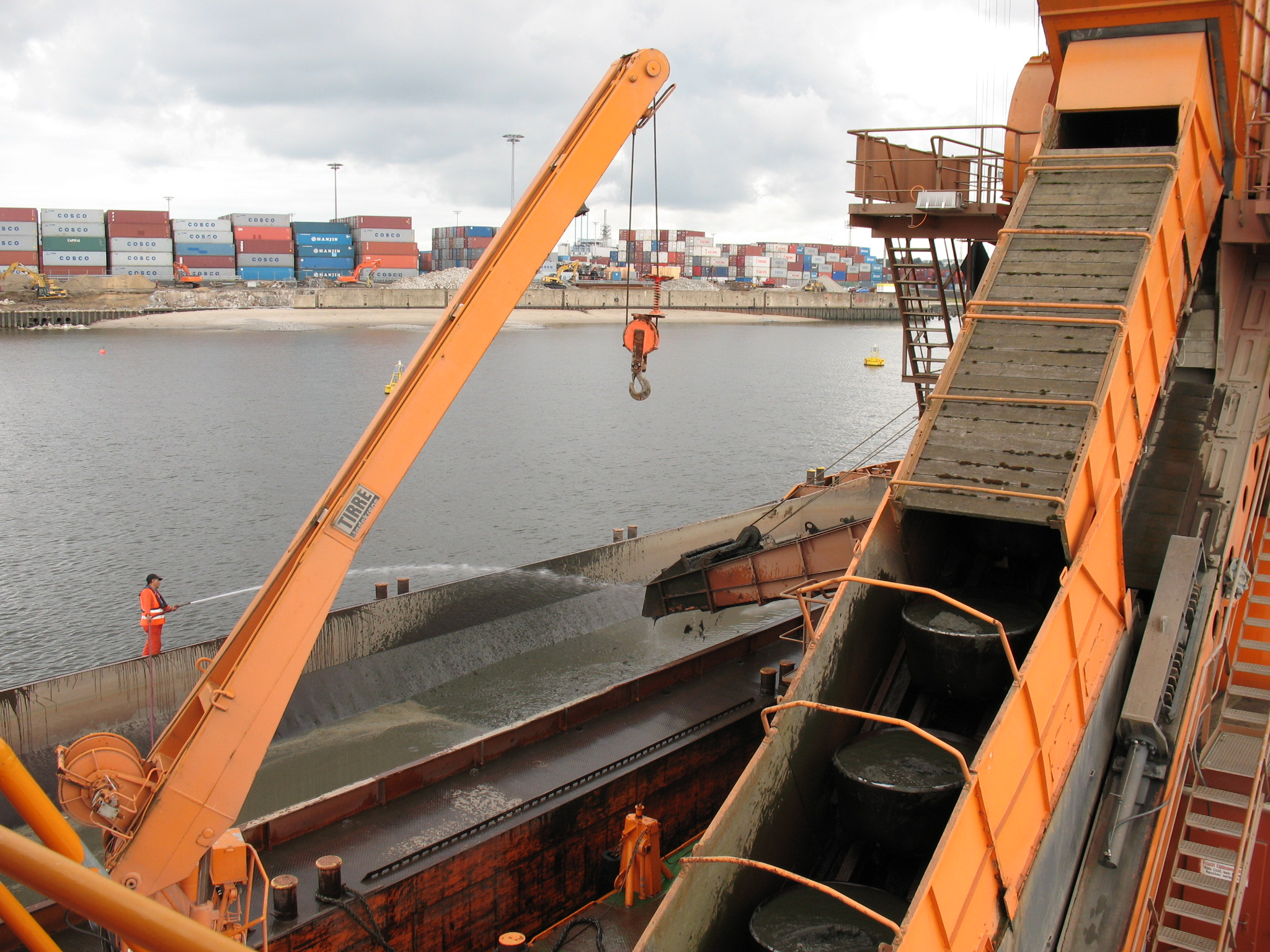
Bucket dredger Heimdall

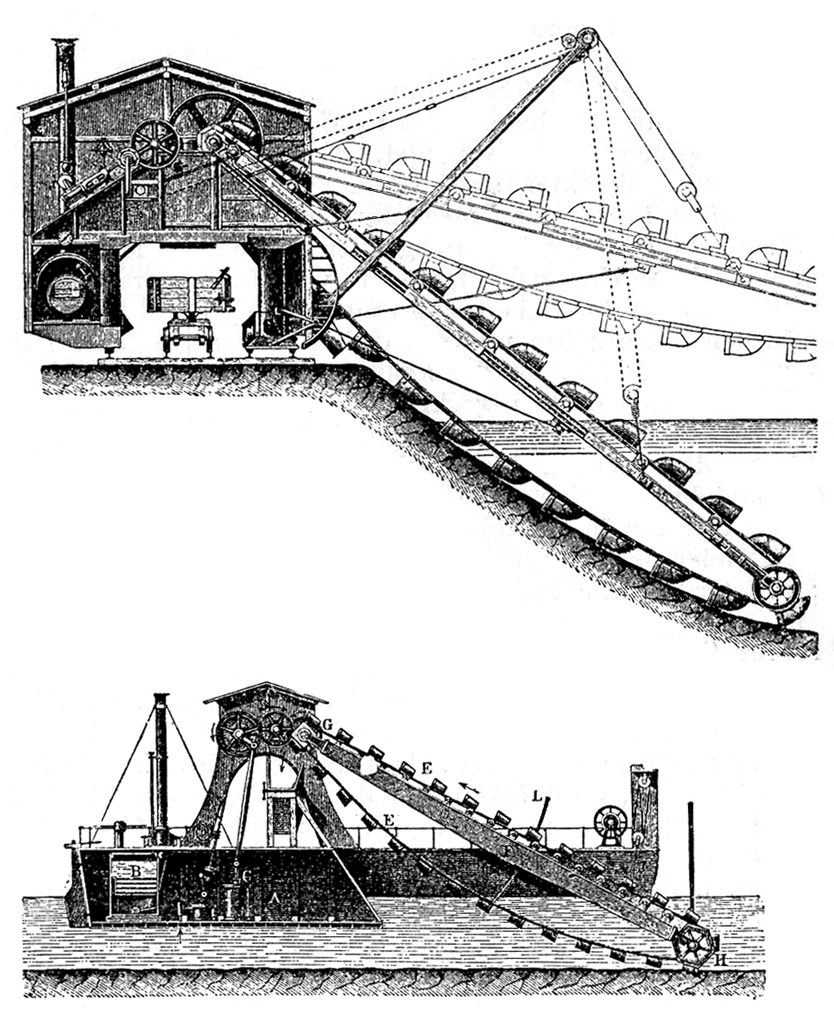
Bucket dredging

== See also ==
- Long reach excavator
