= Conveyor bridge =

Mining equipment

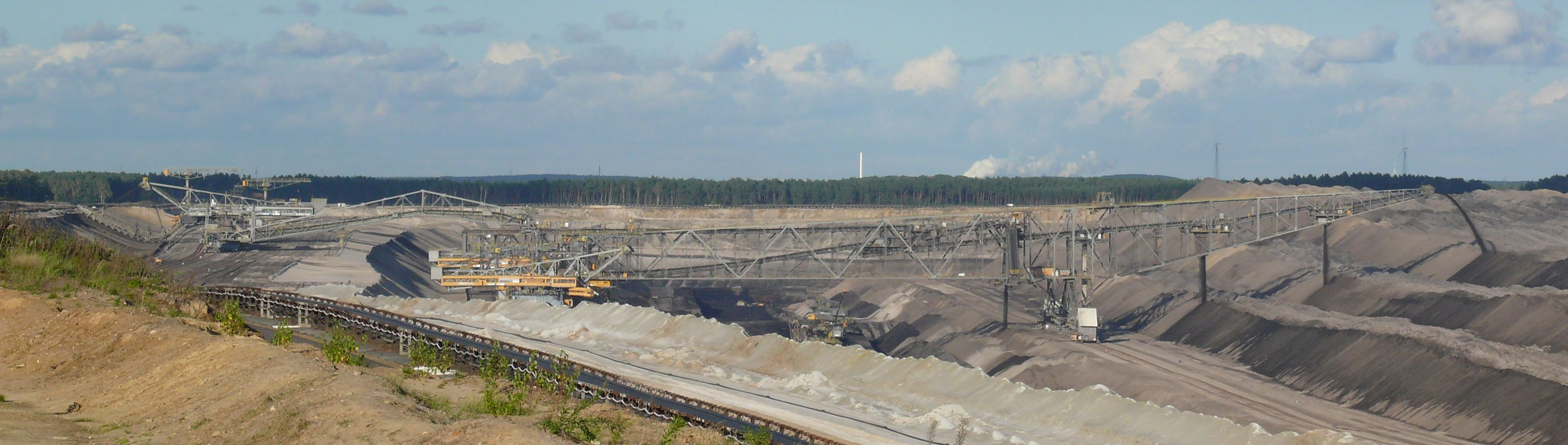
The F60 conveyor bridge in operation in Welzow-Süd mine

A conveyor bridge is a piece of mining equipment used in strip mining for the removal of overburden and for dumping it on the inner spoil bank of the open-cut mine. It is used together with multibucket excavators, frequently bucket chain excavators, that remove the overburden which is moved to the bridge by connecting conveyors. Conveyor bridges are used in working horizontally layered deposits with soft overburden rock in areas where mean annual temperatures are above freezing. They are frequently used in lignite mining.

They are known for their gargantuan size, with the largest, the F60 series, being the largest vehicle by physical dimensions and one of the largest ground vehicles ever made.

== Setup ==
A conveyor bridge consists of girders resting on two or three supports mounted on rails, or sometimes on crawler tracks. The bridge is set across the pit and moves along the mining face at a few metres per minute. If it runs on rails, the tracks are shifted in accordance with the progress of the mining. The rock is moved from the excavator to the bridge by connecting conveyors. The dumping support of a conveyor bridge may rest on the soil of the seam or on a dumping mound specially poured and packed by the bridge itself, depending on the stability of the rock.

== History and examples ==
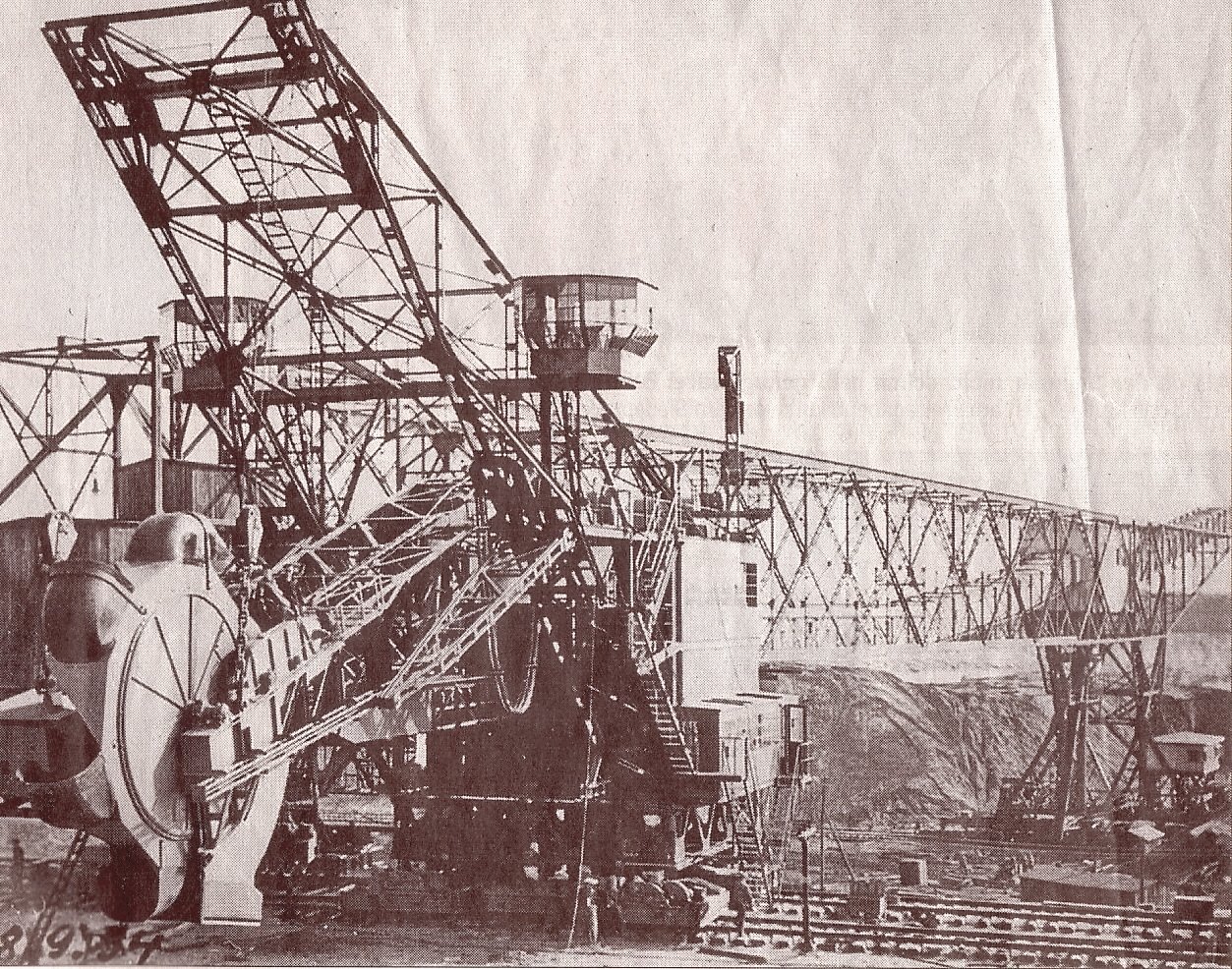
First conveyor bridge in Agnes lignite mine near Plessa

The first conveyor bridge was built in Plessa lignite mine, Agnes according to plans of mine director Friedrich von Delius. It was scrapped in 1959 after exposure of clay beds made mining in the pit unsafe.

A large conveyor bridge with 200 m span and 50 m height, fed by a bucket-wheel excavator, was completed in 1930 in the Böhlen lignite mine. After it was toppled by a storm in 1937, a replacement went into service in 1939.

The conveyor bridge of Espenhain lignite mine with a total length of 545 m, which started operation in 1944, could remove an overburden of 45 m thickness.

Between 1969 and 1991, TAKRAF built five very large conveyor bridges of the type F60 of which four are still in operation in lignite mines in Lower Lusatia, and one has been preserved as a visitor attraction. These were constructed for removing overburden up to 60 m thick, are 502 m long and span 204 m. They could move originally up to 23000 m^{3}/h, with additional excavators up to 34600 m^{3}/h.
