= Port Jeanne d'Arc =

- Whaling station
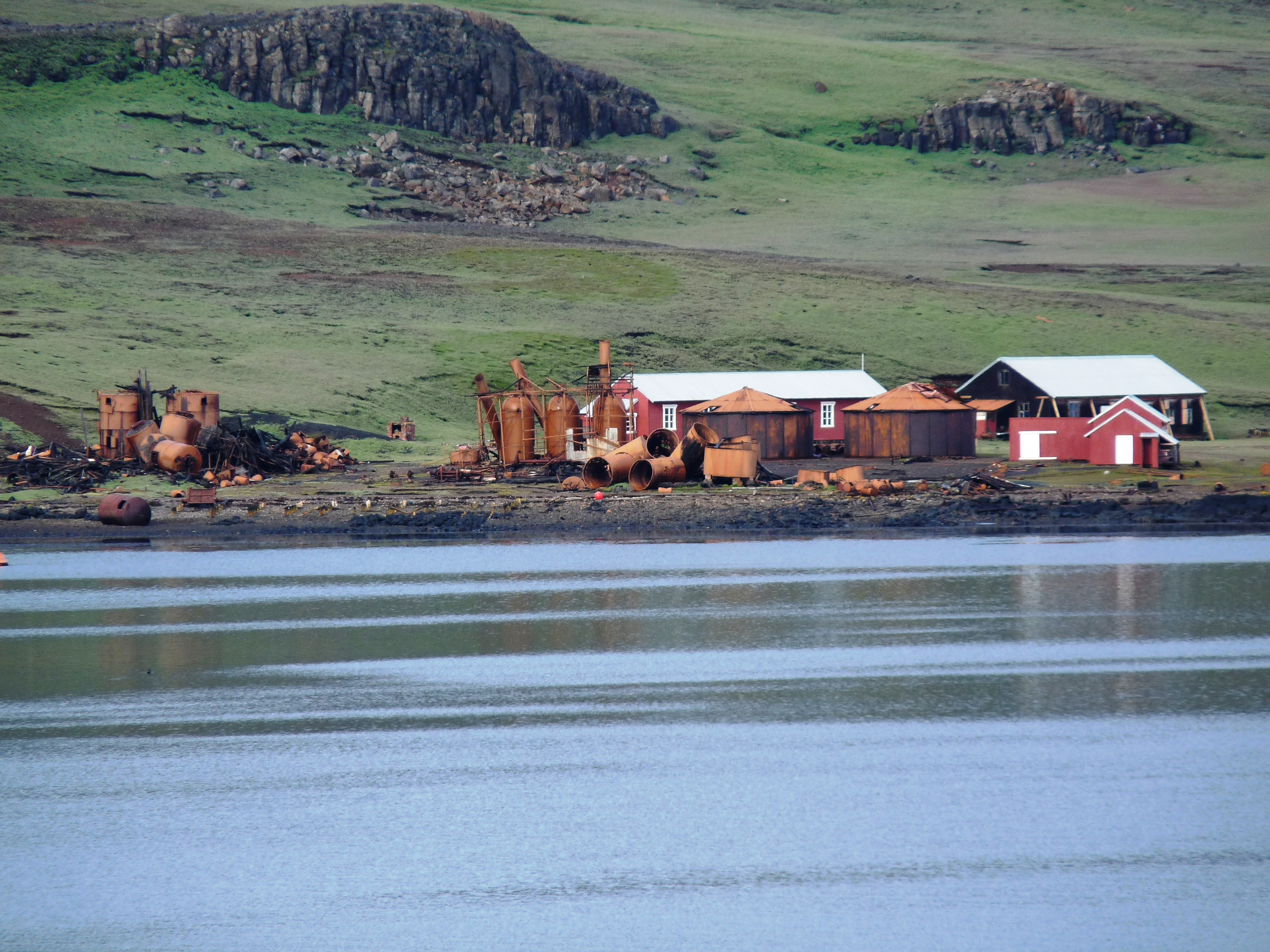
- View from the sea

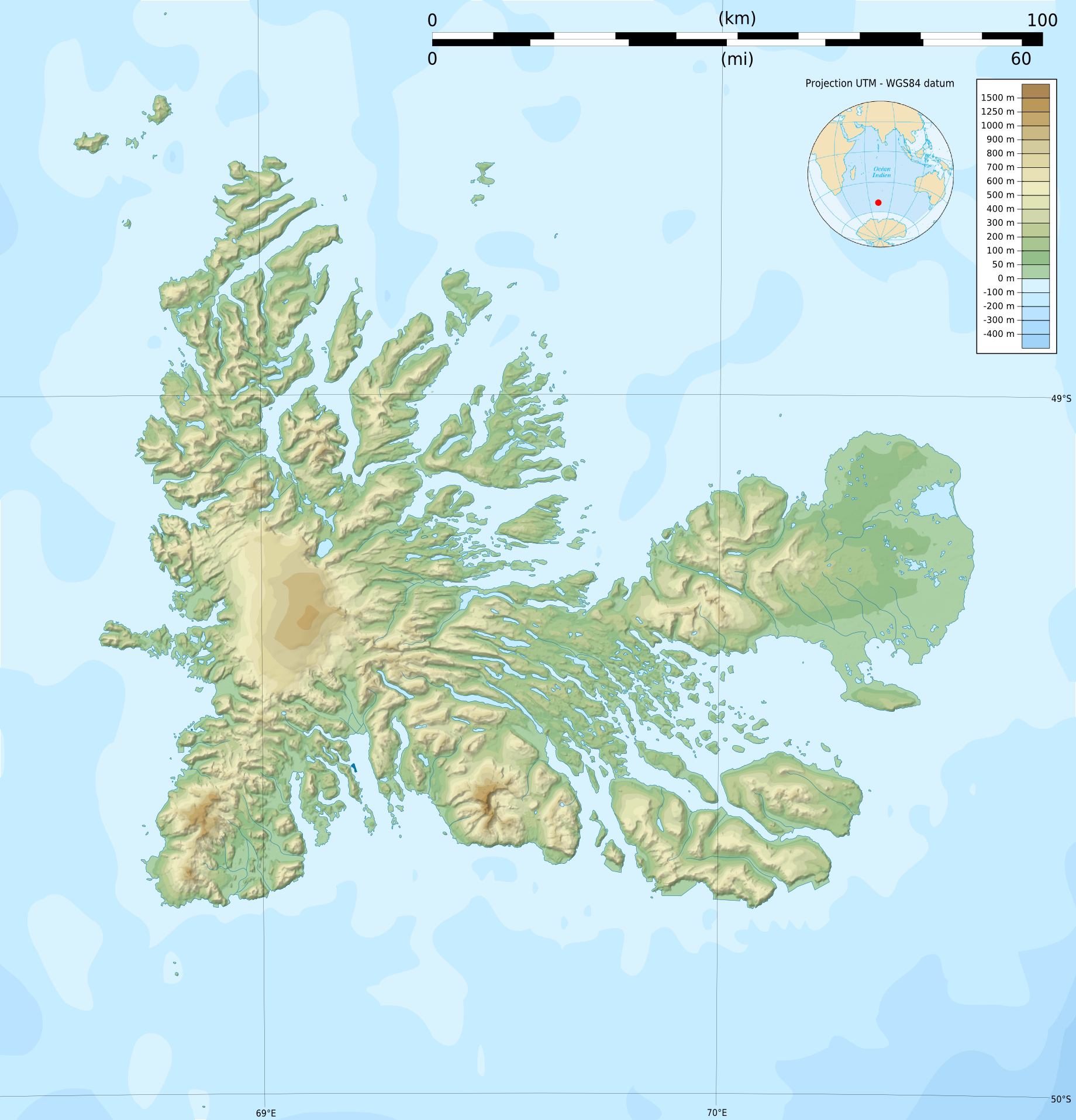
- Location in Kerguelen
- Coordinates: 49°33′16″S 69°49′22″E
- Country: France
- Territory: TAAF
- District: Kerguelen Islands
- Established: 1906
- Elevation: 3 m (9.8 ft)

Population (2025)
  - Total: 0
- Time zone: UTC+6
- Abandoned: 1926

Port Jeanne d'Arc (French pronunciation: [pɔʁ ʒan daʁk]) is a former whaling station in the Kerguelen Islands, French Southern and Antarctic Lands, Southern Indian Ocean.

The settlement was located by the northern shore of the Jeanne d'Arc Peninsula opposite Île Longue and a little east of the isthmus that links it to Grande Terre. There are remains of the abandoned buildings of the station, as well as other facilities, including a graveyard and a railway. Currently there is a project to renovate the buildings owing to their historical significance.

== History ==
The name was given in 1908 by the Anglo-Norwegian company Storm & Bull from Cape Town. Naming it after a French historical figure had been a gesture of goodwill and appreciation towards brothers Henry and René-Émile Bossière, who had granted the concession to build the whaling station. The company gave the same name to the vessel that was going to ship the supplies for the construction of the station. Roughly 300 Norwegian construction workers succeeded in building the main facilities of the station in only 3 months. It is estimated that around 460 tons of fir wood and 2,500 tons of steel were needed to build the site.

By 1909 the production of whale oil began, employing around a hundred mostly Norwegian workers and supervisors throughout the year. The best year was in 1908 when 232 whales were caught and a total of 13,760 barrels of oil were produced. Altogether, the profitability of whaling at Port Jeanne d'Arc was short lived, as whale stocks in the waters surrounding Kerguelen were limited. Whaling lasted barely three seasons, with elephant seals being hunted in 1912 to enable the oil quota to be reached. In 1914, following the onset of World War I, the few inhabitants of Kerguelen feared that navigation would be disrupted and that it would be difficult for them to get the necessary supplies for their outposts. Thus the personnel of Port Jeanne d'Arc whaling station, as well as the shepherds of Port Couvreux, a small settlement to the northwest, were evacuated by a vessel that was chartered for the purpose.

After an interruption lasting over five years, the activity at Port Jeanne d'Arc was resumed in 1919 and the venture was bought by the Cape Town-based company Irwin & Johnson. The whaling station remained in operation until 1926, when production came to an end following the introduction of factory ships and the overhunting of whales and elephant seals that led to their near extinction in that area.

== See also ==
- Port Couvreux
