= Port Couvreux =

- Abandoned village
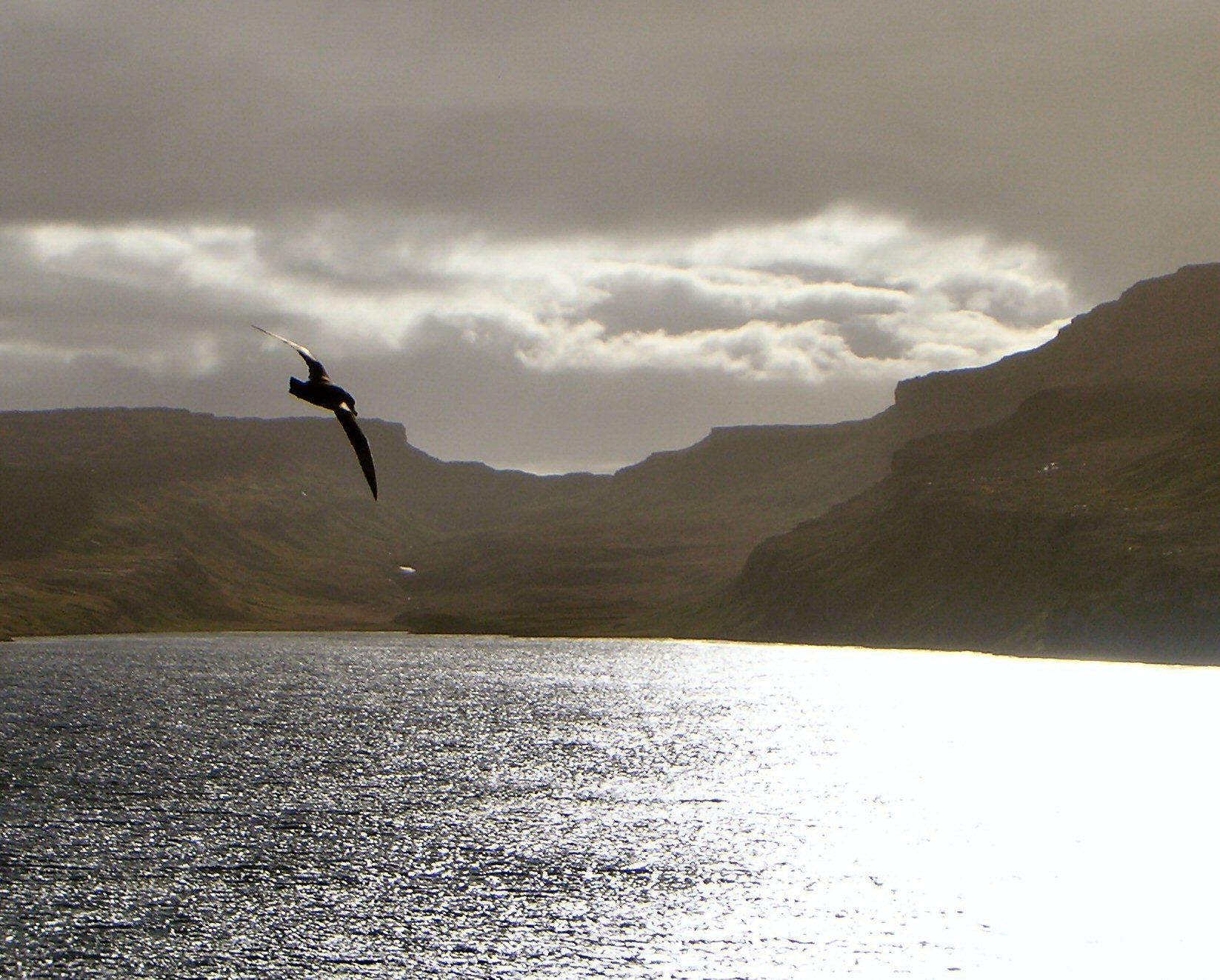
- Port-Couvreux; panorama of the bay

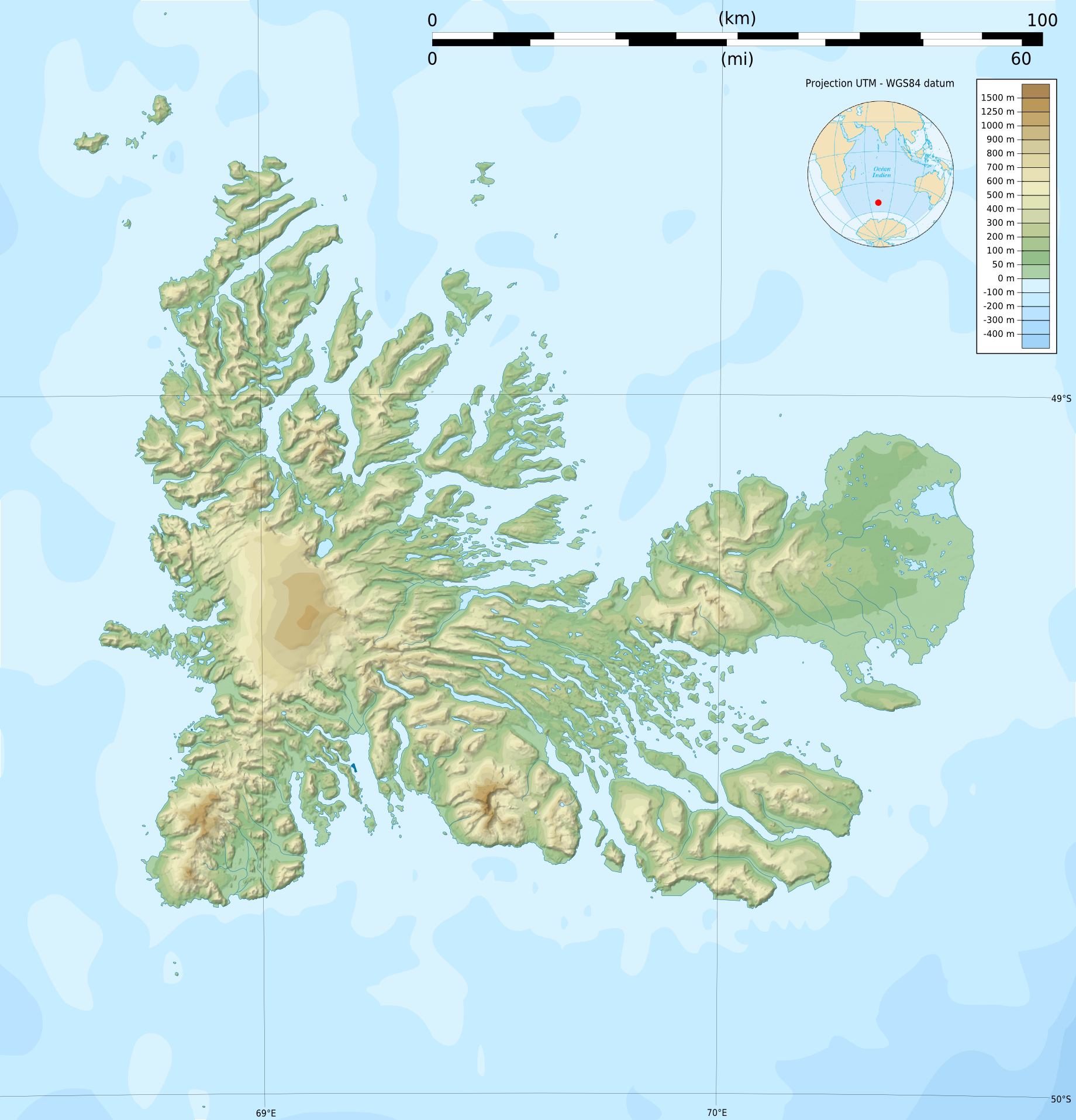
- Location in Kerguelen
- Coordinates: 49°16′49″S 69°41′19″E
- Country: France
- Territory: TAAF
- District: Kerguelen Islands
- Established: 1912
- Elevation: 11 m (36 ft)

Population (2025)
  - Total: 0
- Time zone: UTC+6
- Abandoned: 1931

Port Couvreux (French pronunciation: [pɔʁ kuvʁø]) was a settlement of the Kerguelen Islands, French Southern and Antarctic Lands, Southern Indian Ocean, France.

The village was located at the head of Hillsborough Bay, in the innermost part of the Baleiniers Gulf. There are still remains of some of the abandoned buildings of the failed venture, including a small graveyard.

Despite being among the most isolated places on Earth, the Kerguelen Islands remain a French territory, inhabited by a small population of French citizens.

== History ==
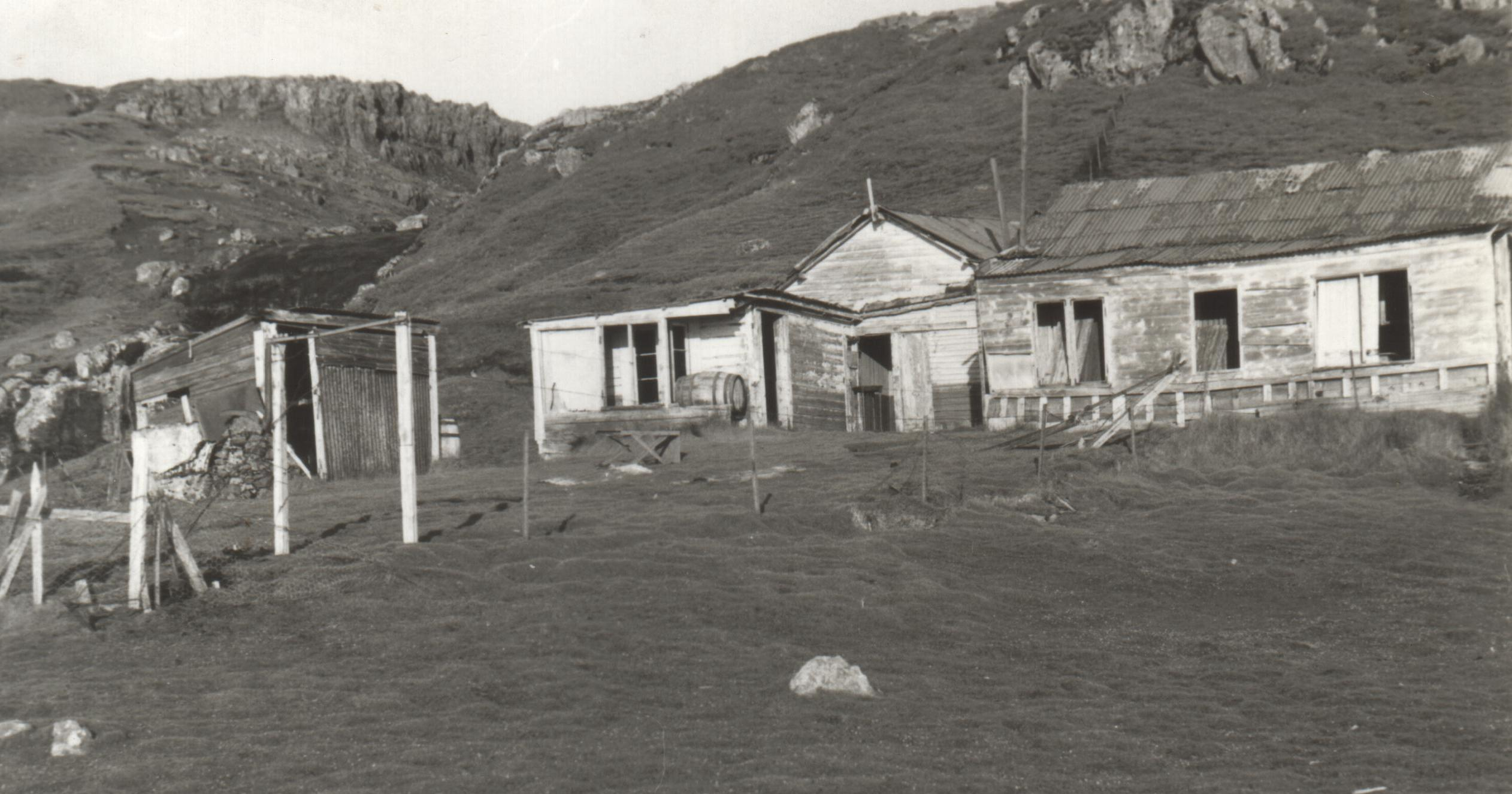
Abandoned buildings in 1983.

Port Couvreux was part of an attempt to settle a permanent population in Kerguelen, in a similar manner as had been done in the Falkland Islands by the British. The village was officially founded in 1912.

The name was given by the French Naval Hydrographic and Oceanographic Service in 1915 to refer to the facilities built by brothers Henry and René-Émile Bossière at the site. It was named in honor of Abel Couvreux, main sponsor of the Bossière brothers first expedition, and later president of the Compagnie Generale des Iles Kerguelen, Saint Paul & Amsterdam.

Beginning in 1893, the Bossière brothers studied the feasibility of raising sheep in Kerguelen, a place with a similar climate as the Falklands. Their ultimate goal was to establish a permanent human settlement in the remote and uninhabited island. Eventually they were granted a 50-year concession from the government of France. However, the project would be marred by delays and lack of decision-making. Years passed and in 1907 a French official note stated:

In fact , from 31 July 1893 to January 1907, not one of M. Bossière's business projects has been realised, not a man, not a parcel has been unloaded at Kerguelen, which today is still unexplored and uninhabited'.

At last in 1908-1909 Henry Bossière led a preliminary reconnaissance expedition. In 1912, Baron Pierre Decouz was given the task to determine the best site for founding a settlement and he chose Port Couvreux. He brought some sheep from Durban and made the first wintering in the place. In 1913 René Bossière sailed to the Falkland Islands and bought 1,600 sheep, embarking them on his ship. He arrived to Kerguelen on the 16 August, after having braved very rough seas. The ship was two months behind schedule and most of the sheep died during the difficult journey. A temporary shelter was built in Port-Couvreux for the three shepherds who would take care of the surviving 600 sheep that were brought to land, and the ship left towards Australia.

One year later, following the onset of World War I, the few inhabitants of Kerguelen feared that navigation would be disrupted and that it would be difficult for them to get the necessary supplies for their outposts. Thus the shepherds of Port Couvreux, as well as the Norwegians that were at Port Jeanne d'Arc whaling station in the southeast of Kerguelen, were evacuated by a vessel that was chartered for the purpose. Meanwhile the flocks of sheep were left on the island, in the hope that they would fend for themselves. The war ended in 1918, but it wasn't until 1920 that René Bossière visited Port Couvreux again, only to find that all the sheep had died and that the buildings were in a bad state of disrepair. Bossière decided to renovate the buildings in order to make them habitable and to leave three shepherds with a flock of fifty sheep as well as some pigs.

Between 1920 and 1927 the Bossière brothers made a series of trips to Kerguelen, bringing more shepherds and new animals in order to make up for the relatively high mortality. In 1927 there was a new attempt at populating the village and three families from Le Havre, with their children, were brought to the place. But sheep rearing proved itself too difficult owing to the lack of pasture in the surrounding slopes. Some of the inhabitants died, and in 1931 the survivors were evacuated. No new attempt was made to bring settlers to the abandoned station and the permission that the Bossière brothers had to establish settlements in Kerguelen was revoked by the French authorities in 1937.

== See also ==
- Port-Christmas
