= Benedicta Margaretha von Löwendal =

German businessperson

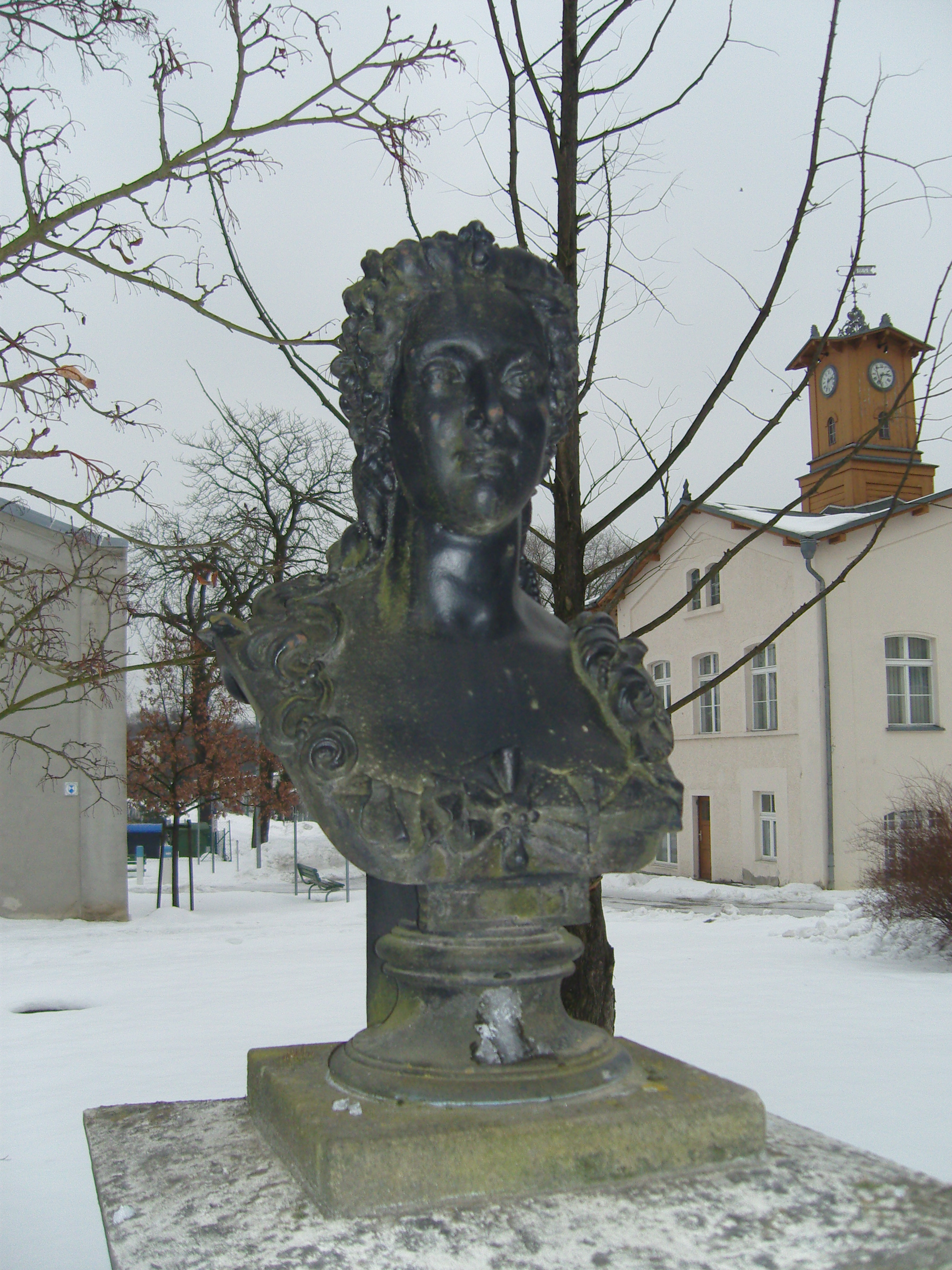
A bust of Benedicta Margaretha von Löwendal in Lauchhammer, Germany

Benedicta Margaretha von Löwendal (1683-1776), was a German business person. She founded and managed iron works on her estate Mückenberg from 1725 until 1776 and became the greatest entrepreneur in Niederlausitz. A street and a college in Lauchhammer, the Freifrau-von-Löwendal-Gymnasium, were named after her.
