= Welzow =

Welzow Wjelcej
- Town
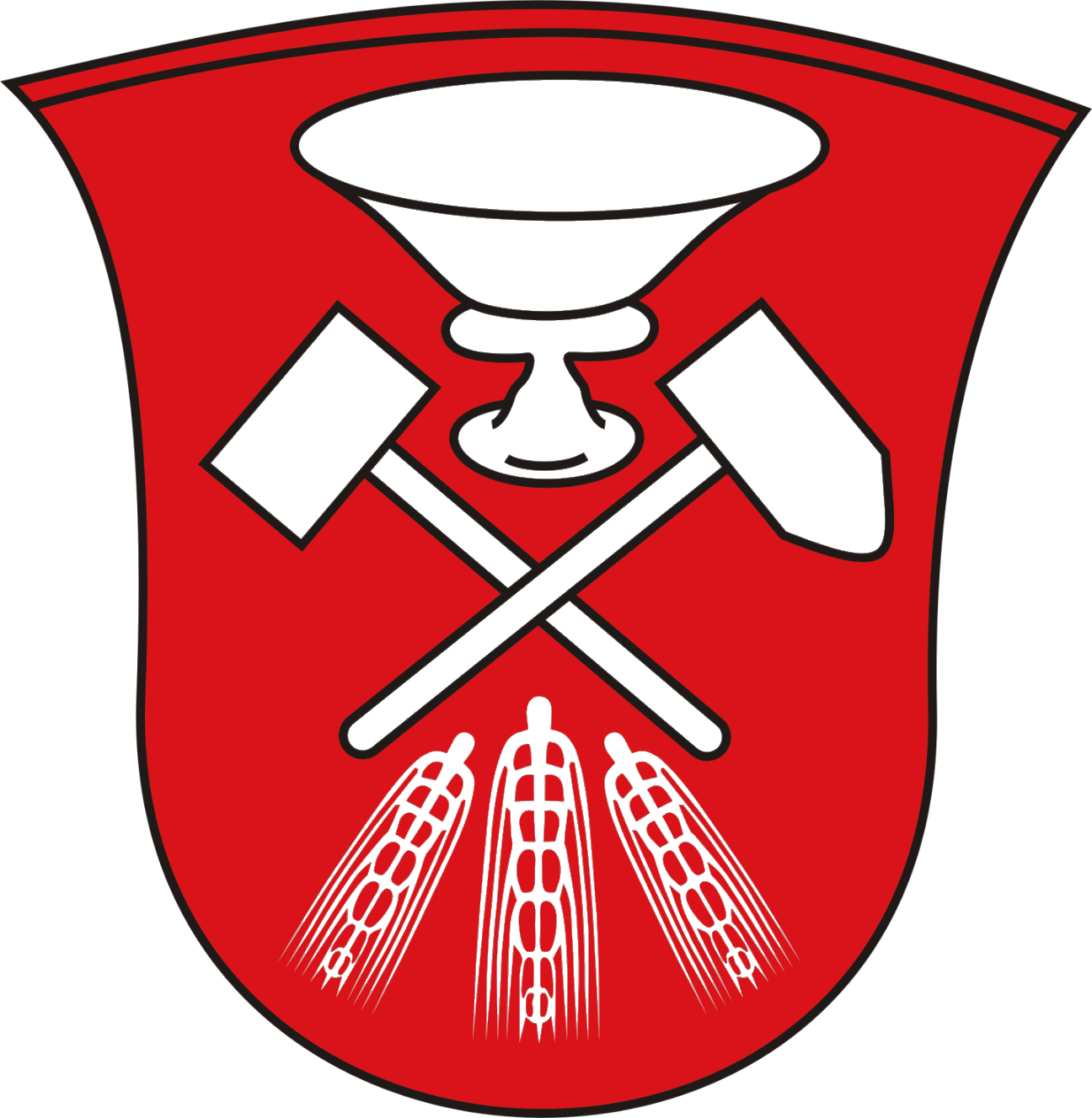
- Flag Coat of arms

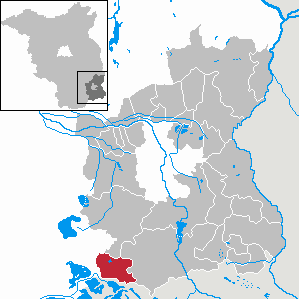
- Location of Welzow within Spree-Neiße district
- Interactive map of Welzow
- Location within Germany Location within Brandenburg
- Coordinates: 51°34′00″N 14°10′59″E
- Country: Germany
- State: Brandenburg
- District: Spree-Neiße

Government
  - Mayor (2017–25): Birgit Zuchold (SPD)

Area
  - Total: 39.57 km^{2} (15.28 sq mi)
- Elevation: 121 m (397 ft)

Population (2025-12-31)
  - Total: 3,126
  - Density: 79.00/km^{2} (204.6/sq mi)
- Time zone: UTC+01:00 (CET)
  - Summer (DST): UTC+02:00 (CEST)
- Postal codes: 03119
- Dialling codes: 035751
- Vehicle registration: SPN
- Website: www.welzow.de

Welzow (German pronunciation: [ˈvɛltsoː]; Lower Sorbian: Wjelcej) is a town in the district of Spree-Neiße, in southeastern Brandenburg, Germany. It is situated 16 km northwest of Hoyerswerda, and 23 km southwest of Cottbus.

== Demography ==
Development of population since 1875 within the current Boundaries (Blue Line: Population; Dotted Line: Comparison to Population development in Brandenburg state; Grey Background: Time of Nazi Germany; Red Background: Time of communist East Germany)

Recent Population Development and Projections (Population Development before Census 2011 (blue line); Recent Population Development according to the Census in Germany in 2011 (blue bordered line); Official projections for 2005-2030 (yellow line); for 2017-2030 (scarlet line); for 2020-2030 (green line)

Welzow: Population development
within the current boundaries (2020)

Year	Pop.	±% p.a.
1875	630	—
1890	684	+0.55%
1910	5,549	+11.03%
1925	6,962	+1.52%
1939	7,815	+0.83%
1950	8,235	+0.48%
1964	7,685	−0.49%

Year	Pop.	±% p.a.
1971	7,481	−0.38%
1981	6,277	−1.74%
1985	6,354	+0.31%
1990	5,602	−2.49%
1995	5,071	−1.97%
2000	4,838	−0.94%
2005	4,183	−2.87%

Year	Pop.	±% p.a.
2010	3,806	−1.87%
2015	3,645	−0.86%
2016	3,552	−2.55%
2017	3,490	−1.75%
2018	3,418	−2.06%
2019	3,384	−0.99%
2020	3,317	−1.98%
