= Takraf GmbH =

German industrial company

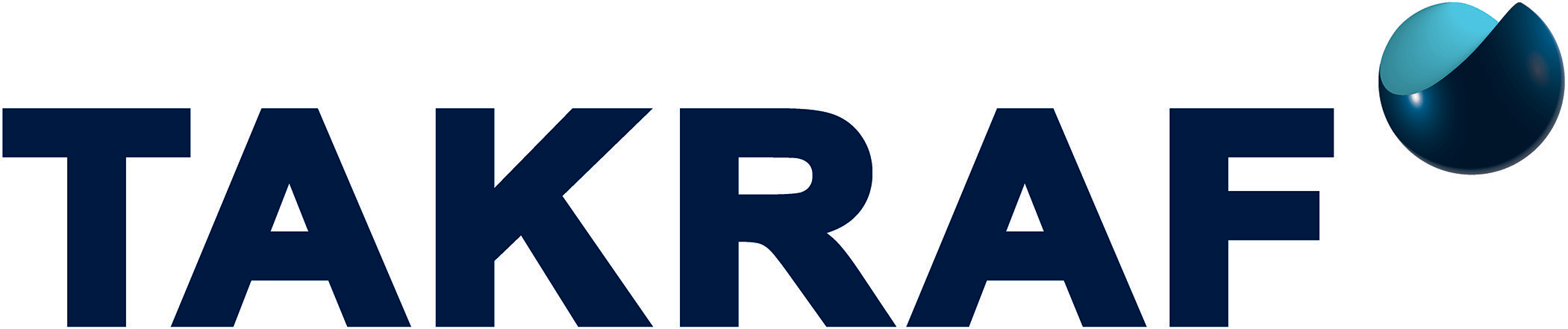
- Type: GmbH - Private Company
- Industry: Systems and equipment for mining and associated industries
- Founded: 1948
- Headquarters: Leipzig, Germany
- Area served: Worldwide
- Key people: Thomas Jabs (CEO); Massimo Valsecchi (CFO)
- Products: Mining Systems & Equipment; Bulk Material Handling; Minerals Processing; Liquid Solid Separation; Services & Components; Dry Stack Tailings (DST) Management; In Pit Crushing & Conveying (IPCC)
- Number of employees: ~1,000 (2023)
- Subsidiaries: offices in 22 locations in 13 countries; 3 global competence centers; In-house fabrication capabilities
- Website: takraf.com

TAKRAF Group (“TAKRAF”), is a global German industrial company. Through its brands, TAKRAF and DELKOR, the Group provides equipment, systems and services to the mining and associated industries.

The TAKRAF portfolio covers high-capacity run-of-mine and bulk material handling from overburden removal, to raw material extraction, comminution, conveying, loading/unloading, processing, homogenizing, blending and storage to final loading for onward shipment. TAKRAF has supplied the most powerful conveying system in the world.

== History ==
While the official foundation date of TAKRAF Group is given as 1948, its origins stretch back to 1725 when the Lauchhammer works for fabricating construction equipment were established, in then Prussia, together with the first blast furnace for producing iron.

The 19th century saw, in 1809, the start of activities as a mechanical engineering company, as well as major milestones being contributed to Germany’s industrial history. These included, in 1874, the Lauchhammer works commencing high-rise and iron bridge construction in Oberhammer, and the start of fabrication of overburden and lignite mining equipment.

The Lauchhammer works continued to contribute important firsts into the 20th century. The first overburden conveyor bridge was supplied in 1924, followed, two years later, in 1926, by fabrication of the first three bucket-wheel excavators.

The years following the foundation of TAKRAF, then known as ABUS, in 1948 saw supply of the first 60 meter moveable overburden conveyor bridge for the Welzon Sued lignite mine in 1973. This was followed by the construction of four other similar conveyor bridges prior to 1991, when the world’s largest bridge complex, the 60 m overburden conveyor bridge in the Klettwitz-Nord opencast mine was commissioned. The bridge (Visitor Mine “F 60 Lichterfeld”) is open for visitors at the Internationale Bauausstellung Fürst-Pückler-Land (International Mining Exhibition Fürst-Pückler-Land).

In 1990, the 500th bucket-wheel excavator was supplied. Large scale equipment developed for on-off heap leach technology for copper ore in 1994. In 1998, large, customized gearboxes for bucket-wheel drive gearboxes were developed while, in 2000, the longest conveyor for its time was supplied. In 2006, the first TAKRAF mobile conveyor bridges for stacking and reclaiming were developed and supplied.

Renamed as TAKRAF GmbH in 2006, it was, 1 year later, acquired by the international Techint Group, operating within Tenova SpA under the brand name Tenova TAKRAF. TAKRAF is short for Tagebergbau-Ausrüstungen, Krane und Förderanlagen (surface mining equipment, cranes and conveying equipment).

2010 and the years following saw the development of the first TAKRAF mobile crushing plant, the double-roll crusher for oil sands and sizer technology, including the X-TREME class sizer range for hard rock processing. The integration, in 2014, of DELKOR, specialising in mineral processing, added liquid/solid separation and wet processing capabilities to the product line.

A contract for the world’s most powerful conveyor system was awarded in 2015, a project which features the application of gearless drive conveyor (GDC) technology as well as a number of other innovations.

In 2017, High Pressure Grinding Roll (HPGR) technology was developed for specific comminution requirements and, in 2020, the MAXGen mechanism was incorporated within the DELKOR BQR Flotation Cell to optimize metallurgical performance.

Following a rebranding in 2020, simply calling itself TAKRAF Group, the entity has continued to establish important milestones across the globe, including supply of the first Dry Stack Tailings (DST) system, for the environmentally friendly and safe disposal of tailings, to Brazil. In the same year, 2021, TAKRAF supplied its first maintenance cart to a USA operation. The maintenance cart was provided as part of a crusher relocation project on a copper mine to facilitate the safe and efficient replacement of idlers on a steep 26 % downhill conveyor.

In 2022, the first TAKRAF Sizers to be supplied into the India market were ordered by a major global steel producer, while 2023 saw the award of one of the largest single orders in the Group’s history. The contract covers the design, fabrication and delivery of an advanced and integrated IPCC (In-Pit Crushing & Conveying) and material handling system for the Simandou iron ore complex in Guinea.

The entity is headquartered in Leipzig, Germany and has several representations worldwide, including global competence, fabrication and research & development facilities.

== Product and Service Centers ==
TAKRAF Group has Product and Service Centers in Lauchhammer, Germany and Bengaluru, India, both of which include in-house fabrication facilities and are located close to major international transport routes to facilitate dispatch of fabricated components and equipment worldwide.

With a covered production area of 4,000 m^{2} and crane capacities of up to 60 t, the Lauchhammer Center is dedicated to engineering, fabrication and testing of TAKRAF’s comminution products and high-value mechanical components for mining equipment including spare and wear parts. The in-house minerals laboratory is equipped to conduct material tests to determine factors such as crushability and abrasiveness, while technology to increase the wear life of critical parts is continuously developed. The facilities are certified for compliance with relevant ISO quality (9001:2015; 14001:2015) and ISO 45001:2018 occupational safety, health and environmental protection standards. The Bengaluru Center focuses on engineering and fabrication of DELKOR liquid/solid separation products, as well as a variety of metal and mineral processing equipment. The facility comprises more than 10,000 m^{2} of covered space and is fully equipped with cranes ranging from 2 t to 25 t. The facility is certified for ISO 9001:2015 compliance.

== Projects ==
=== Utkal flight conveyor ===
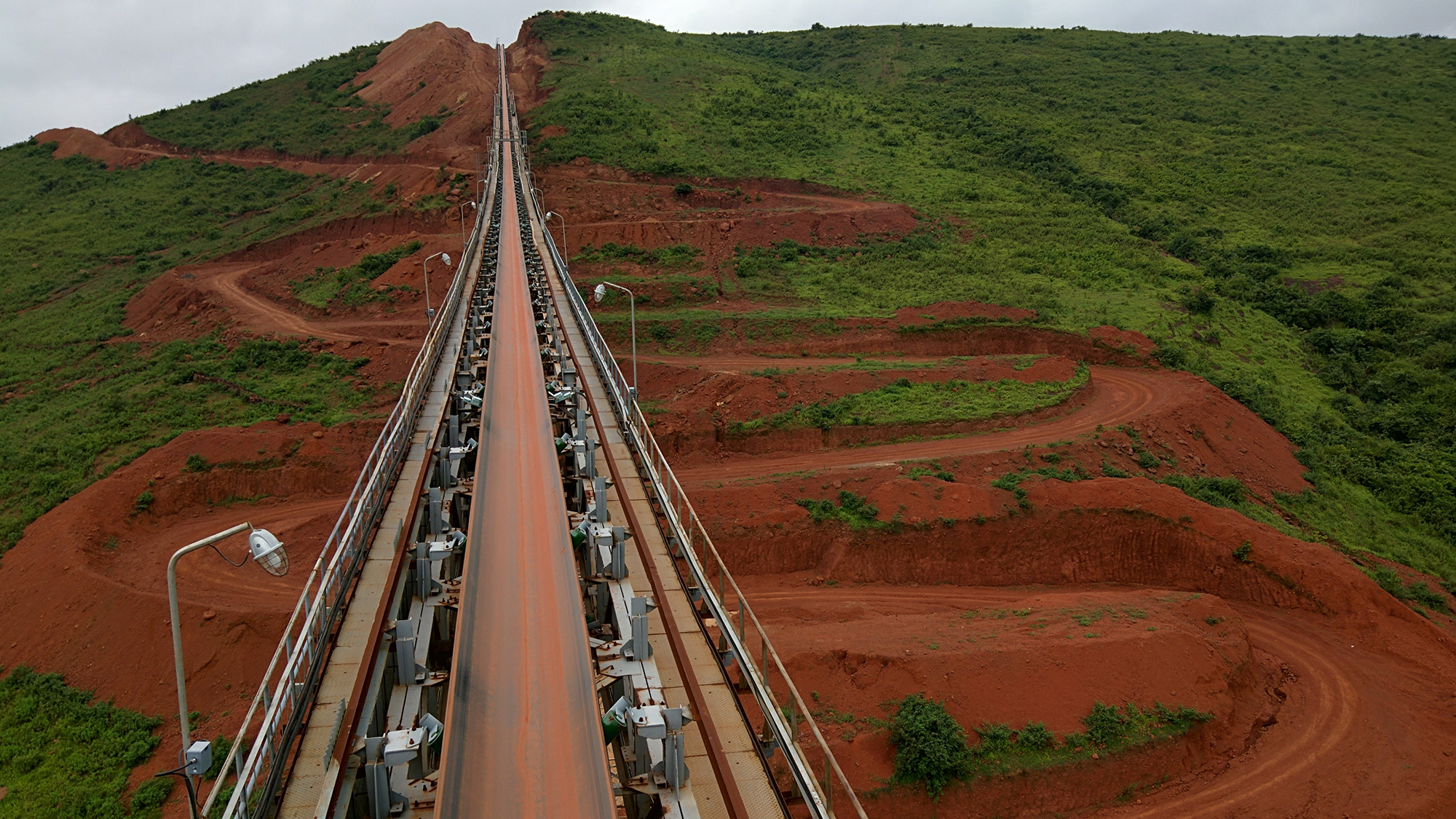
TAKRAF Overland Conveyor - longest single flight conveyor in India

A contract for an approximately 19 km overland conveyor system was awarded for the greenfield Utkal Alumina project in Tikri, Raigada. It included the longest single flight conveyor system to be installed to date within Indian territory. The overland conveyor system transports bauxite from the mines to a 4.5 mtpa alumina plant, and traverses highly undulating topography over almost its entire route.

As a result of the topography and due to the conveyor length, the conveyors were designed with head and tail drives, and multiple, very tight compound horizontal and vertical curves. With an installed power of 6 x 850 kW and 2 x 850 kW, the conveyor system features 6 drives at the tail end and 4 at the head end on the longer conveyor, while the shorter conveyor has 2 drives at the head end only. Each conveyor features a fail-safe hydraulic disc brake at the tail end. A take-up winch with capstan brake arrangement has been provided at the head end of both conveyors.

The intermediate transfer point between the 2 conveyors is located in hilly terrain and, since the 4 head end drives of the longer conveyor are also located here, the conveyor drive and take-up area are mounted on a portal steel structure. These lightweight but high strength structures provide the design flexibility to accommodate the terrain.

To facilitate maintenance, approach roads and a mine road were made available along the entire conveyor length, with cage ladders provided on the elevated structures enabling ease of access.

=== Flotation Technology ===
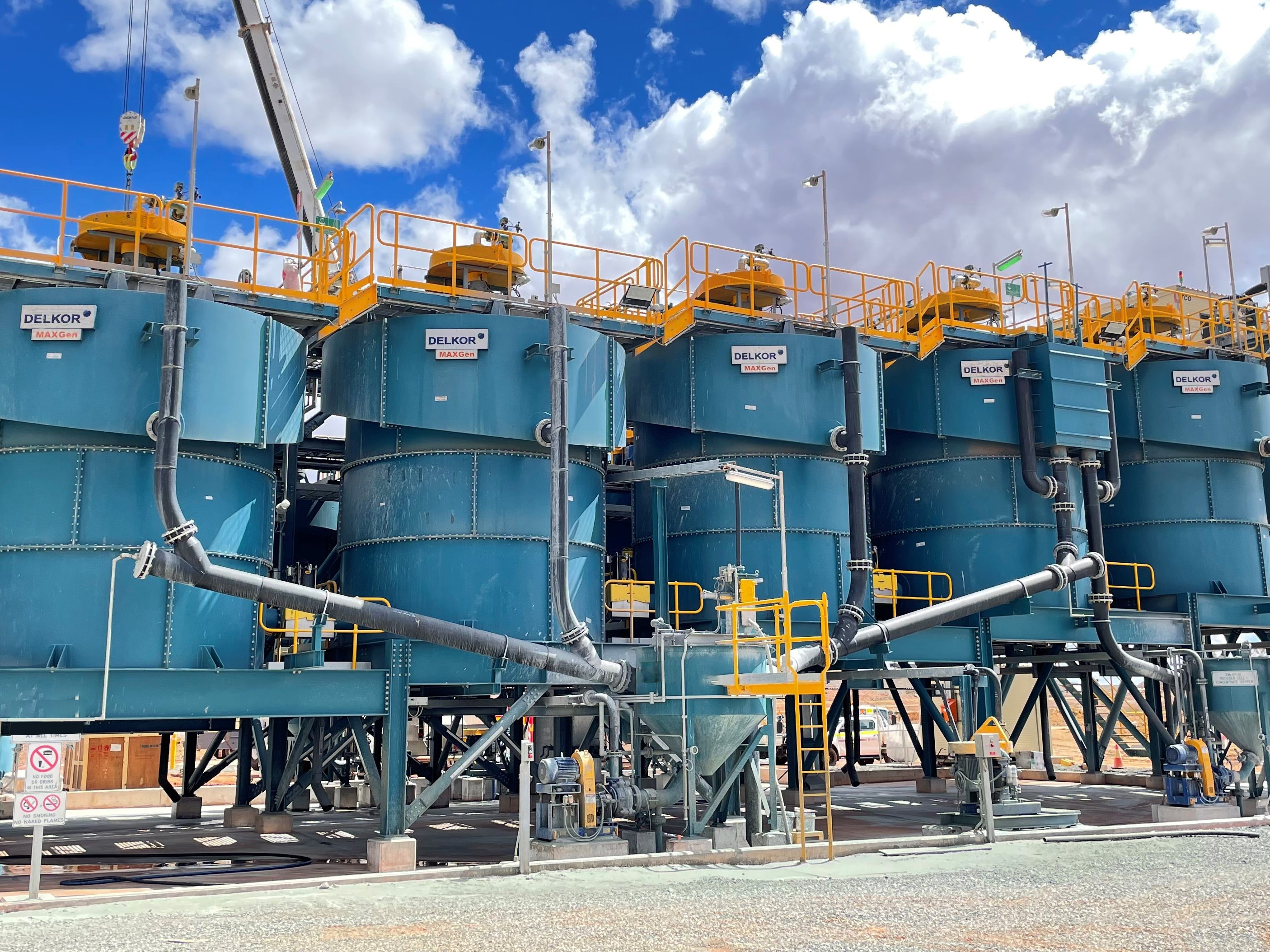
DELKOR new generation BQR Flotation Cells MAXGen

The new generation DELKOR BQR Flotation Cell, which is equipped with the proprietary MAXGen mechanism, was developed to enhance metallurgical performance with a view to increasing the sustainable recovery of minerals, combined with greater ease of maintenance and lower cost of ownership.

DELKOR BQR cells are used in roughing, scavenging, cleaning and re-cleaning applications to process copper, zinc, Platinum Group Metals (PGMs), phosphates, graphite, slag and effluents.

In its first commercial application, the cell was applied to maximize limestone recovery for one of India’s leading manufacturers and suppliers of cement, enabling some 50% recovery of the limestone from the tailings. Following the success of this first commercial application, the cell is being applied across a range of commodities. Example applications include processing fluorspar at a Spanish operation and for iron ore recovery at plants in Honduras and South Africa, as well as installations at two gold mines and a nickel restart project in Australia.

== Maintenance ==
TAKRAF Group's business areas include equipment maintenance. This includes both incorporating features in equipment with the stated goal of improving maintainability, and manufacturing specialist mining maintenance equipment.

=== In-pit crushing and conveying (IPCC) systems ===
TAKRAF’s IPCC system comprises in-pit crushing stations, incorporating the TAKRAF Sizer and roll crusher equipment, connected to a network of conveyors and spreaders or stackers, with each component designed for ease of maintainability.

=== Maintenance cart ===
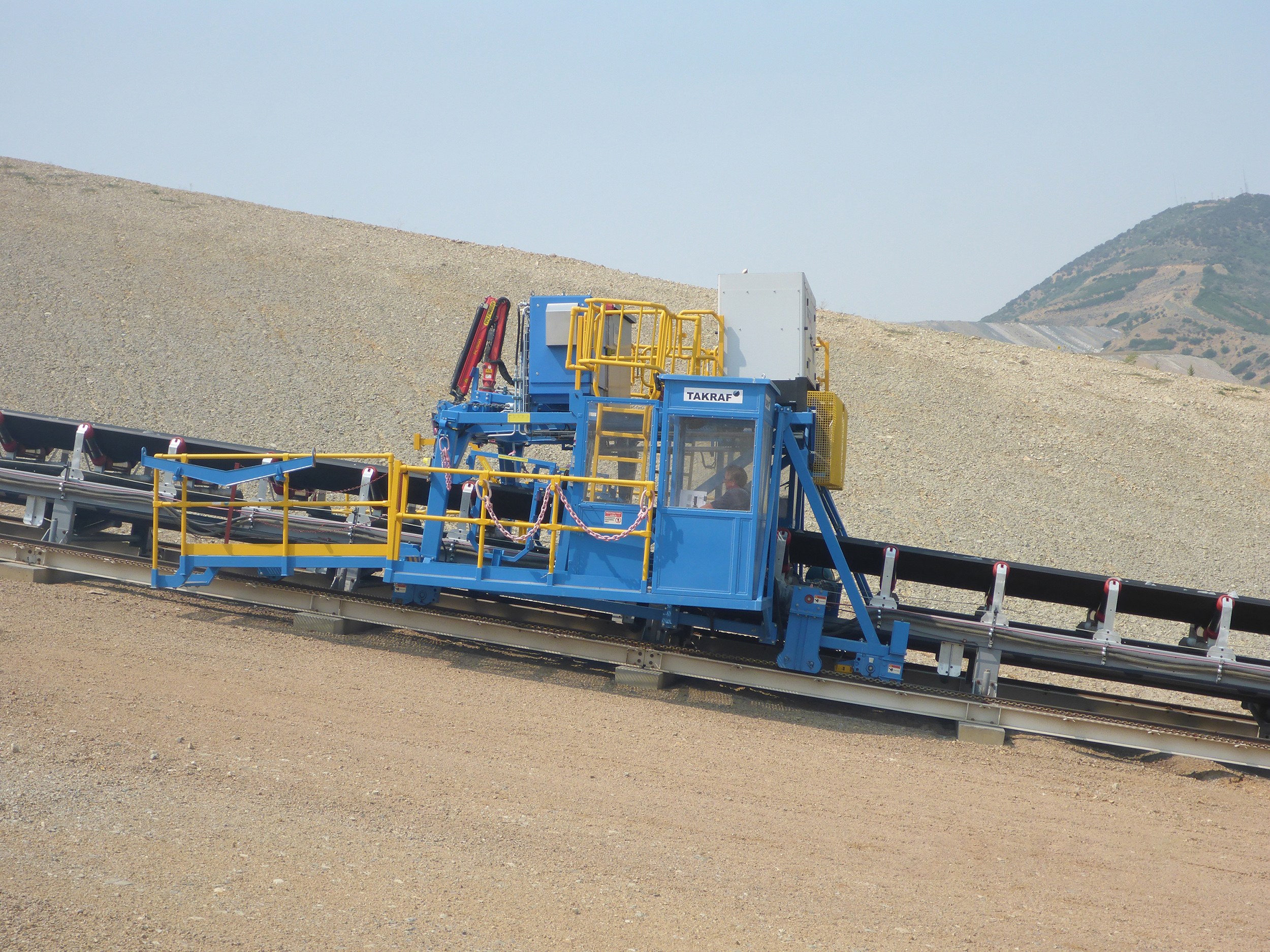
TAKRAF Maintenance Cart servicing a 26 % decline section in the US

Conducting maintenance on belt conveyors involves the replacement of worn or damaged idlers, work that is especially challenging on the steep slopes, in tunnels or on the elevated structures so typical of mining sites.

TAKRAF’s maintenance cart was therefore developed to protect the safety of personnel and for the efficient replacement of idlers by being able to access any location along a conveyor belt. The replacement of idlers in both the top and return strand of a belt conveyor is possible in less than 15 minutes, as the cart is fitted with a belt lifting device that lifts the belt away from the idler to be replaced.

A maintenance cart at a major copper project in North America services a 4,350 m overland conveyor with more than 13,000 rolls, of which a steep, 26 % decline section, 1,250 m in length, boasts more than 3,700 rolls.

=== TAKRAF Automatic Belt Training System (ABTS) ===
Tube (also referred to as pipe) conveyors are prone to belt twisting, which, in a worst-case scenario, leads to conveyor collapse. In addition, the belt overlap, where the tube belt opens to discharge the material, needs to be precisely controlled and, if necessary, adjusted for accurate and efficient operation.

As a result, TAKRAF developed the ABTS, a patented measurement, control and training device for ensuring the correct overlap position at the discharge area of a tube conveyor. The system has been fitted to a variety of global TAKRAF tube conveyor installations. The ABTS automatically determines the belt overlap position via ultrasonic sensors. If the overlap exceeds the tolerance limit, servomotors are activated that rotate the tube profile through individual idlers into the desired position via targeted tilting adjustments.

== Known products ==
- Type Es 3750 bucket chain excavator
- Type ERs 500 bucket chain excavator
- Type ERs (K) 800 bucket chain excavator
- Type SRs 8000 bucket-wheel excavator
- Type SRs 2000 bucket-wheel excavator
- Type SRs(H) 1050.23/2.0 compact bucket-wheel excavator
- Overburden Conveyor Bridge F60

== See also ==
- Overburden Conveyor Bridge F60
- Lauchhammer works
