= Alphonse Couvreux =

French Inventor

- Born: 1820
- Died: July 1890 (aged 69–70)
- Citizenship: France
- Occupations: Inventor, Entrepreneur
- Known for: Bucket chain excavator, Suez Canal

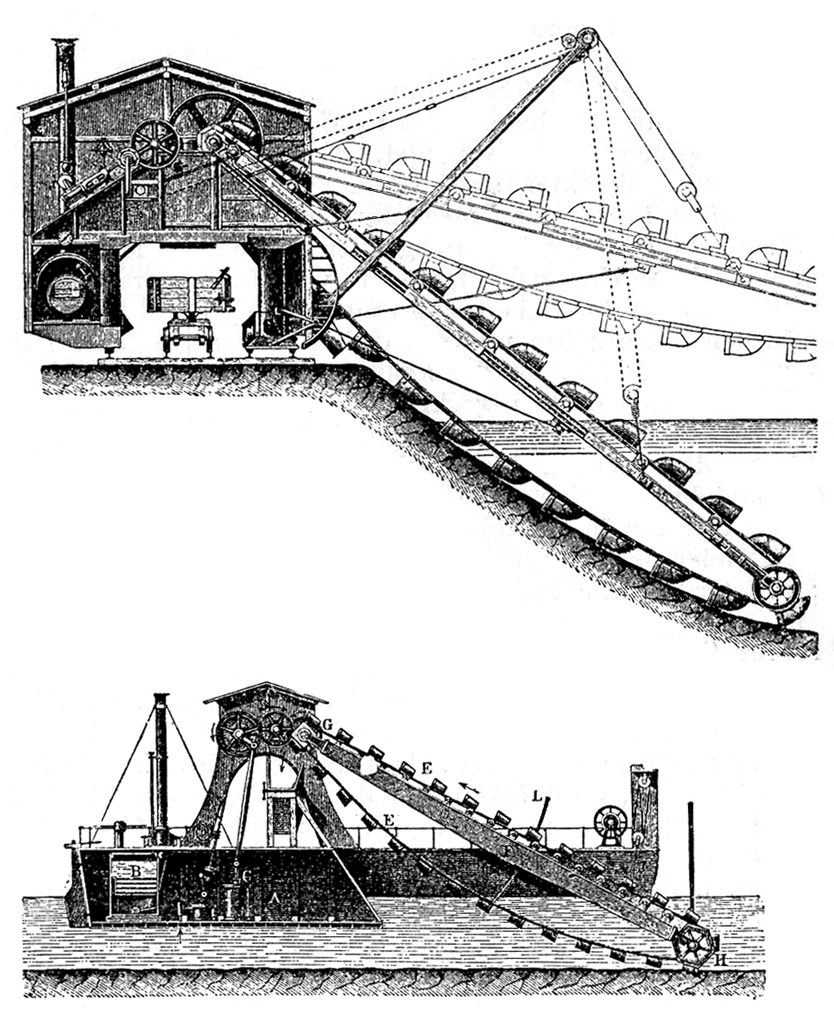
A bucket chain excavator

Alphonse Couvreux (1820 – July 1890) was a French public works contractor, known for inventing the bucket chain excavator for which he filed a patent in May 1860.

The bucket chain excavator was used to remove great amounts of earth for the construction of railroads and the Suez Canal. The first documented use of the machine on land was in 1859. Couvreux used some of his machines to excavate material for the Ardennes Railroad. About 8 million cubic yards of material was excavated from the Suez Canal by seven of his machines during a portion of its construction from 1863 to 1868. Some of Couvreux's machines were used in the early failed French attempt to build the Panama Canal. The bucket chain excavator is still used in open pit mines and quarries. A scale model of one of his 1859 machines is located in the Museum of Arts and Trades in Paris.

== Other sources ==
- Brochure De l'inventeur à l'entrepreneur, histoire de brevets, Musée des Arts et Métiers (Paris), 2008.
- Bulletin de l’Association des anciens élèves de l’École supérieure de commerce de Paris. N°90, July 1890, pp. 109–110.
