= Lichterfeld-Schacksdorf =

- Municipality
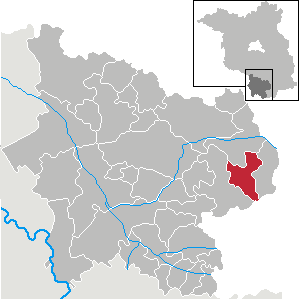
- Location of Lichterfeld-Schacksdorf within Elbe-Elster district
- Interactive map of Lichterfeld-Schacksdorf
- Location within Germany Location within Brandenburg
- Coordinates: 51°36′00″N 13°46′00″E
- Country: Germany
- State: Brandenburg
- District: Elbe-Elster
- Municipal assoc.: Kleine Elster (Niederlausitz)
- Subdivisions: 3 Ortsteile

Government
  - Mayor (2024–29): Christoph Drangosch

Area
  - Total: 40.78 km^{2} (15.75 sq mi)
- Elevation: 117 m (384 ft)

Population (2025-12-31)
  - Total: 913
  - Density: 22.4/km^{2} (58.0/sq mi)
- Time zone: UTC+01:00 (CET)
  - Summer (DST): UTC+02:00 (CEST)
- Postal codes: 03238
- Dialling codes: 03531
- Vehicle registration: EE, FI, LIB

Lichterfeld-Schacksdorf (Lower Sorbian: Swětłe-Šachlejce) is a municipality in the Elbe-Elster district, in Lower Lusatia, Brandenburg, Germany.

== History ==
From 1815 to 1947, the constituent localities of Lichterfeld-Schacksdorf (Lichterfeld, Schacksdorf and Lieskau) were part of the Prussian Province of Brandenburg. From 1952 to 1990, they were part of the Bezirk Cottbus of East Germany. On 31 December 1997, the municipality of Lichterfeld-Schacksdorf was formed by merging the municipalities of Lichterfeld and Schacksdorf. On 31 December 1998, the municipality of Lieskau was merged into it.

== Demography ==
Development of Population since 1875 within the Current Boundaries (Blue Line: Population; Dotted Line: Comparison to Population Development of Brandenburg state; Grey Background: Time of Nazi rule; Red Background: Time of Communist rule)

Lichterfeld-Schacksdorf: Population development within the current boundaries (2013)

| Year | Population |
|---|---|
| 1875 | 934 |
| 1890 | 1 005 |
| 1910 | 1 262 |
| 1925 | 1 208 |
| 1933 | 1 172 |
| 1939 | 1 280 |
| 1946 | 1 513 |
| 1950 | 1 488 |
| 1964 | 1 292 |
| 1971 | 1 278 |

| Year | Population |
|---|---|
| 1981 | 1 114 |
| 1985 | 1 076 |
| 1989 | 1 021 |
| 1990 | 999 |
| 1991 | 1 028 |
| 1992 | 1 021 |
| 1993 | 1 012 |
| 1994 | 1 345 |
| 1995 | 1 371 |
| 1996 | 1 427 |

| Year | Population |
|---|---|
| 1997 | 1 405 |
| 1998 | 1 410 |
| 1999 | 1 385 |
| 2000 | 1 367 |
| 2001 | 1 289 |
| 2002 | 1 262 |
| 2003 | 1 263 |
| 2004 | 1 209 |
| 2005 | 1 214 |
| 2006 | 1 193 |

| Year | Population |
|---|---|
| 2007 | 1 151 |
| 2008 | 1 137 |
| 2009 | 1 123 |
| 2010 | 1 101 |
| 2011 | 1 050 |
| 2012 | 1 018 |
| 2013 | 983 |
| 2014 | 965 |
| 2015 | 1 121 |
| 2016 | 1 110 |
