= European Route of Industrial Heritage =

Network of the most important industrial heritage sites in Europe

The European Route of Industrial Heritage (ERIH) is a tourist route of the most important industrial heritage sites in Europe. This is a tourism industry information initiative to present a network of industrial heritage sites across Europe. The aim of the project is to create interest in the common European heritage of industrialisation and its legacy. ERIH also wants to promote regions, towns and sites showing the industrial history and market them as visitor attractions in the leisure and tourism industry.

== History ==
The concept of using a European Route of Industrial Heritage was born in 1999; it was recognised there had been no single event to shape the European landscape greater than the Industrial Revolution. That changed the working culture of all Europeans, and gave common experiences to communities across Europe whether it be deep mine coal working in the Ruhr or South Wales. Four countries, Great Britain, Belgium, Germany and the Netherlands successfully applied for EU Interreg IIC (North-Western Europe) funding to draw up a master plan. The plan demonstrates the economic potential as a primarily marketing brand. It also shows a possible structure. Its reasoning was that many individual sites had great footfall others had a very low profile. They used the analogy of small shops gathering together in large shopping centres for joint promotion. In the language of EU proposals the hubs are called anchor points; these could be cities or existing industrial sites with a developed tourism infrastructure.

The plan culminated in the Duisburg Declaration. (Note: The Declaration of Duisburg In this era of great changes to our European nations and cities, Industrial heritage is an important witness to our common history and identity. The common history of European industry has played and will continue to play an important part in the culture and identity of our European nations and it offers possibilities to create both shared and individual identities. The accessibility of our cultural heritage is a key element in experiencing this identity and it helps us to understand better our common roots. The sustainable development of our industrial heritage helps to secure the economic and social regeneration of municipalities. Historical continuity creates a sense of belonging and respect for the historical environment. “The European Route of Industrial Heritage” is a project that underlines the importance of our shared industrial past. It will create accessibility to Europe’s industrial heritage for the inhabitants of our nations and will help identify the locations where sustainable redevelopment has to take place. In our professional involvement with industrial heritage, we are aware of its major importance for the future of spatial planning, cultural heritage tourism and recreation and for the individual identities of nations. We embrace the ERIH concept with its network of Anchor Points, Transnational Theme Routes, and Regional Routes as a convincing programme for transnational cooperation and regional tourism development. Therefore ERIH - The European Route of Industrial Heritage – is our common concern. Duisburg, 1 December 2001)

With the plan adopted its implementation was funded by Interreg IIIB-north-western Europe, and the scheme rolled out; starting in the northwest and progressing south and east. ERIH is a registered association under German law. When funding ran out there were 850 member attractions which has risen to 1,850 sites across the EU28 countries. In October 2014 further funding was obtained from the EU Creative Europe programme. The European Route of Industrial Heritage has been a Cultural Route of the Council of Europe since 2019.

== Anchor points ==
The – virtual – main route is built by the so-called Anchor Points. These are Industrial Heritage sites which are the historically most important and most attractive for visitors. The route leads through 13 countries thus far (in 2014): United Kingdom, the Netherlands, Belgium, Luxembourg, Germany, France, Spain, Italy, Czech Republic, Poland, Sweden, Norway, Denmark, and Portugal (in 2017).

The anchor sites in are:

| Nation | Location | Site | Theme(s) |
|---|---|---|---|
| (United Kingdom) | Manchester | Science and Industry Museum | Transport, power, textiles, communications and computing |
| (Netherlands) | Amsterdam | Heineken Experience – Heineken Brewery | Production and manufacturing |
| (Germany) | Augsburg | Textile and industrial museum (tim) | Textiles |
| (United Kingdom) | Birmingham | Museum of the Jewellery Quarter | Production and manufacturing |
| (United Kingdom) | Blaenavon | Big Pit National Coal Museum | Mining, landscapes |
| (Belgium) | Blegny | Blegny-Mine | Mining |
| (Germany) | Bocholt | TextilWerk Bocholt LWL Industrial Museum | Textiles |
| (France) | Calais | The International City of Lace and Fashion | Textiles |
| (Italy) | Carbonia | Italian Centre for Coal Mining, Culture | Mining, landscapes |
| (Germany) | Chemnitz | Chemnitz Museum of Industry | Textiles, production and manufacturing, transport and communication |
| (Denmark) | Copenhagen | Visit Carlsberg / Carlsberg Visitors Centre | Production and manufacturing |
| (Spain) | Cornellà de Llobregat | Museu Agbar de les Aigües | Water |
| (United Kingdom) | Cromford | Derwent Valley Mills | Textiles, landscapes |
| (Germany) | Delmenhorst | Nordwolle | Textiles, housing and architecture |
| (Germany) | Dortmund | LWL Industrial Museum Zollern II/IV Colliery | Mining, housing and architecture |
| (Germany) | Duisburg | North Duisburg Landscape Park | Iron and steel, landscapes |
| (United Kingdom) | Dundee | Verdant Works | Textiles |
| (United Kingdom) | Duxford | Imperial War Museum Duxford | Transport and communication, industry and war |
| (United Kingdom) | Elsecar | Elsecar Heritage Centre | Mining |
| (Netherlands) | Enschede | De MuseumFabriek | Textiles |
| (Germany) | Essen | Zollverein XII Colliery & Coking Plant World Heritage Site | Mining, housing and architecture |
| (Germany) | Euskirchen | LVR Industrial Museum Mueller Cloth Mill | Textiles |
| (Sweden) | Falun | Falun Mine, World Heritage Site | Mining, landscapes |
| (Germany) | Furtwangen | German Clock Museum, German Clock Route | Production and manufacturing |
| (Belgium) | Gent | Museum of Industrial Archaeology and Textile | Textiles |
| (Germany) | Goslar | Mines of Rammelsberg World Heritage Site | Mining |
| (Germany) | Gräfenhainichen | Ferropolis - Town of Iron | Mining, iron and steel |
| (Sweden) | Grimeton | World Heritage Grimeton | Transport and communication |
| (France) | Grossouvre | Charcoal halle of Grossouvre | Iron and steel |
| (Netherlands) | Haarlemmermeer | Steam Pumping Station De Cruquius | Water, housing and architecture |
| (Germany) | Hamburg | Hamburg Museum of Work | Production and manufacturing, transport and communication |
| (Netherlands) | Hoorn | Hoorn-Medemblik Steam Tram Museum | Transport and communication |
| (Germany) | Hoyerswerda | Lusatia Mining Museum, Knappenrode Energy Factory | Mining, application of power, landscapes |
| (Netherlands) | Kerkrade | Discovery Center Continium, Kerkrade | Mining, production and manufacturing |
| (Denmark) | Kongens Lyngby | Brede Works | Textiles, production and manufacturing, housing and architecture |
| (Germany) | Lage | Westphalian Industrial Museum Brick Works Lage | Production and manufacturing |
| (United Kingdom) | Lanark | New Lanark | Textiles, housing and architecture |
| (Germany) | Lichterfeld | Overburden Conveyor Bridge F60 | Mining, iron and steel, landscapes |
| (United Kingdom) | Llanberis | National Slate Museum | Production and manufacturing, housing and architecture, landscapes |
| (Poland) | Łódź | Manufaktura, Museum of the Factory | Textiles |
| (Poland) | Łódź | White Factory | Textiles |
| (Poland) | Łódź | EC1 Łódź – City of Culture | Application of power |
| (United Kingdom) | London | London Museum of Water & Steam | Application of power, water |
| (Belgium) | Marcinelle | Bois du Cazier | Mining |
| (Netherlands) | Medemblik | Netherlands Steam Machine Museum | Production and manufacturing, application of power |
| (Norway) | Narvik | Museum Nord, Narvik | Transport and communication |
| (United Kingdom) | Northwich | Lion Salt Works | Mining, salt |
| (Germany) | Oberhausen | Gasometer next to CentrO | Iron and steel, application of power |
| (Norway) | Oslo | Norwegian Museum of Science, Technology, Industry and Medicine | Textiles |
| (Czech Republic) | Ostrava | Michal Mine | Mining |
| (Germany) | Papenburg | Meyer Shipyard | Production and manufacturing, transport and communication |
| (Germany) | Peenemünde | The Peenemünde Historical Museum | Production and manufacturing, application of power, landscapes |
| (United Kingdom) | Pendeen, Penzance | Geevor Tin Mine | Mining, landscapes |
| (France) | Petite-Rosselle | Carreau Wendel Museum | Mining |
| (Czech Republic) | Pilsen | Pilsner Urquell Brewery and Museum | Production and manufacturing |
| (Italy) | Prato | Campolmi Factory, Lazzerini Library, Textile Museum | Textiles |
| (United Kingdom) | Redruth | Heartlands | Mining |
| (Norway) | Rjukan | Norwegian Industrial Workers Museum | Application of power |
| (United Kingdom) | Sheffield | Kelham Island Museum | Iron and steel, production and manufacturing, application of power |
| (Germany) | Solingen | LVR Industrial Museum Hendrichs Drop Forge | Iron and steel |
| (United Kingdom) | Southampton | Bursledon Brickworks Industrial Museum | Production and manufacturing |
| (Norway) | Spillum | Norwegian Sawmill Museum | Production and manufacturing |
| (United Kingdom) | St Austell | Wheal Martyn | Production and manufacturing, landscapes, mining |
| (United Kingdom) | Swansea | National Waterfront Museum | Mining, iron and steel, production and manufacturing, transport and communication |
| (Poland) | Tarnowskie Góry | Tarnowskie Góry silver mine | Mining |
| (United Kingdom) | Telford | Ironbridge Gorge Museums | Iron and steel, production and manufacturing, transport and communication |
| (Spain) | Terrassa | Catalan Museum of Science and Industry | Textiles, transport and communication, application of power |
| (Poland) | Tychy | Tyskie Brewing Museum | Production and manufacturing |
| (Norway) | Tyssedal | Norwegian Museum of Hydro Power and Industry | Application of power, landscapes |
| (Germany) | Völklingen | World Heritage Site Voelklingen Iron Works | Iron and steel, application of power, landscapes |
| (United Kingdom) | Wakefield | National Coal Mining Museum for England | Mining |
| (United Kingdom) | Waltham Abbey | Waltham Abbey Royal Gunpowder Mills | Production and manufacturing, transport and communication, landscapes |
| (Netherlands) | Zaandam | Zaanse Schans | Application of power, water |
| (Poland) | Zabrze | Guido historic coal mine | Mining |
| (Germany) | Zehdenick | Mildenberg Brick Work Park | Production and manufacturing |
| (Netherlands) | Zevenaar | Brick Works De Panoven | Production and manufacturing |
| (Germany) | Zwickau | August Horch Museum | Production and manufacturing, transport and communication |
| (Poland) | Żywiec | Żywiec Brewery Museum | Production and manufacturing |

== Regional Routes ==
Regional Routes (like the Route der Industriekultur in the Ruhr) cover regions as where industrial history has left its mark. As of 2017 there are seventeen:

Austria
Styrian Iron Trail
Germany
Northwest
Ruhrgebiet
Industrial Valleys
Euregio Maas-Rhine
Saxony-Anhalt
Lusatia
Rhine-Main
Saar Lor Lux
Netherlands
HollandRoute
Euregio Maas-Rhine
Poland
Silesia
Spain
Catalonia

United Kingdom
Southwest Yorkshire
South Wales
Cornwall

== European Theme Routes ==
Thirteen European Theme Routes show the diversity of industrial landscapes all over Europe and the common roots of industrial history:

- Application of Power
- Housing and Architecture
- Industry and War
- Iron and Steel
- Industrial Landscapes
- Mining
- Paper
- Production & Manufacturing
- Salt
- Service and Leisure Industry
- Textiles
- Transport & Communication
- Water
