= Chaos Communication Camp =

International meeting of hackers

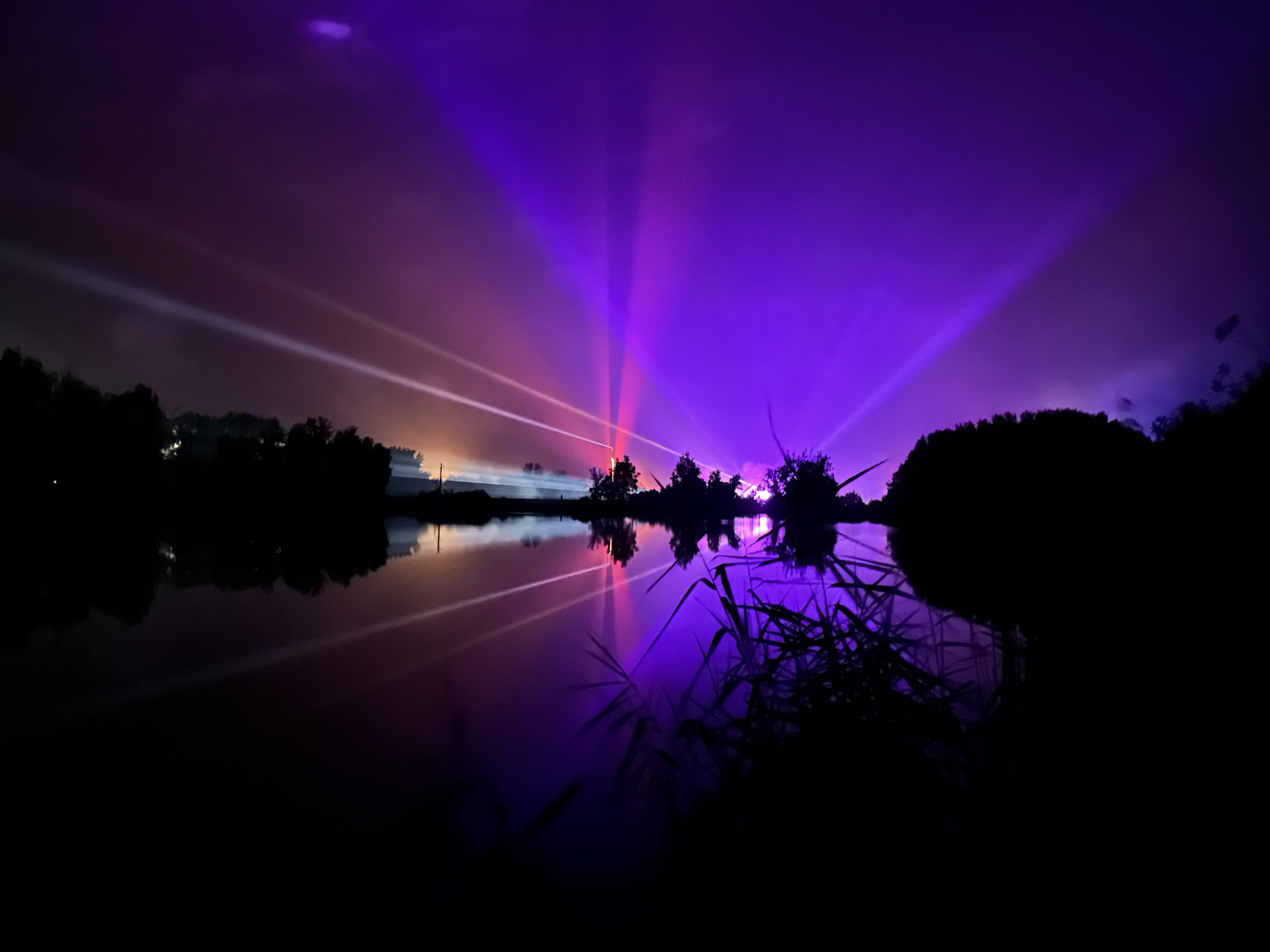
Chaos Communication Camp 2023 in Mildenberg, Germany

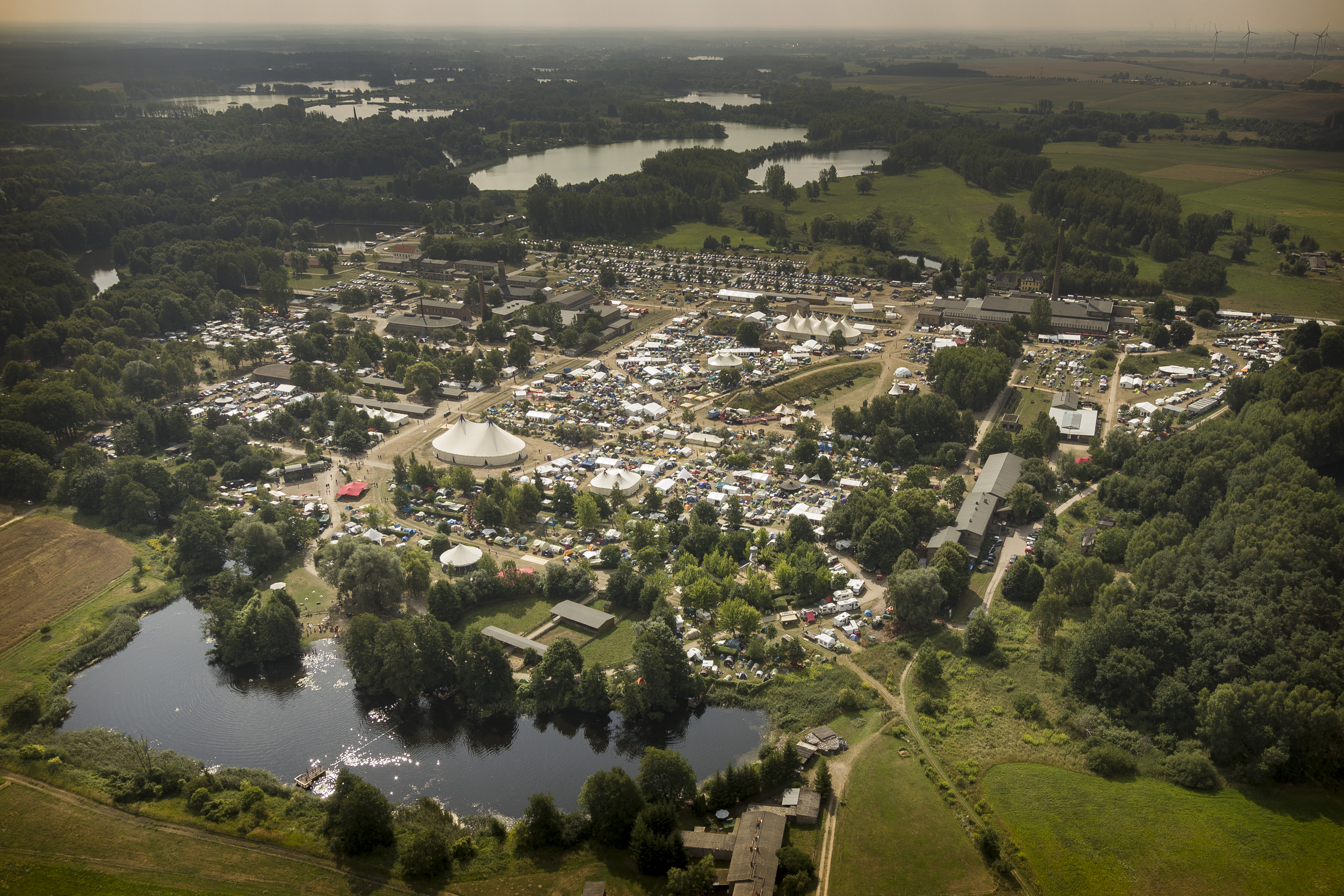
Chaos Communication Camp 2015 aerial (day 4)

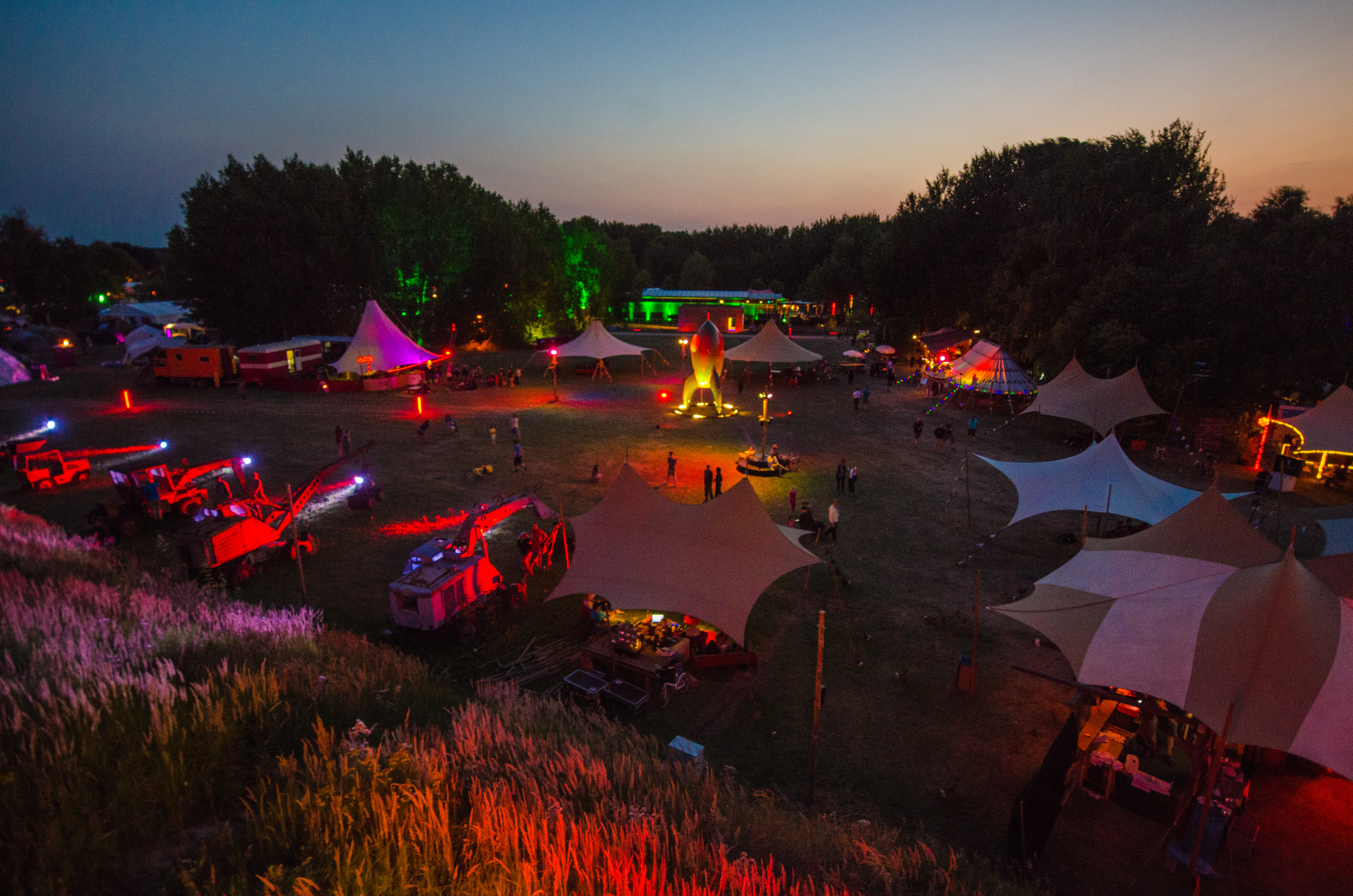
The Fairydust at the CCCamp15-site in Mildenberg

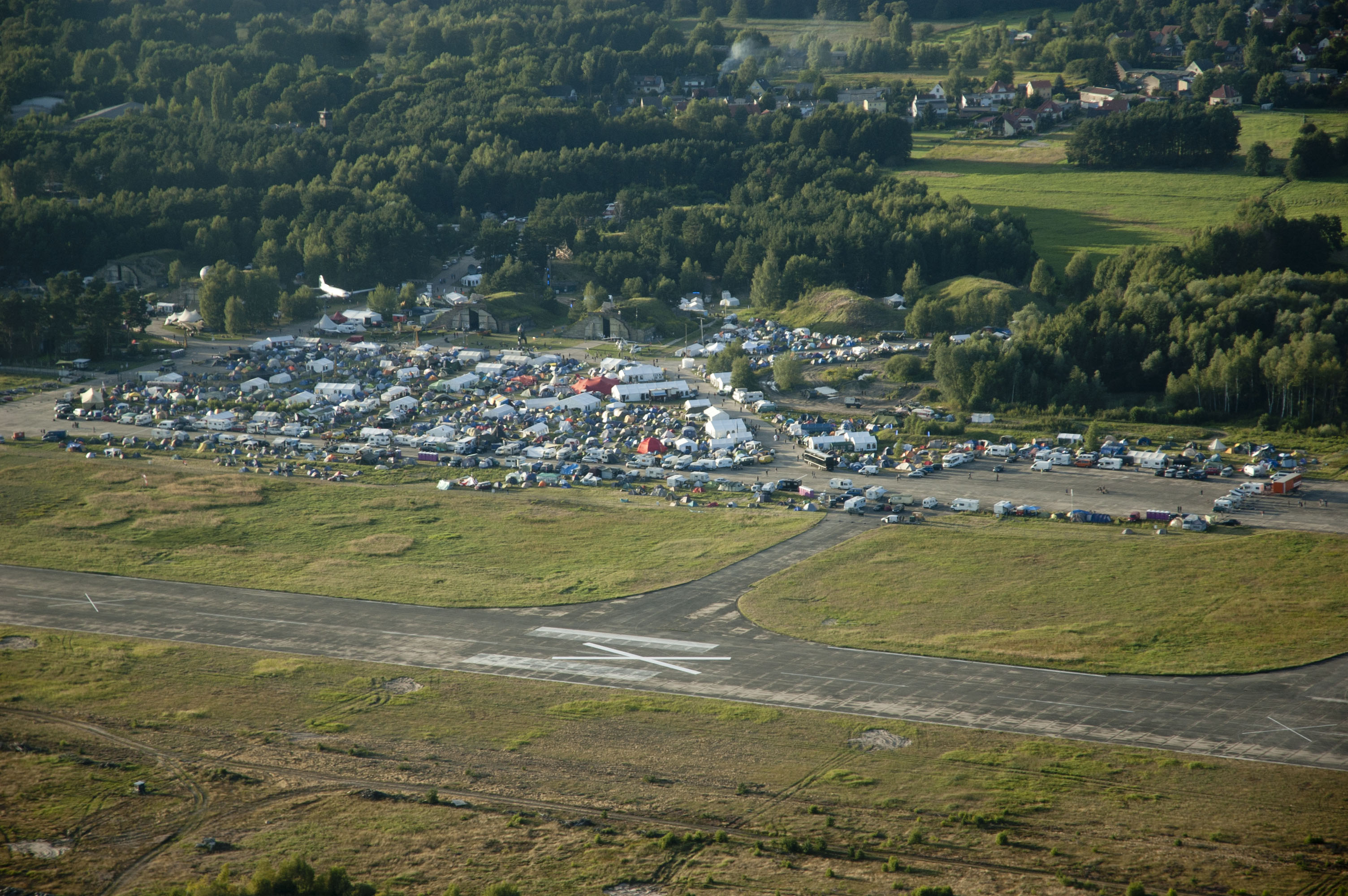
Chaos Communication Camp 2011 aerial shot

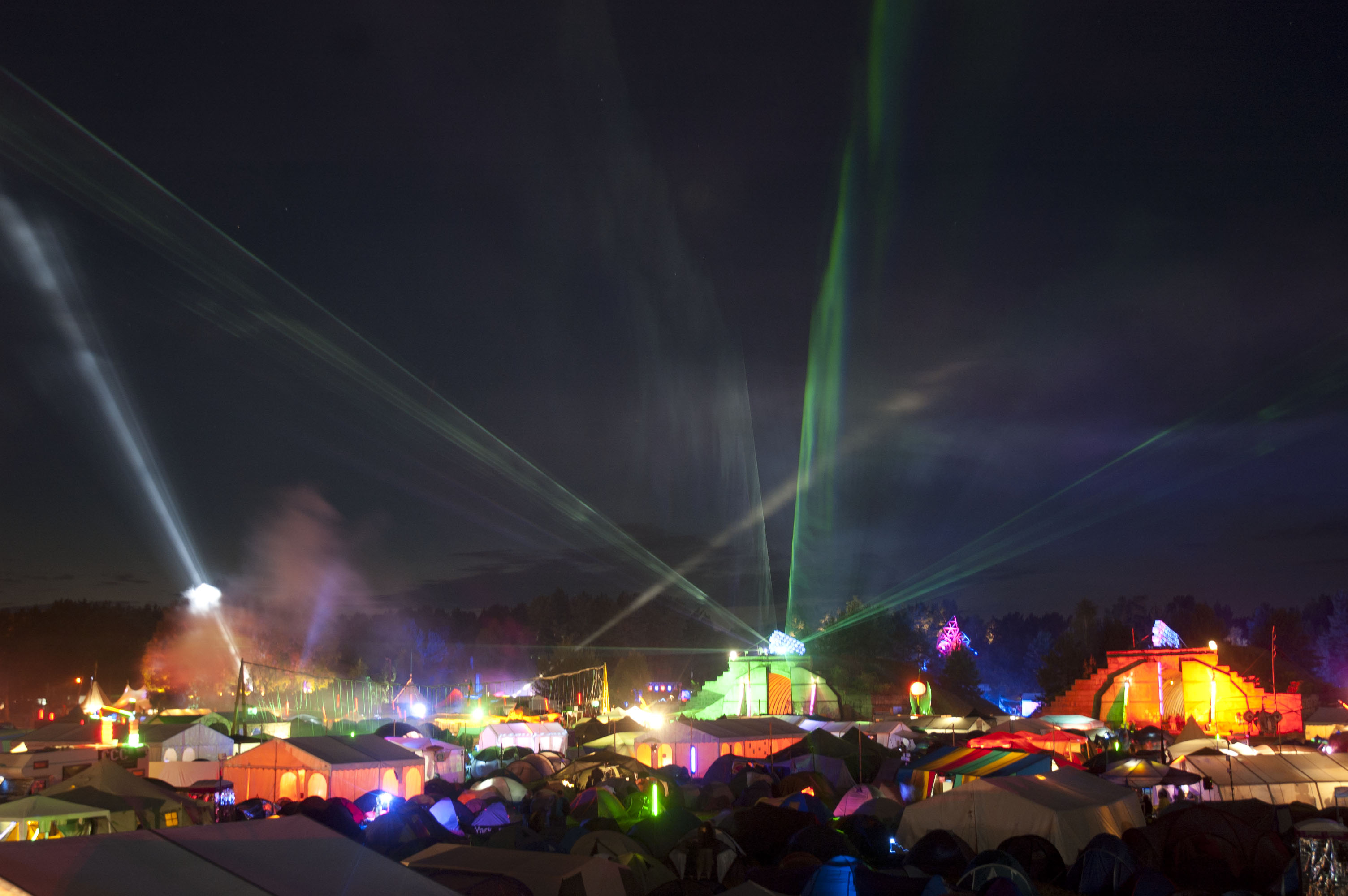
Chaos Communication Camp 2011 lasershow

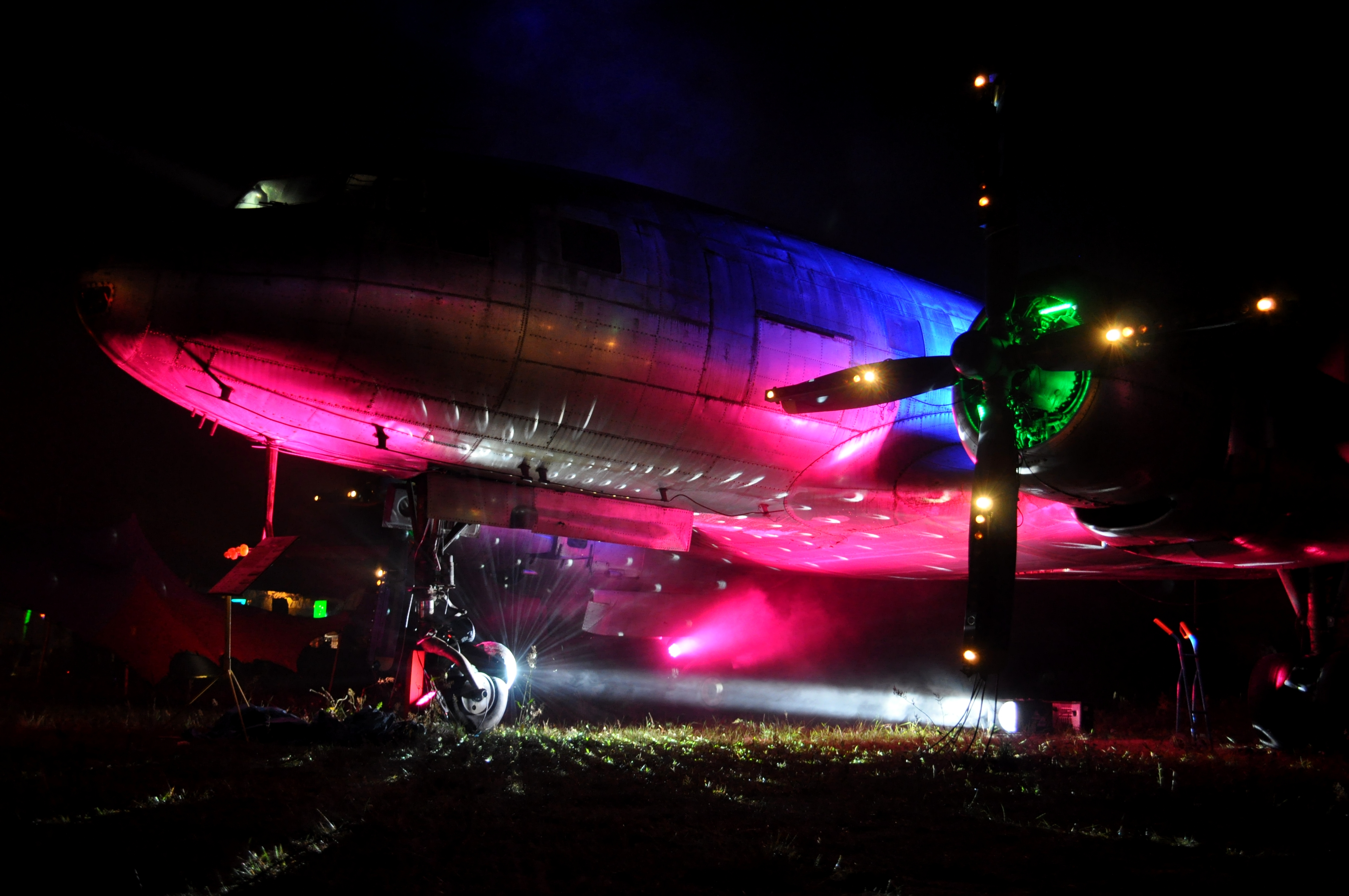
A plane on the ground

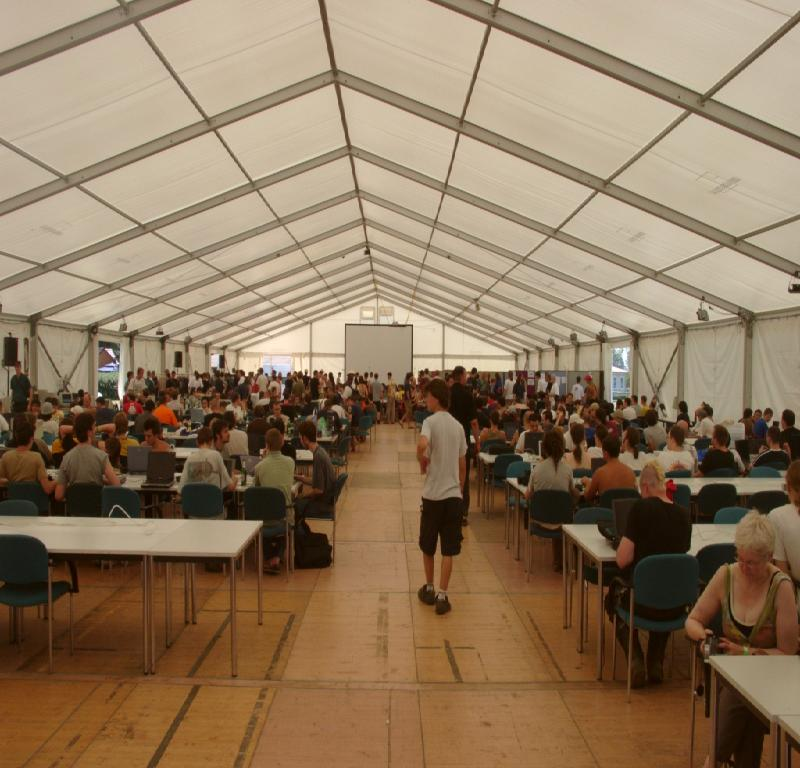
Hackcenter tent

The Chaos Communication Camp (also known as CCCamp) is an international meeting of hackers that takes place every four years, organized by the Chaos Computer Club (CCC). So far all CCCamps have been held near Berlin, Germany.

The camp is an event for providing information about technical and societal issues, such as privacy, freedom of information and data security. Hosted speeches are held in big tents and conducted in English as well as German. Each participant may pitch a tent and connect to a fast internet connection and power.

== List of Camps ==
No.	Event	Date	Participants	Location
1.	CCCamp 1999	August 6–8, 1999		Freizeithof Paulshof near Altlandsberg
2.	CCCamp 2003	August 7–10, 2003		Freizeithof Paulshof near Altlandsberg
3.	CCCamp 2007	August 8–12, 2007		Aviation Museum Finowfurt (Luftfahrtmuseum Finowfurt)
4.	CCCamp 2011	August 10–14, 2011		Aviation Museum Finowfurt (Luftfahrtmuseum Finowfurt)
5.	CCCamp 2015	August 13–17, 2015		Mildenberg Brick Work Park (Ziegeleipark Mildenberg) near Zehdenick
6.	CCCamp 2019	August 21–25, 2019		Mildenberg Brick Work Park (Ziegeleipark Mildenberg) near Zehdenick
7.	CCCamp 2023	August 15–19, 2023	6000	Mildenberg Brick Work Park (Ziegeleipark Mildenberg) near Zehdenick

== See also ==
- Chaos Communication Congress, an annual indoor event, held in December in Germany
- Hack-Tic hacker events, a quadrennial outdoor event, held in August in the Netherlands
- Electromagnetic Field, a biennial outdoor event, held in England
