= Brickworks (disambiguation) =

A brickworks is a factory for making bricks.

Brickworks may also refer to:

- Brickworks (company), Australian building materials company
- Brickworks, Singapore, a subzone of Bukit Batok, Singapore
  - Brickworks Group Representation Constituency, a defunct Group Representation Constituency in Bukit Merah
  - Brickworks Single Member Constituency, a defunct a constituency in Singapore
- Brickworks Marketplace, shopping centre on the site of a former brickworks in Adelaide, South Australia

== See also ==
- Brick Works De Panoven, a museum in Zevenaar, the Gelderland, the Netherlands
- Brickwork
