= Deep level underground =

Construction 20 meters or more below ground, using methods other than cut-and-cover

Deep level underground is construction that is 20 m (66 ft) or more below ground and not using the cut-and-cover method, especially train stations, air raid shelters and bunkers, and some tunnels and mines. Cut-and-cover is a simple method of construction for shallow tunnels where a trench is excavated and roofed over with an overhead support structure that is strong enough to carry the load of what is to be built above the tunnel.

== History ==
=== Mining ===
Although some deep mining took place as early as the late Tudor period (in North-East England, and along the Firth of Forth coast in Scotland) deep shaft mining in Britain began to develop extensively in the late 18th century, with rapid expansion throughout the 19th century and early 20th century when the industry peaked. Before 1800, a great deal of coal was left in places as extraction was still primitive. As a result, in the deep Tyneside pits (300 to 1,000 ft deep) only about 40 percent of the coal could be extracted. The use of wooden pit props to support the roof was an innovation first introduced about 1800.

=== Transit systems ===
Before any plans were made for transit systems with tunnels and stations, several railway operators had used tunnels for freight and passenger trains, usually to reduce the grade of the railway line. Examples include Trevithick's Tunnel from 1804, built for the Penydarren locomotive, the 1829 Crown Street Tunnel at Liverpool and the 1.13 miles (1,820 metres) long 1836 Lime Street Tunnel also at Liverpool, of which a part is still used today making it the world's oldest used tunnel.

The world's first urban underground railway was the Metropolitan Railway, which opened on January 10, 1863. It was built largely in shallow tunnels (see more at cut and cover) and is nowadays part of the London Underground. It was operated using steam trains, and despite the creation of numerous ventilation shafts, was unhealthy and uncomfortable for passengers and operating staff. Nevertheless, its trains were popular from the start and the Metropolitan Railway and the competing Metropolitan District Railway developed the Inner Circle around central London (completed in 1884) and an extensive system of suburban branches to the northwest (extending into the adjoining countryside), the west, the southwest and the east (mostly completed by 1904).

Liverpool James Street railway station, together with Hamilton Square underground station in Birkenhead are the oldest deep level underground stations in the world, while London's underground stations were just below the street surface built by means of the cut-and-cover method. The stations were so deep they required lifting to access easily, this gave another world's first in having the first lift-accessed stations. The lifts were hydraulically operated. For the first deep-level tube line, the City and South London Railway, two 10 feet 2 inches (3.10 m) diameter circular tube tunnels were dug between King William Street (close to today's Monument station) and Stockwell, following under the roads above to avoid the need for an agreement with owners of property on the surface. This opened in 1890 with electric locomotives that hauled carriages with small opaque windows, nicknamed "padded cells".

== Construction ==
Cut-and-cover is a simple method of construction for shallow tunnels where a trench is excavated and roofed over with an overhead support structure strong enough to support the load of what would be built above the tunnel. Modern deep level construction is usually done by using tunnel boring machines.

In London, the Circle, District, Hammersmith & City, and Metropolitan lines are services that run on the sub-surface network that has railway tunnels just below the surface and built mostly using the "cut-and-cover" method. The tunnels and trains are of a similar size to those on British main lines. The Hammersmith & City and Circle lines share all their stations and most of the track with other lines. The Bakerloo, Central, Jubilee, Northern, Piccadilly, Victoria and Waterloo & City lines are deep-level tube lines, using smaller trains that run through two circular tunnels with a diameter of about 11 feet 8 inches (3.56 m), lined with cast iron or precast concrete rings, which were bored using a tunnelling shield. These were referred to as the tube lines, although since the 1950s the term "tube" has come to be used to refer to the whole London Underground system.

== Deepest train stations ==
Many metro systems in post-Soviet states (particularly Ukraine and Russia), as well as some London Underground lines, have deep level stations. The deepest high-speed rail station in operation, the Badaling Great Wall railway station in Beijing, China, has platforms 102 metres (335 ft) below street level. The world's deepest metro station is Hongyancun station of Chongqing Rail Transit, at 116 metres (381 ft) below street level, followed by Arsenalna on the Kyiv Metro, which is 105 metres (344 ft) below street level.

== Deepest mines ==
- The deepest mines in the world are the TauTona (Western Deep Levels) and Savuka gold mines in the Witwatersrand region of South Africa, which are currently working at depths exceeding 3,900 m (12,800 ft). There are plans to extend Mponeng mine, a sister mine to TauTona, down to 4,500 m (14,800 ft) in the coming years.
- This region is also the location of the harshest conditions for hard rock mining, where workers toil in temperatures of up to 45 °C (113 °F). However, massive refrigeration plants are used to bring the air temperature down to around 28 °C (82 °F).
- The deepest hard rock mine in North America is Agnico-Eagle's LaRonde mine, which mines gold, zinc, copper and silver ores roughly 45 km (28 mi) east of Rouyn-Noranda in Cadillac, Quebec. LaRonde's Penna shaft (#3 shaft) is believed to be the deepest single lift shaft in the Western Hemisphere. The #4 shaft bottoms out at over 3,000 m (9,800 ft) down. Their LaRonde mine expansion sees open stopes down to a depth of over 3,000 m (9,800 ft), the deepest long hole open stopes in the world.
- The deepest mine in Europe is the 16th shaft of the uranium mines in Příbram, Czech Republic at 1,838 m (6,030 ft), second is Bergwerk Saar in Saarland, Germany at 1,750 meters.
- The deepest hard rock mines in Australia are the copper and zinc lead mines in Mount Isa, Queensland at 1,800 m (5,900 ft).
- The deepest platinum-palladium mines in the world are on the Merensky Reef, in South Africa, with a resource of 203 million troy ounces, currently worked to approximately 2,200 m (7,200 ft) depth.
- The deepest tourist level mine is Guido Mine and Coal Mining Museum in Zabrze, Poland.
- The deepest borehole is Kola Superdeep Borehole in Murmansk Oblast, Russia. At 12,262 m (40,230 ft), it is the deepest artificial extreme point of Earth.
