= Nordwolle =

Coordinates: 53.0543°N 8.6340°E

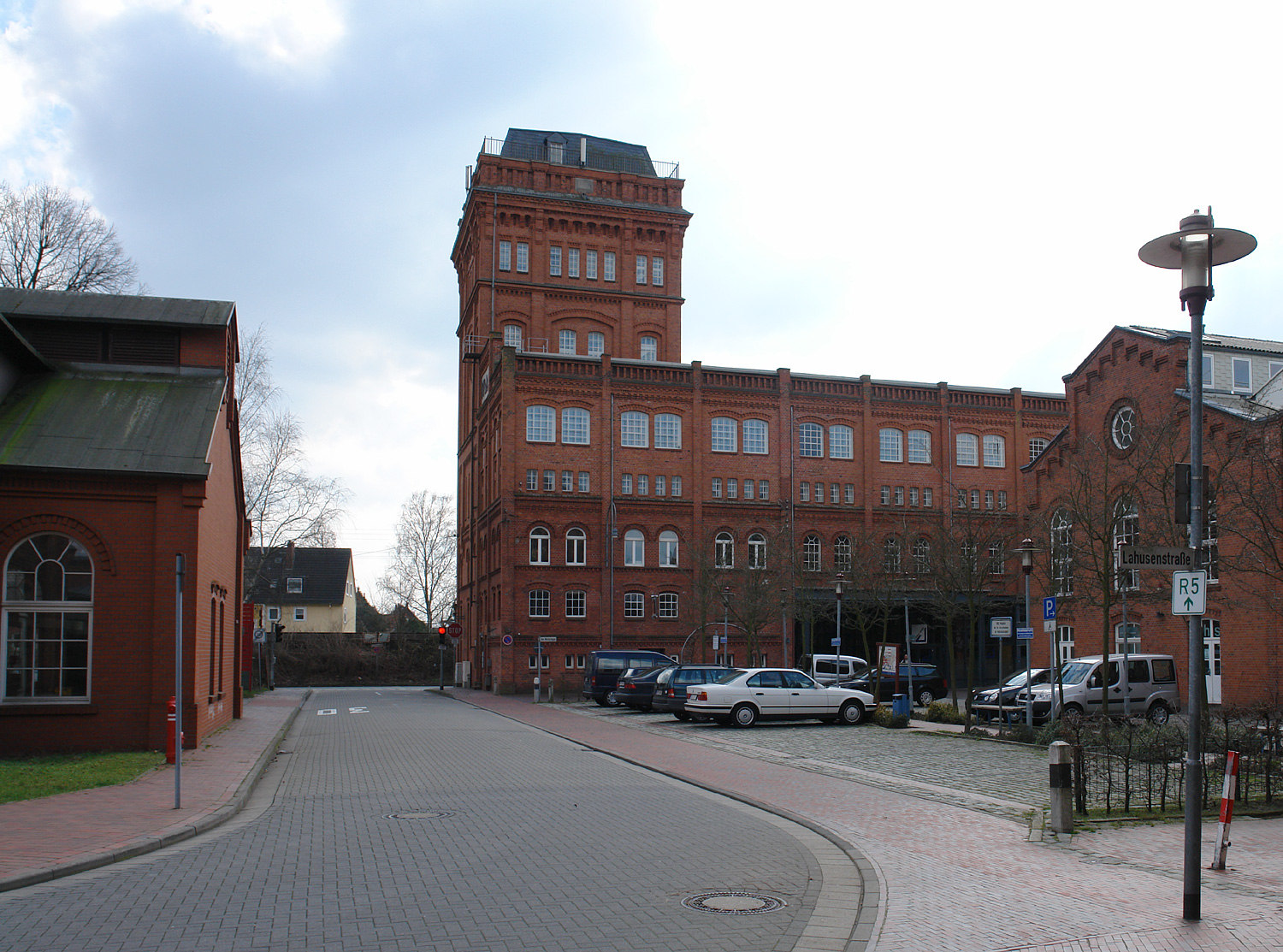
Former Factory Building

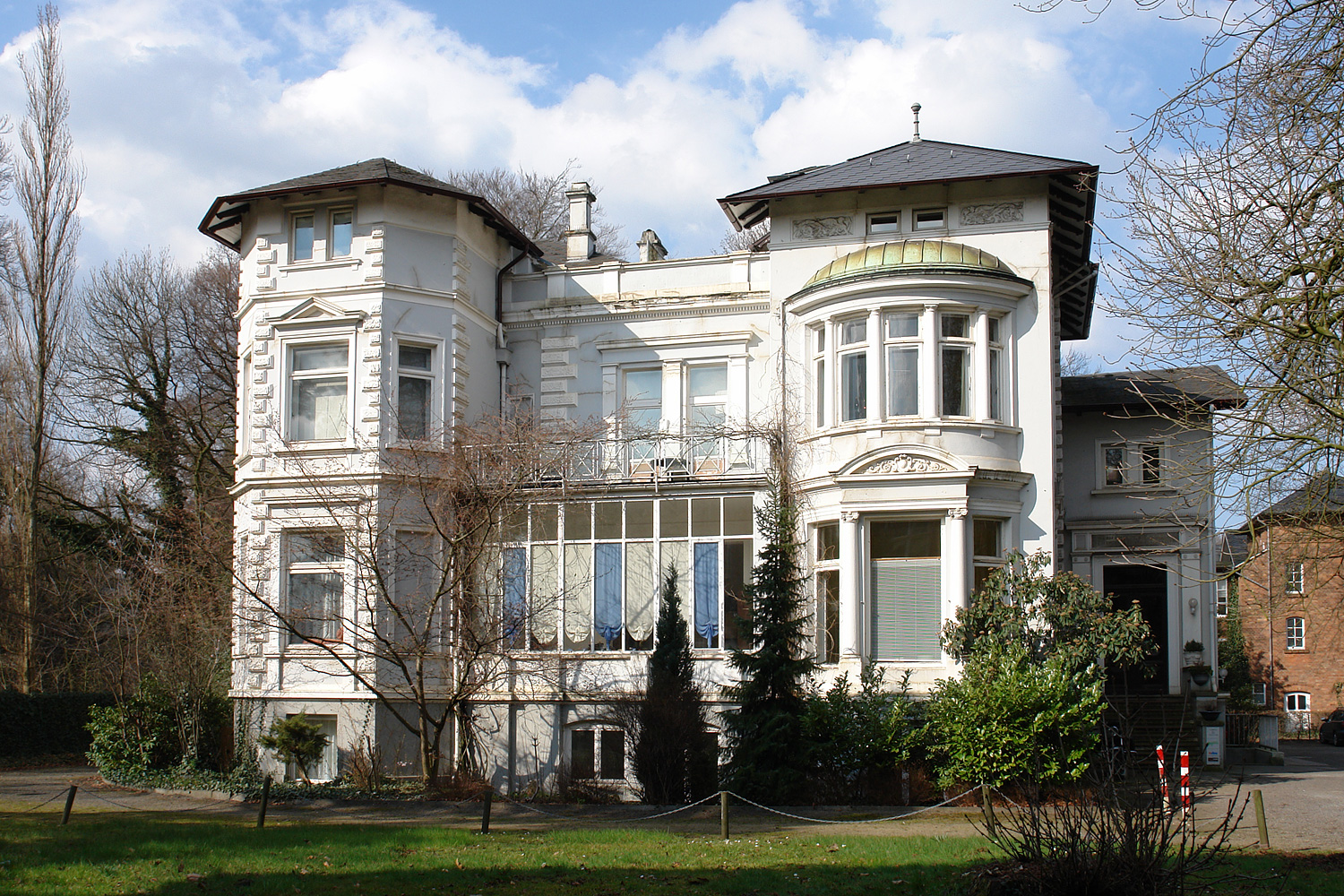
The Lahusen-Villa built in Delmenhorst in 1886

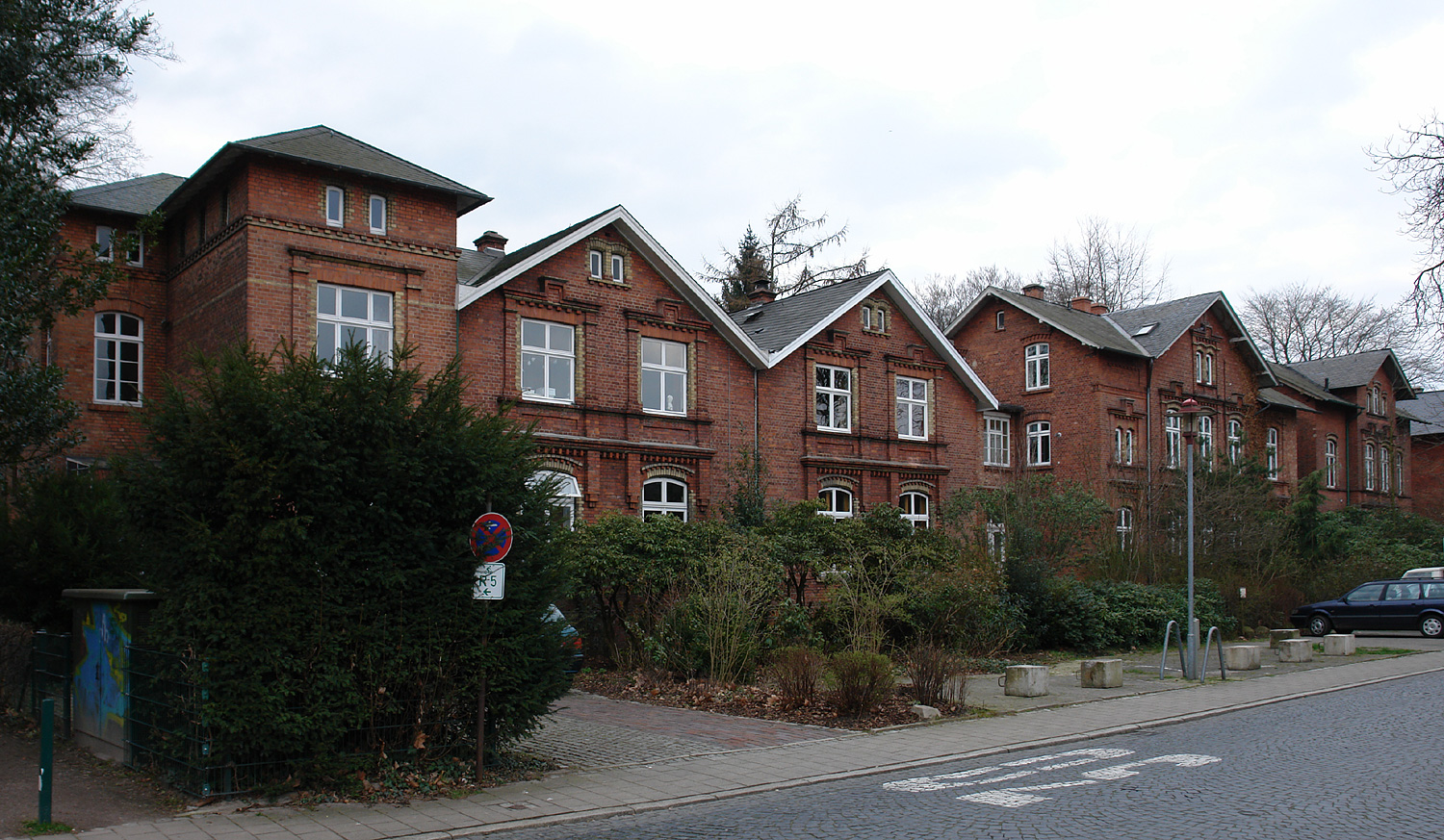
Former „Beamtenhäuser“ (homes of officials)

The Nordwolle or more correctly the Nordwolle museum or the Nordwestdeutsche Museum für IndustrieKultur is situated in and around the engine house of the former Norddeutsche Wollkämmerei & Kammgarnspinnerei in Delmenhorst. Nordwolle was a dominant company that processed wool and worsted, it closed between 1981 and 1984. The building and the factory housing is listed as a Denkmalschutz The museum is an Anchor point on the European Route of Industrial Heritage.

== History ==
In 1884, Christian Lahusen, a textile manufacturer from Bremen, set up the Norddeutsche Wollkämmerei & Kammgarnspinnerei (North German Wool Combing and Worsted Spinning Mill) next to the railway line in Delmenhorst, which brought wool from Bremen docks. The family business expanded into a major concern producing a quarter of all the world's rough yarn and employed almost 4,500 workers in the complex. Labour came from Eastern Europe. Between 1885 and 1905 the population of Delmenhorst tripled causing a chronic lack of housing. The firm responded by building ever more company housing on the “Nordwolle” site.

Under his son, Carl Lahusen, and his English born wife Armine Matthias, (Note: Armine Matthias was the daughter of a pastor who had lived in English mill towns and experienced patriarchal housing such as provided at the Houldsworth Model Village) the factory town provided cooperative stores, canteens and baths, a hospital, a kindergarten and a library. The world slump and mismanagement bankrupted Lahusen's firm in 1931: though it continued in a smaller scale until 1981.

== Museum ==
The Nordwolle Factory Museum opened in 1996 in the turbine hall and adjacent sheds. A year later the Municipal Museum open in the “Lichtstation”, the first engine room of the disused textile works.

=== Collections ===
The museum shows the production processes involved in worsted spinning and the social conditions of the young immigrant workers.
