= Mildenberg Brick Work Park =

Coordinates: 53.0309°N 13.3057°E

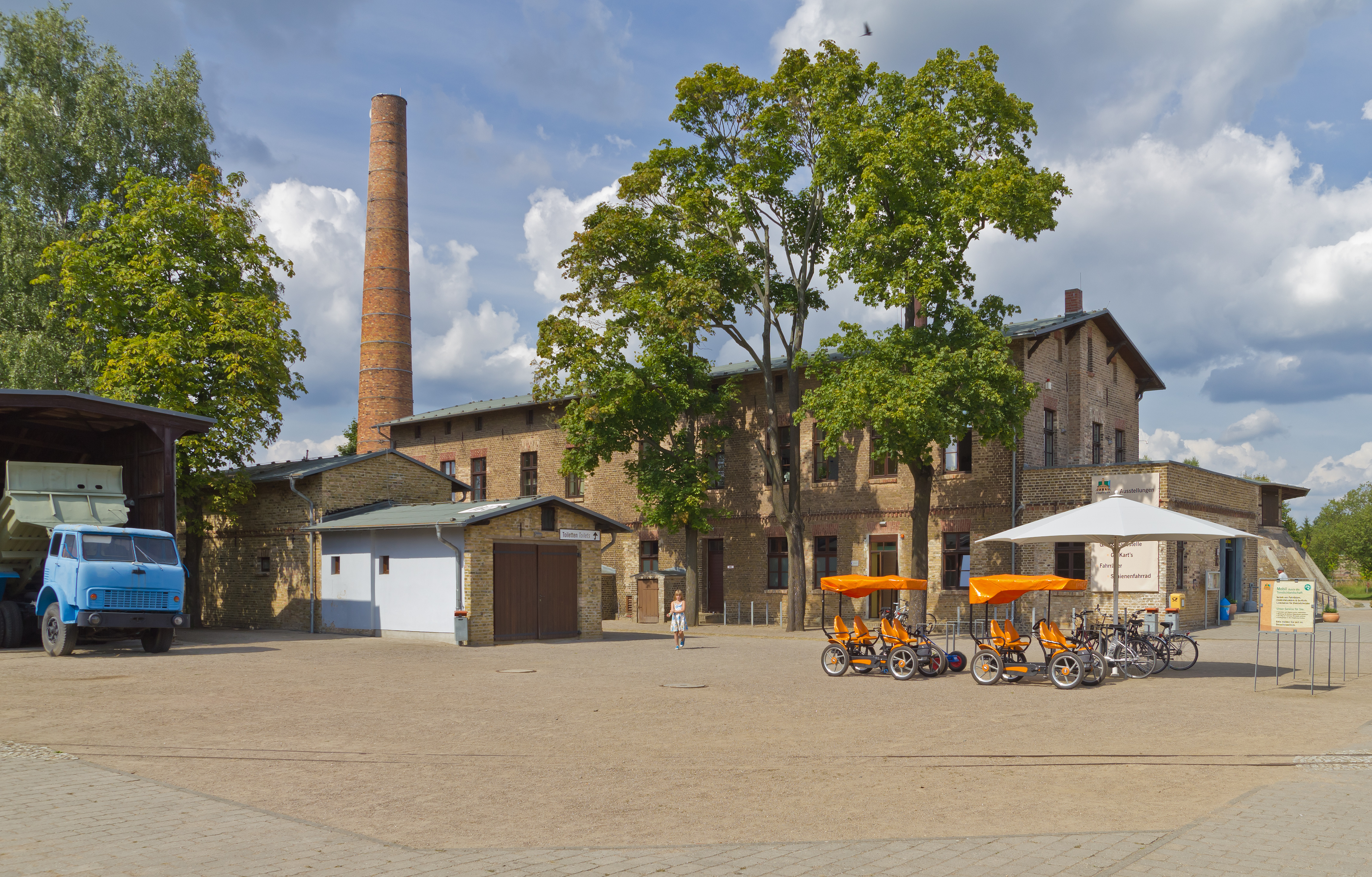
- Entrance and ring oven
- Location: Zehdenick, Brandenburg, Germany

The Mildenberg Brick Work Park is a visitor attraction and museum in Mildenberg, (Zehdenick) on the Havel in Brandenburg, Germany. The museum is an anchor point on the European Route of Industrial Heritage.

== Context ==
The area offers a high quality of the brick-making clay, the River Havel runs through the site and provides a direct transport route to Berlin. In the 1880s Berlin needed bricks. Up to 5,000 workers hand cut the clay, many of whom were internal migrants from the Lippe region in North Rhine-Westphalia and later from Silesia. They were housed in brick makers’ garrisons. There were 57 ring kilns and an annual production of 625,000,000 building bricks.

Later the clay was cut by chain-and-bucket excavators.

== Museum ==
The 58 ha park has two working brickworks from the GDR (East Germany) period, ring kilns, railways and engine workshops- a stationary steam engine and the flooded clay pits that provide an interesting environment for wildlife: including beavers and great bitterns.
