= Espace Métal =

Museum in Grossouvre, France

Coordinates: 46.8807°N 2.9208°E

- Location: Grossouvre, France
- Website: espacemetal.com

The Espace Métal is a museum located in the ancient Charcoal Hall at Grossouvre, near to St Amand Monrond in the Cher department in the Centre-Val de Loire region of France. The museum is an Anchor point on the European Route of Industrial Heritage.

== Context ==
Today Grossouvre is a village of farming, forestry and a little light industry situated by the banks of both the Aubois river and the canal de Berry some 23 miles (37 km) southeast of Bourges at the junction of the D76, D78 and the D920 roads.
