= State Textile and Industry Museum =

Museum in Germany

Coordinates: 48°21′50″N 10°54′47″E

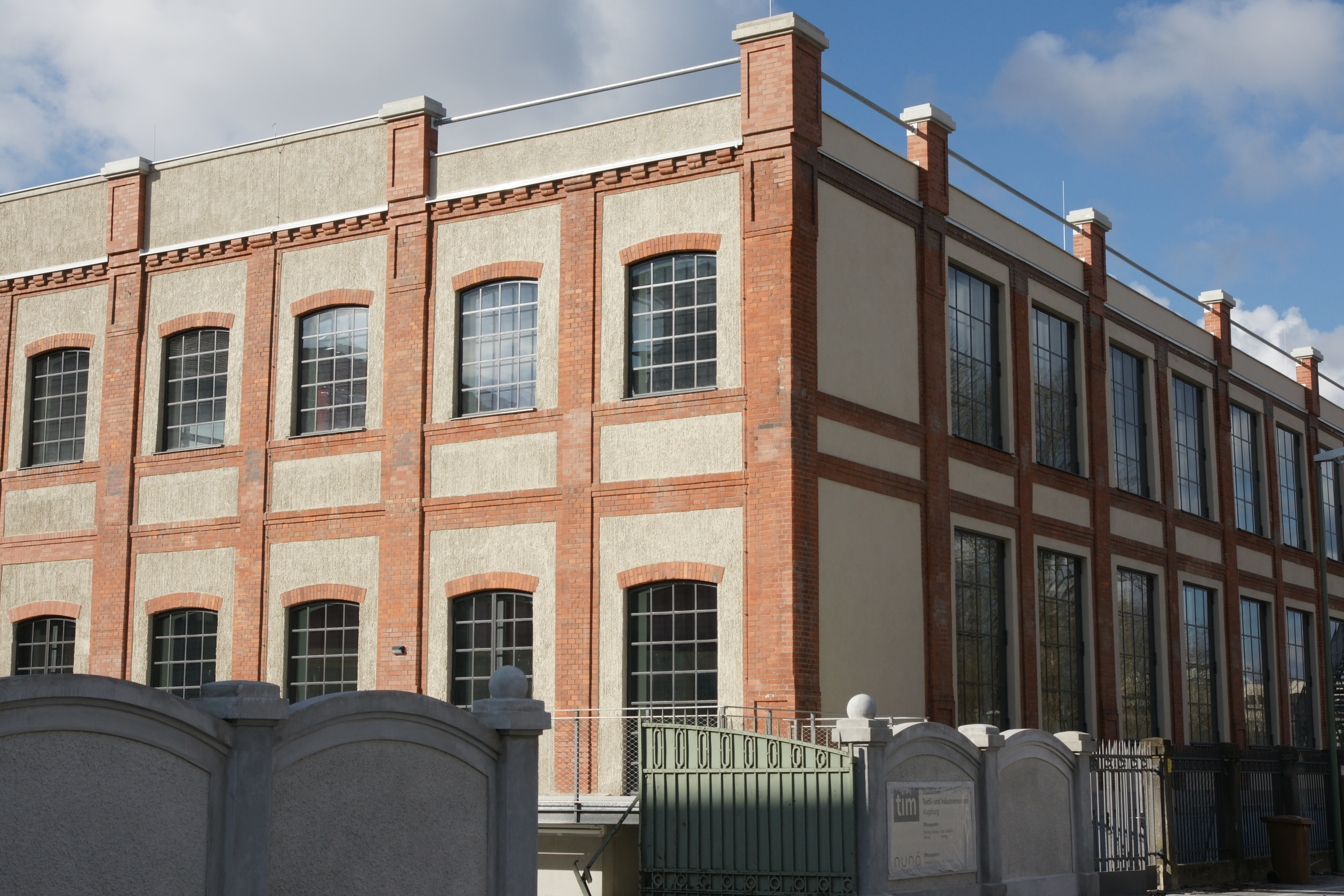
Augsburg textile and industry museum (tim)

The State Textile and Industry Museum, known by its acronym tim, is a museum in Augsburg a city in the south-west of Bavaria, Germany. It is situated in the Augsburger Kammgarnspinnerei, a former worsted spinning mill. The museum is an Anchor point on the European Route of Industrial Heritage.

== History ==
Augsburg had a thriving textile industry in the nineteenth century. The Augsburg Worsted Spinning Mill (Augsburger Kammgarnspinnerei — AKS) was founded in 1836 by Johann Anton Friedrich Merz. It was the first major industrial company in the city: it employed up to 2000 workers. It was the largest worsted spinning mill in the Federal Republic of Germany. It closed in 2004.

== Museum ==
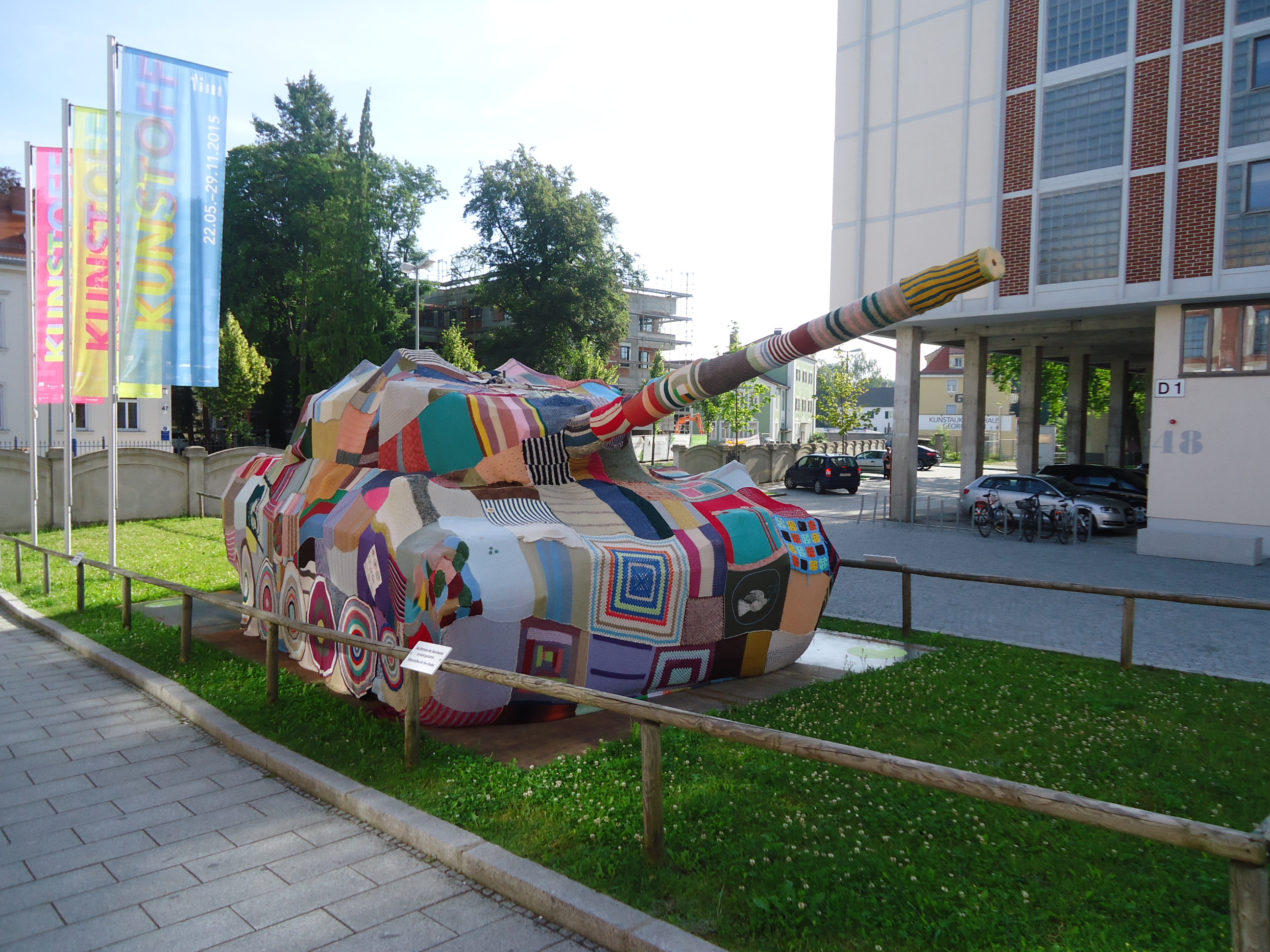
A tank covered in wool at tim

The mill was restored by Klaus Kada from Graz in Austria. It opened as a museum in 2010. Former textile workers had realised that the industry was disappearing and formed an association to rescue redundant equipment; the museum displays this collection. It covers the complete production cycle: from raw materials to designer fashions. A central piece in the museum is the NAK sample book, a collection of 1.3 million fabric designs from the 1780s to the 1990s.

The museum organises its displays under the headings Mensch-Maschine-Muster-Mode. That is

- Mensch – The stories of the workers in this industry with living testament.
- Maschine – In the machine hall is a working display of machines from across the ages, from hand to powerloom, producing a limited run of contemporary fabrics.
- Muster – concentrates on the pattern book
- Mode – shows the fashions from 'Biedermeier to Strenesse-Kleid'. Modern fabric are represented, stressing the opportunities for the Bayern economy.
- There are also special exhibitions.

== See also ==
- Cotton-spinning machinery
- European Route of Industrial Heritage
- Textile
