= Medemblik steam museum =

Museum in Medemblik, Netherlands

Coordinates: 52.7600°N 5.1136°E

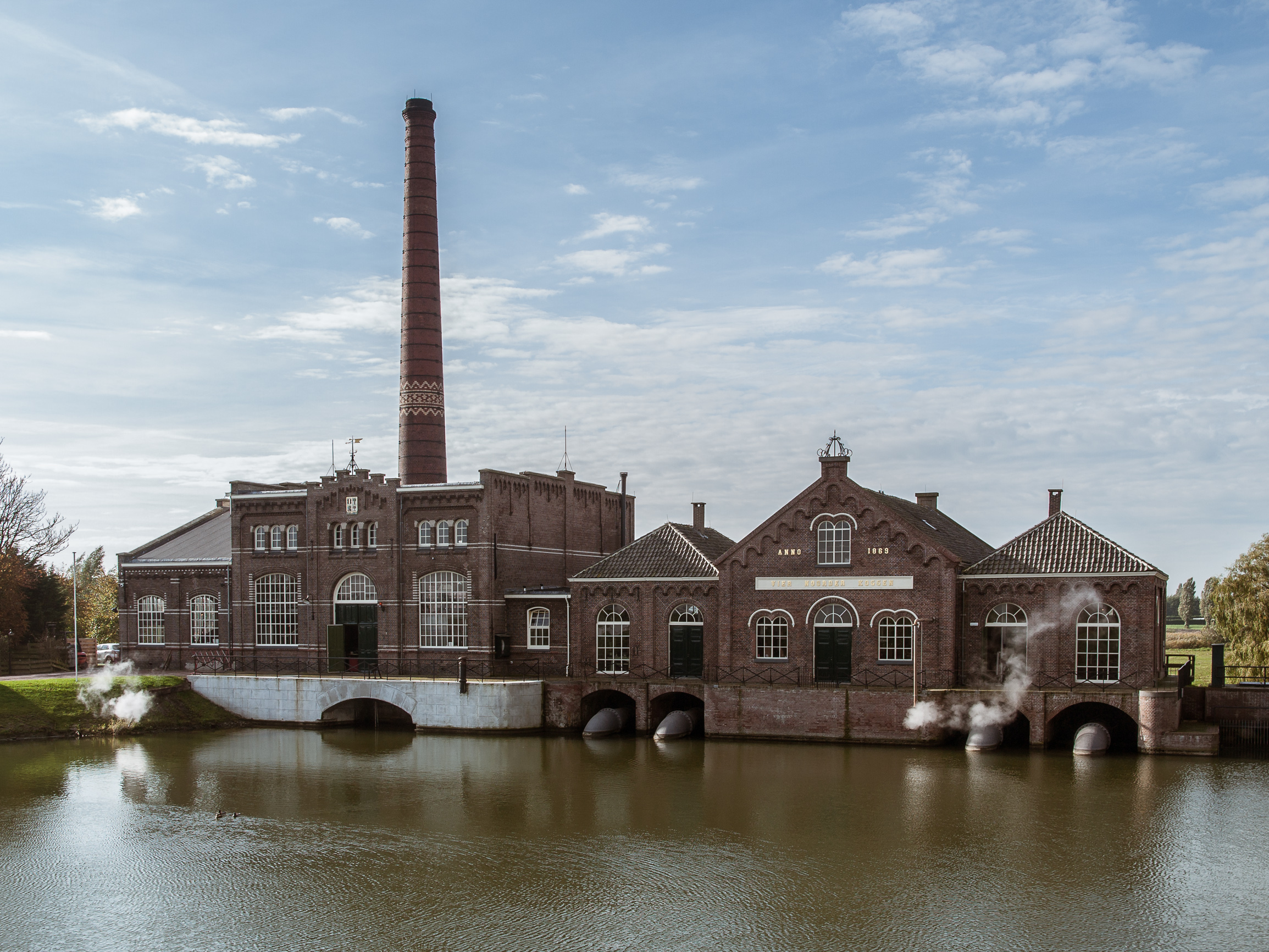

The Medemblik steam museum or officially the Netherlands Steam Engine Museum is a historical and science museum in Medemblik, North Holland, the Netherlands. Since 1985 the museum is located in a former pumping station, which was built in 1869 and decommissioned in 1979. The pumping station's installations are mostly still present and partly functioning. The museum is an anchor point on the European Route of Industrial Heritage, and the building and parts its interior are registered as a Rijksmonument, a national heritage site.

== Collection ==
In 1984 the old pumping station, bearing the name "Vier Noorder Koggen", was preserved in the shape of a museum. For more than hundred years, the pumping station played a significant role in the process of keeping the region West-Friesland habitable by pumping away rain water. When it became a museum in the 1980s, the already present steam installations became part of the museum collection, as well as a private collection of different engines and on-site machinery. The museum also maintains a steam dredger and a large collection of steam models. The models are exhibited together in order to illustrate the history of the Industrial Revolution in the Netherlands.
