= Museu Agbar de les Aigües =

Coordinates: 41.3551°N 2.0612°E

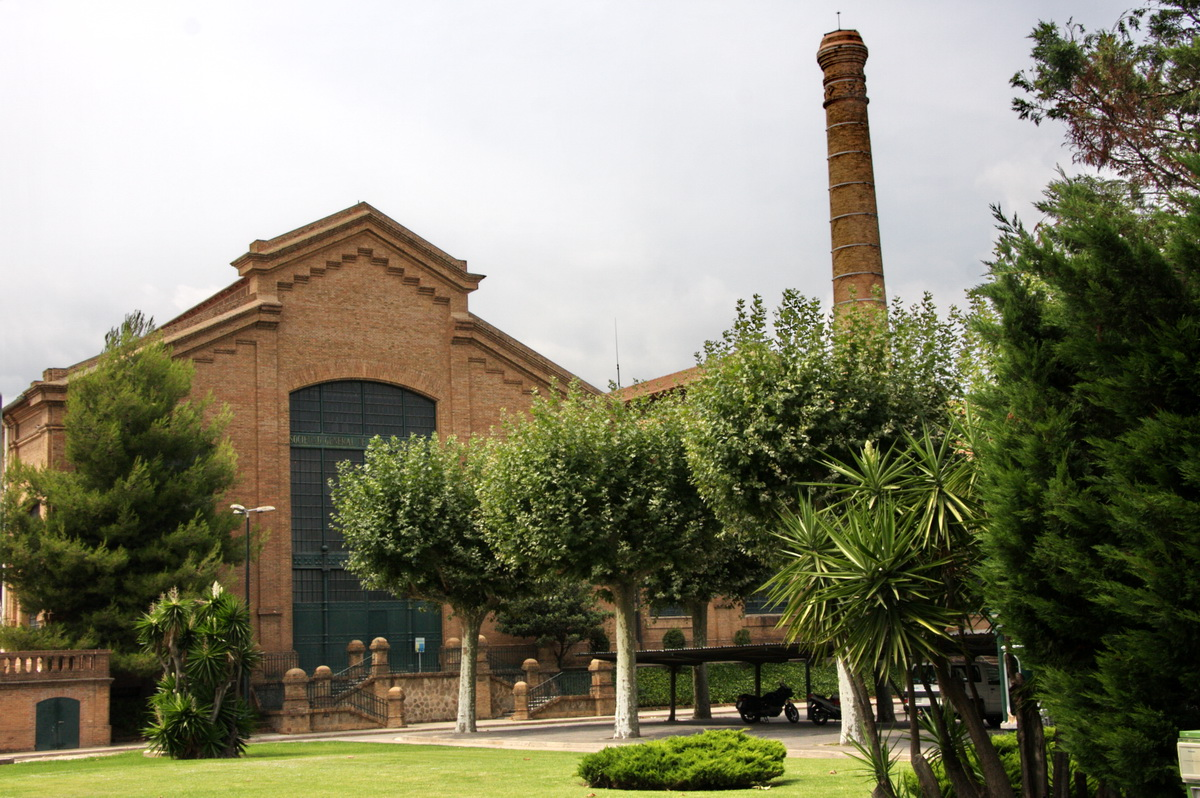
Museu Agbar de les Aigües.

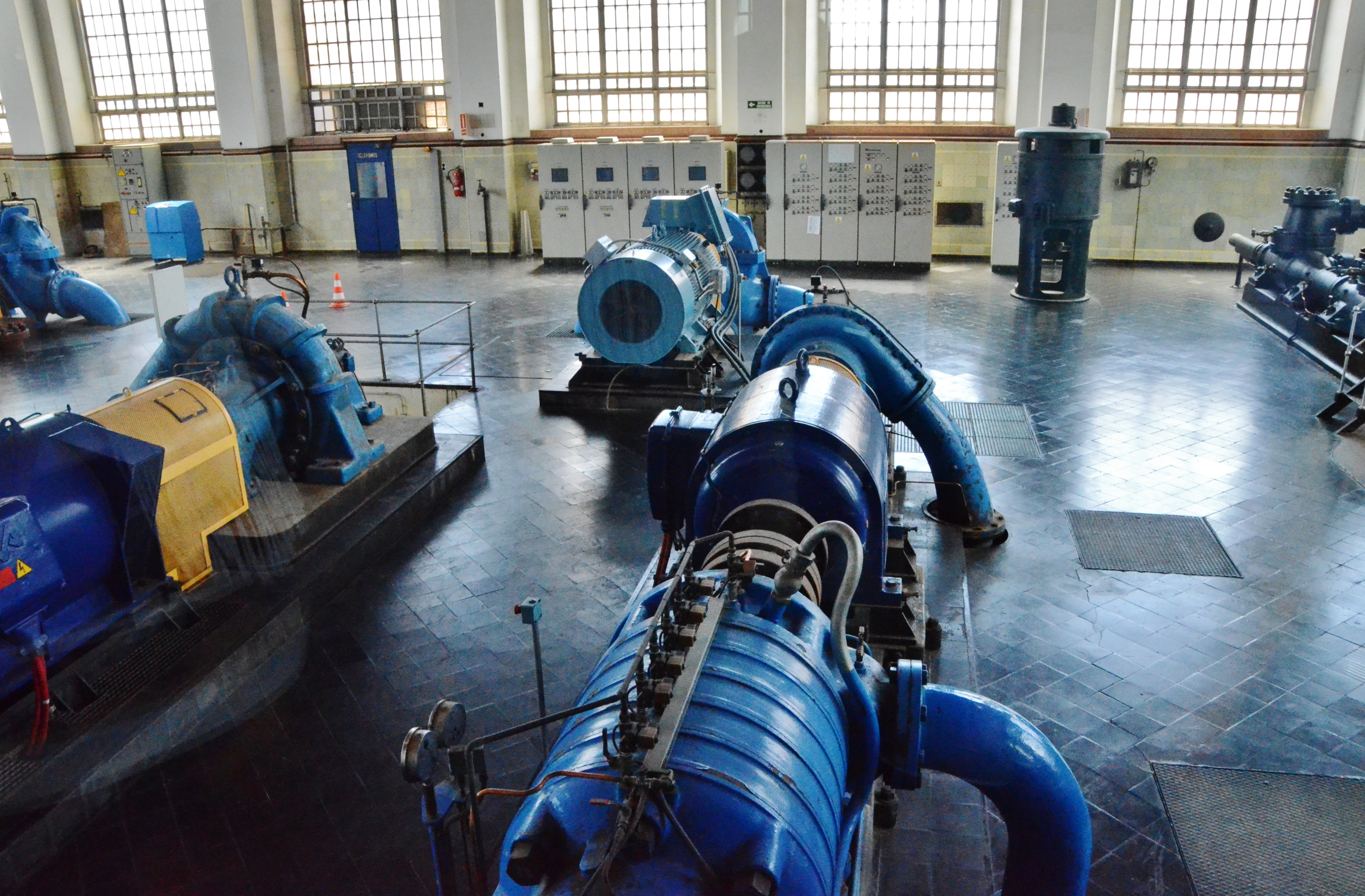

The Museu Agbar de les Aigües is a fresh water pumping station and a museum in Cornellà de Llobregat, Barcelona, Catalonia, Spain. The museum is an Anchor point on the European Route of Industrial Heritage.

== Context ==
The plant was designed to raise water from the Llobregat aquifer. The museum interprets water and its properties, the history of water extraction and distribution. On site there is lots of machinery including the 1909 stationary steam engines.
