= Knappenrode energy museum =

Coordinates: 51.396°N 14.328°E

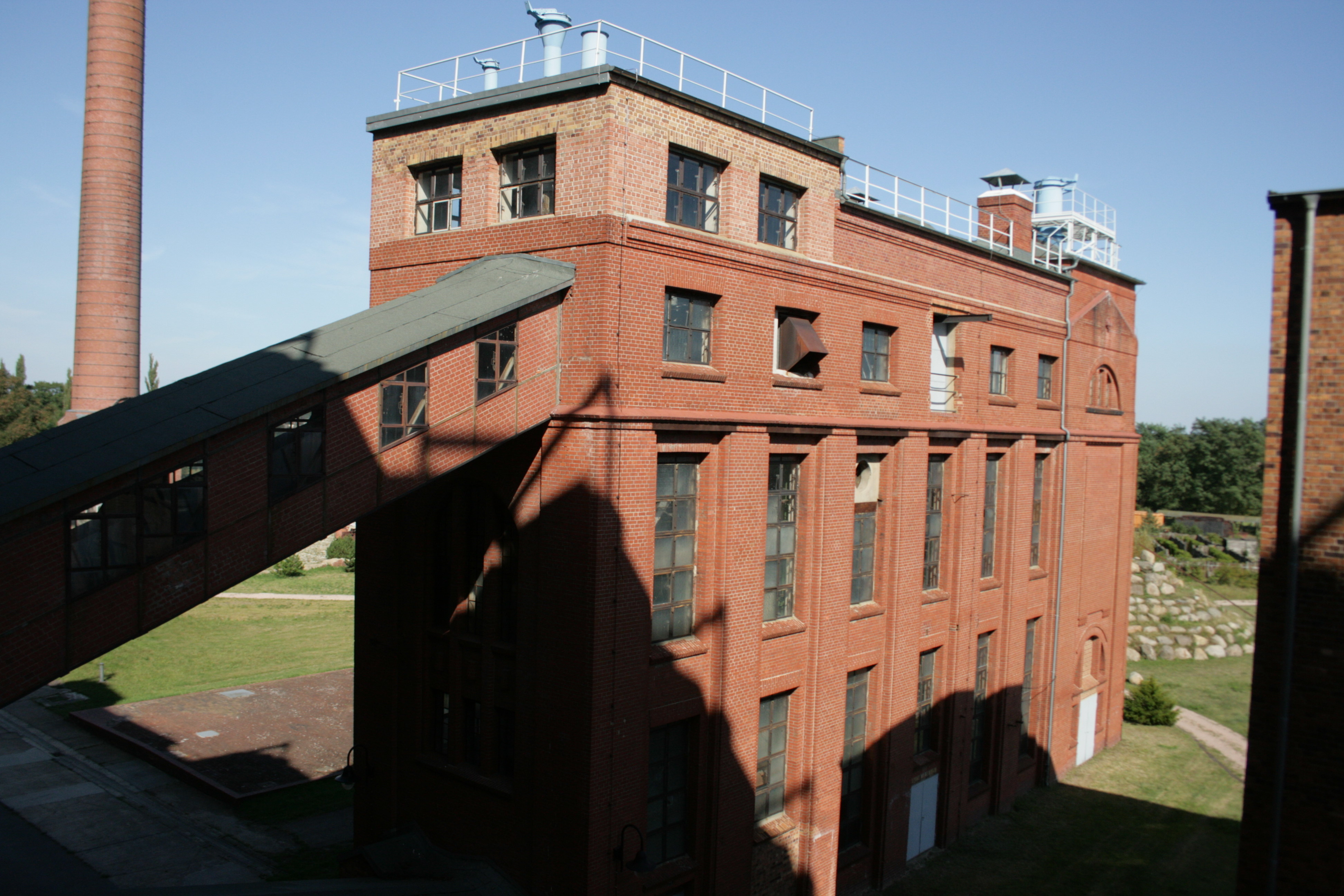

The Knappenrode energy museum is a museum in Hoyerswerda, Saxony Germany. The museum is an Anchor point on the European Route of Industrial Heritage.

== Context ==
Knappenrode is a monument to brown coal. Around 1914 the natural landscape of heathland and coniferous forest was replaced by this vast open cast brown coal mining operation and briquetting plants. The workers dwelt in a specially-erected housing outside the factory gates. This was a true factory village- the company owned the houses, the store, a guest house, a community centre and a railway station. It provided the village with a company owned cemetery. The workers and families used the factory bathhouse so the houses needed no bathrooms. When retired, they came back and used the bathhouse on Saturday nights.

== History ==
A briquetting plant, the "Eintracht Werke," was built in 1914. It was managed by Joseph Werminghoff. Production began in October 1918, and two other plants were then built. After 1945 the plant was renamed "Glückauf", some equipment removed and production continued. In 1965 the plant turned out more than one and a half million tons of briquettes. Modernisation was neglected and the plant stagnated and closed in 1993, leaving a legacy of historic machines that form the nucleus of a museum collection.
