= Ziegelei Lage =

Museum in Lage, Germany

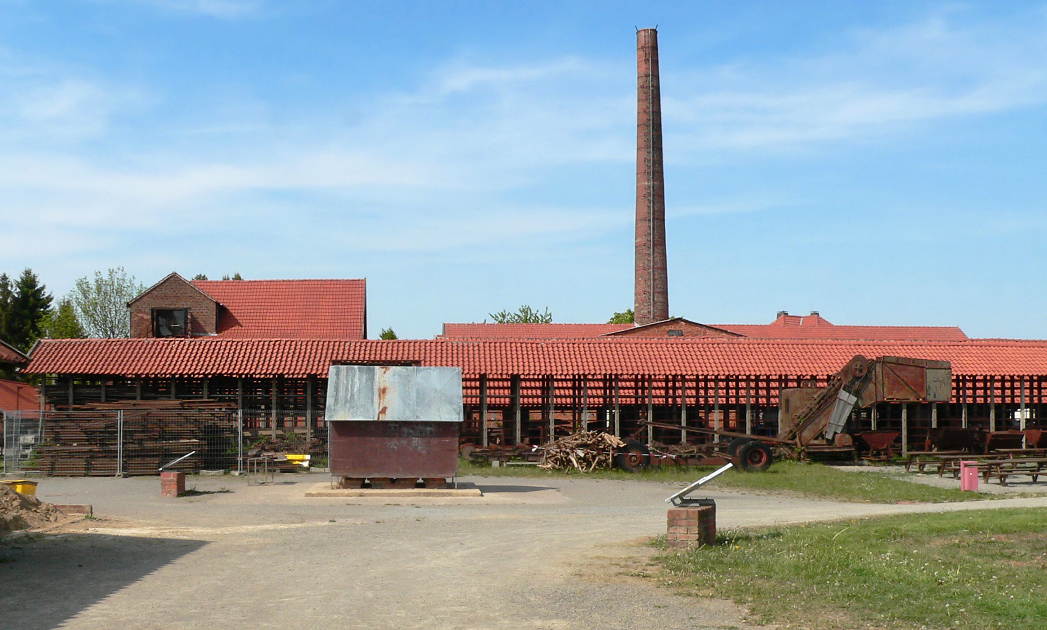
- Established: 2001
- Location: Lage, North Rhine-Westphalia, Germany
- Coordinates: 52.026°N 8.779°E
- Website: Official website

The Ziegelei Lage was a brickyard in Lage, North Rhine-Westphalia, Germany, that was founded in 1909 and closed in 1979.

The initial production of the bricks was done without any machines. The first machines were installed in 1922, after which more machines were gradually added.

Today, the brickyard is a historical museum that demonstrates the production of bricks. The machines are turned on twice a year, and used to form about 10,000 bricks each time. This "festival", where visitors can observe and make bricks themselves, is called "Gut Brand". The bricks are cured by the traditional method in the Hoffmann'schen circular kiln.

The museum also includes a small house that visitors can enter, that demonstrates how families lived in the time that the brickyard was open. The house includes articles such as a Pickert on a wall and old tools.

The Ziegelei Lage is the central point for the European Route of Industrial Heritage.
