= Michal Mine =

Historic coal mine turned museum in Ostrava, Czech Republic

Coordinates: 49.8423°N 18.3406°E

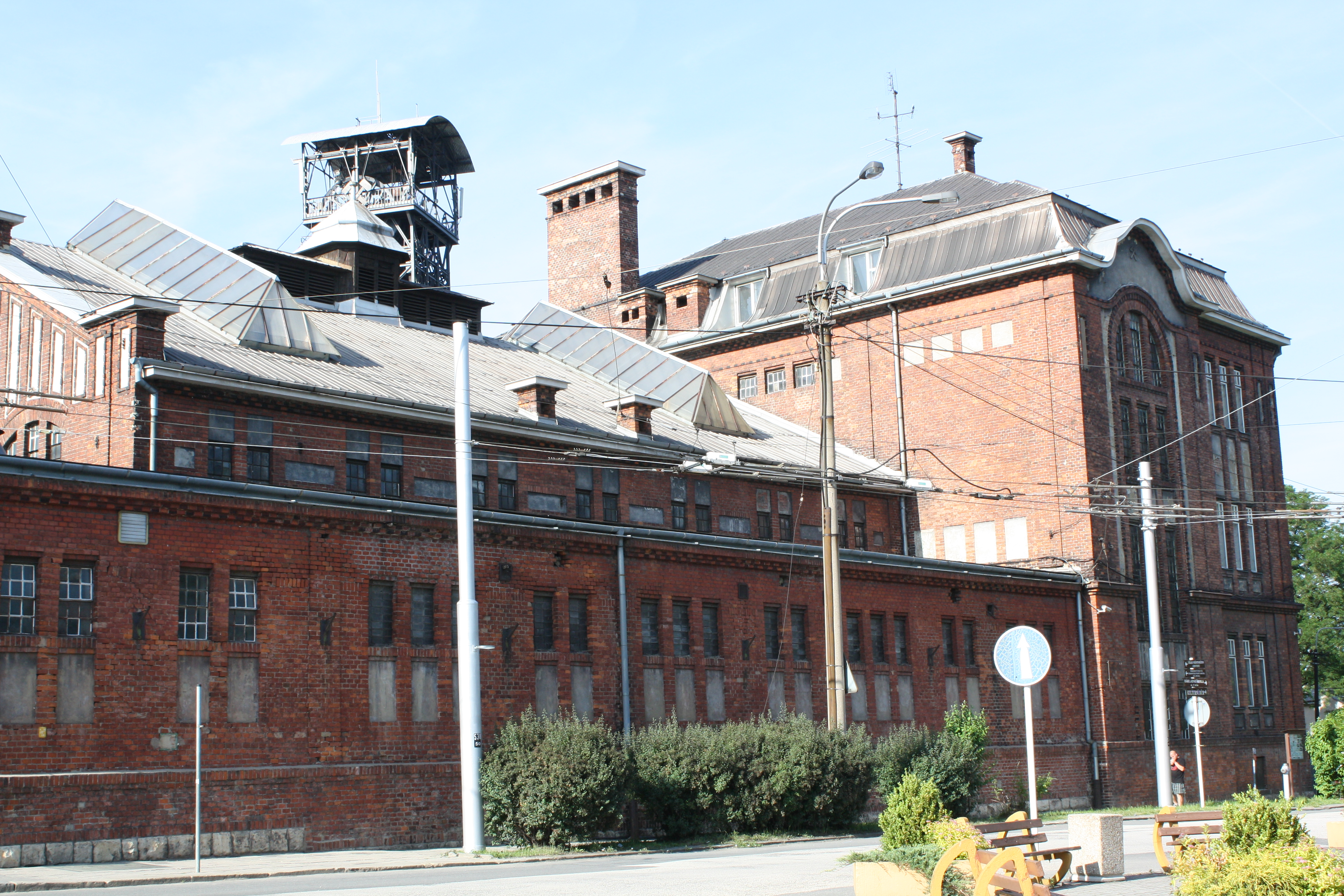
Side view

The Michal Mine (Czech: důl Michal) is a former coal mine and now a museum in Ostrava in the Czech Republic.

It is a museum of mining located in the pit bank of a former hard coal mine. The museum is an Anchor point on the European Route of Industrial Heritage. The buildings have been preserved as they looked at the turn of the 20th century. The area was declared a national cultural monument in 1995.

== History ==
Michal Mine was sunk in 1843; it was remodelled in the 1910s to accommodate the change caused by electricity, compressors and rotating converters were put into operation here in 1912. Little was modernised. The mine was closed in 1993.

== Museum ==
The museum displays the above ground areas that a miner would have been familiar with, including the dressing rooms, washrooms, registry, dispatching, and most importantly, the machine room, with its original and unique equipment that had worked from 1912 until 1993, when the mine was permanently closed.
