= Brick Works De Panoven =

Dutch brick museum

Coordinates: 51.9185°N 6.0673°E

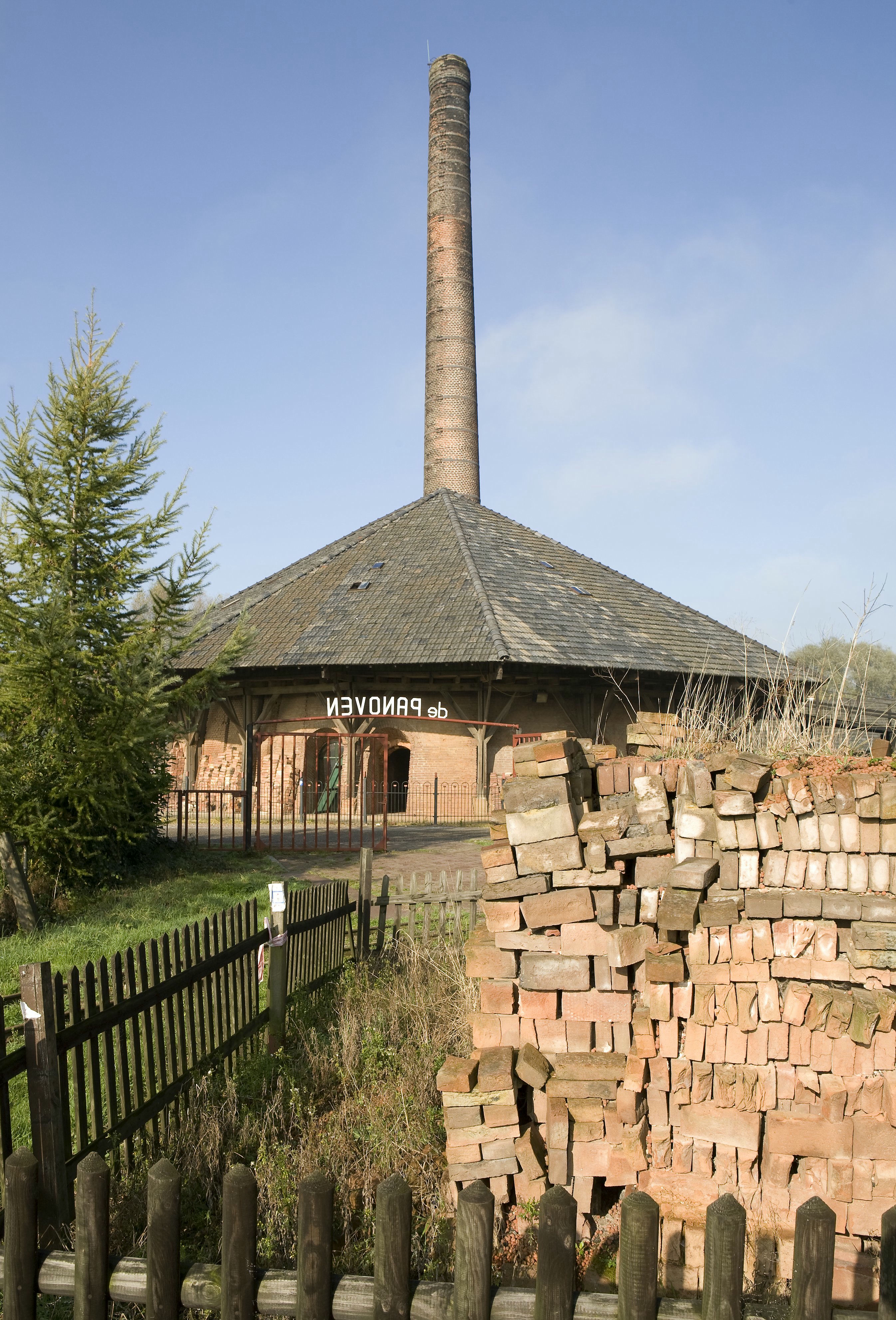
Brick Works De Panoven

The Brick Works De Panoven is a brick museum in Zevenaar, the Gelderland, the Netherlands. The museum is an Anchor point on the European Route of Industrial Heritage. It is also a rijksmonument (number 338309).

== History ==
There was a kiln in Zevenaar when it received its charter in 1487 . The region has large natural supplies of clay. Nijmegen had used tiles from Zevenaar since 1583. Brickmakers expanded beyond the borders of the town. De Panoven was set up in 1860; continuing the tradition. It started with a single shaft kiln then expanded embracing new technology. In 1901 De Panoven began supplying the first machine-made roof tiles and bricks and 20 years later the first drying sheds were built. The last innovation was the zigzag kiln erected in 1926. This basically operated like a ring kiln, but could be continually fired, saving on fuel. This kiln is the sole remaining intact model in Western Europe. The business was closed in 1982.

== Museum ==
The museum displays clay pits (De Gelderse Poort) with their interesting biotope. There is also the kiln and opportunity to make hand-made bricks using an old Aberson cascade handform press
