= Saxon Museum of Industry =

Museum in Chemnitz, Germany

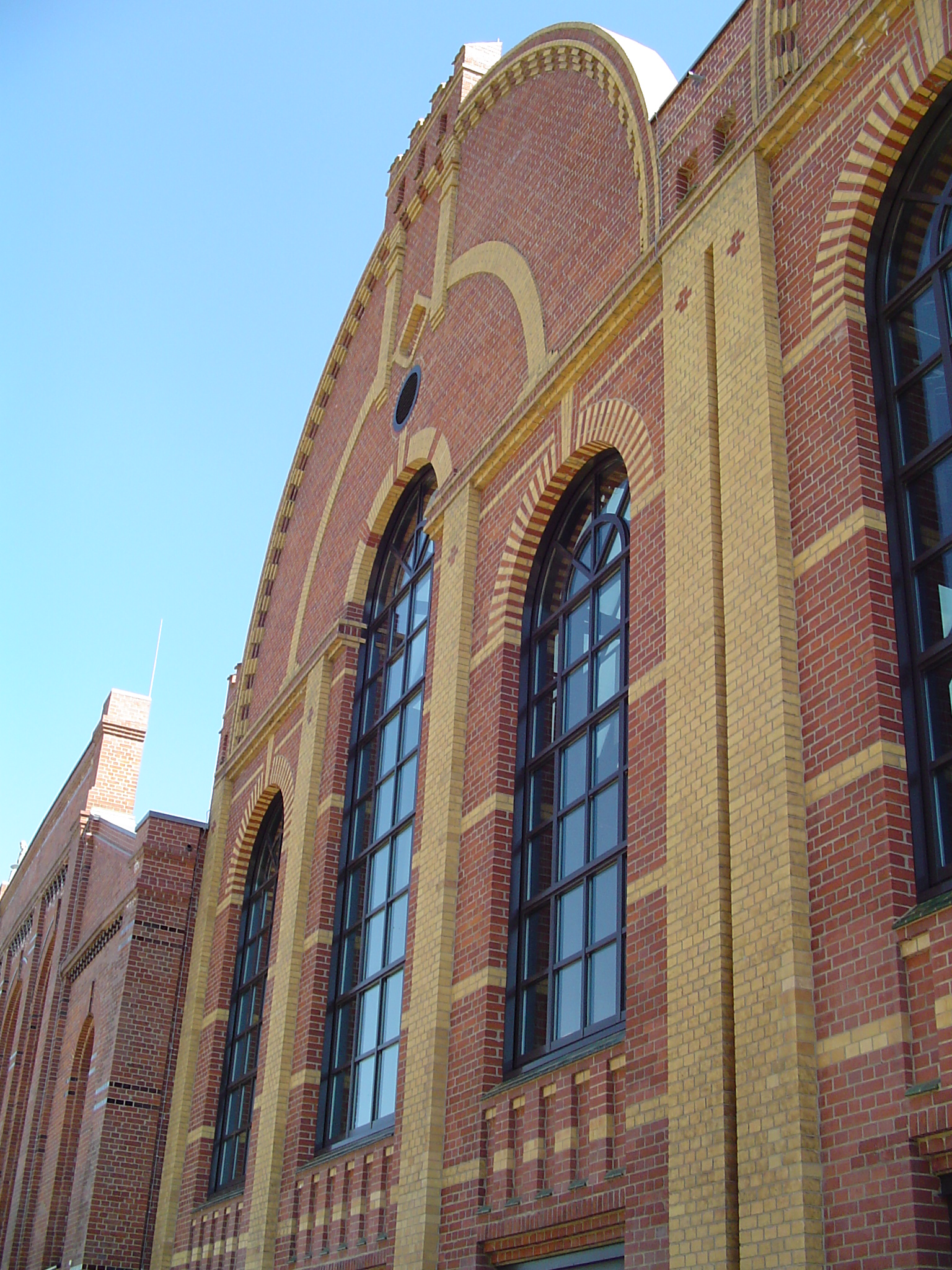
Chemnitz Museum of Industry

The Saxon Museum of Industry is a museum with four locations in Saxony. It is organised as a "special purpose association" (German: Zweckverband), the members of which are the towns of Chemnitz, Crimmitschau, Ehrenfriedersdorf and Hoyerswerda.

The Chemnitz Tar Mummy is a mummified human body which has been on display at the museum since 2003.

== Work of the museum ==
Within the scope of researching and presenting the industrial and economic history of Saxony, the association's remit includes collecting and preserving cultural artefacts, preserving Saxony's industrial heritage, and using the buildings as museums.

== Individual museums ==
The individual museums of the association are:

Chemnitz Museum of Industry (50.8242°N 12.9003°E)

Exhibits include Saxony, its industrialists, its workforce, creativity, consumers, textile manufacture, and motor car engines.

West Saxon Textile Museum in Crimmitschau (50.8290°N 12.3882°E)

Exhibits include the buildings themselves, a complete historic textile factory owned by the Pfau brothers (producing woollens from 1885); the original looms and other machinery for preparing wool for weaving; and a detailed timeline with photographs.

Ehrenfriedersdorf Tin Mine (50.6428°N 12.9745°E)

Exhibits include the tin mine itself, where visitors can travel down to a depth of 100 metres; a collection of over 1000 minerals; medicinal galleries; and a jewel grindery.

Knappenrode Energy Factory (51.3968°N 14.3268°E)

Exhibits include the Lausitz Mining Museum, a century-old brick factory and powerstation; treasures of the earth; the pit's fire brigade and rescue team; fireplaces; lignite and the environment; mine surveying; diggers, locomotives and railways; pit head frames and underground clearances; and living beside the factory gates.

The museums present Saxon industrial history in different ways: as a conventional museum, a textile factory, a "show" mine, and a special museum for the whole spectrum of Saxon industry, from mining via the textile industry and textile machinery manufacture, to machine tool manufacture.

== Reception ==
By April 2003, the Chemnitz museum had welcomed 500,000 paying visitors. In 2008, Freie Presse reported that although the Chemnitz museum had had its best year with up to 100,000 visitors, its future remained uncertain with arguments over its funding. A compromise suggested additional European Social Fund money, tied to education projects. The museum hosted a design exhibition in 2010.

== Awards ==
In 2005 the Saxon Museum of Industry in Chemnitz was given a Special Commendation of the European Museum Forum.

== Notable exhibits ==
=== Chemnitz Tar Mummy ===
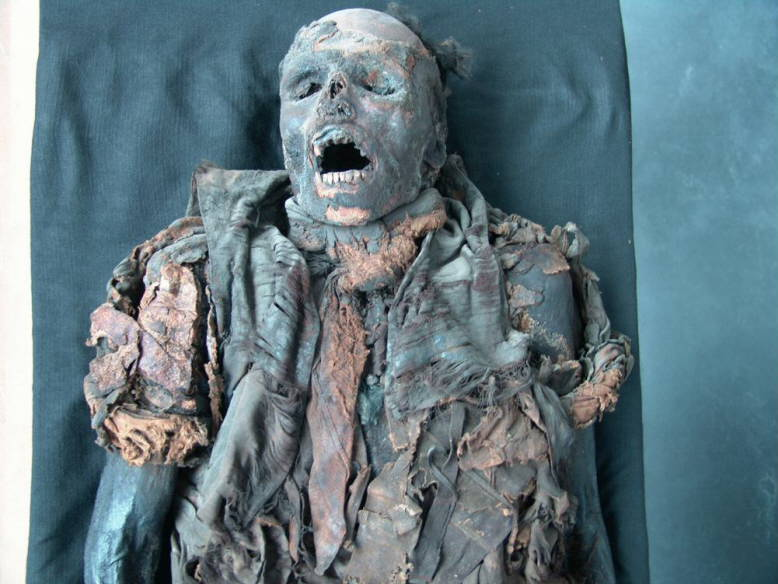
Chemnitz Tar Mummy

The Chemnitz Tar Mummy is a mummified human body which has been on display at the Saxon Museum of Industry in Chemnitz since 2003.

In 1884 a body of an unknown, 1.66 m tall workman was found in a tar container of the Chemnitz Gasworks 1. The cause of his death could not be ascertained. Because there were no signs of violence found in his body, the man was buried in the ground. After 23 years, in 1907, the body was exhumed for re-examination at the Institute of Forensic Medicine in Leipzig. A further examination revealed that the body was completely mummified.

Because of tar, a gas plant byproduct, and its preserving action on the body and the working clothes, the Chemnitz Tar Mummy is well preserved to this day.
