= Houldsworth Model Village =

Coordinates: 53.437°N 2.165°W

Houldsworth Model Village was a model village situated in the centre of Reddish, 3 miles north of Stockport in the North of England. It was built by William Houldsworth, for the benefit of his employees at Houldsworth Mills.

The first of Houldsworth's mills was completed in 1865. In 1874 work was completed on an institute, which is still standing and now called Houldsworth Working Men's Club. The institute was designed by architect Abraham Henthorn Stott who also designed Houldsworth's Mills, however it was a different architect, Alfred Waterhouse who designed St Elisabeth's church, rectory and school, which were built shortly after. Alfred Waterhouse had just carried out extensive improvements on William Houldsworth's newly acquired home of Coodham Estate in Kilmarnock.

Directly opposite the front of the mill a series of houses were built on Houldsworth Street. These were to be the largest and grandest of all the houses built as part of the model village. They were for the mill's managers and foreman and was nicknamed by the other works as 'nob row'. These houses and the ones on Liverpool Street are the only remaining dwellings from the original model village.
