= Grete Mildenberg =

German politician

Grete Mildenberg (born Grete Hill: 5 January 1902) was a German politician (KPD).

== Life ==
Grete Hill was born into a working-class family in Elbing, an industrial town in West Prussia roughly equidistant between Danzig and Königsberg. She attended school locally and then moved to Berlin to find a job. There she married Walter Mildenberg, a Jewish businessman. She also joined the recently established Communist Party. During 1929/30 she represented her party as a member of the Berlin city council. Then, in September 1930, she was one of 77 communists elected to the national parliament (Reichstag). She was one of the party's 54 directly elected candidates, representing Electoral District 4 (Potsdam). She remained a member of the Reichstag till July 1932.

In 1931 Grete Mildenberg was sentenced for a serious Breach of the peace to an eight-month prison term by the district court in central Berlin. In January 1933 the Nazis took power and lost no time in transforming Germany into a one-party dictatorship. Following the Reichstag fire at the end of February the authorities took a particular "interest" in members of the Communist Party. Party activity became, by definition, illegal, but Mildenberg continued to be politically active "underground". She was arrested in 1933. In 1938 Grete Mildenberg, her husband and their son who had been born in 1935, left Germany for Belgium. Later they emigrated either to the United States of America or to South America. Their subsequent fate is unknown.
