= Grossouvre =

- Commune
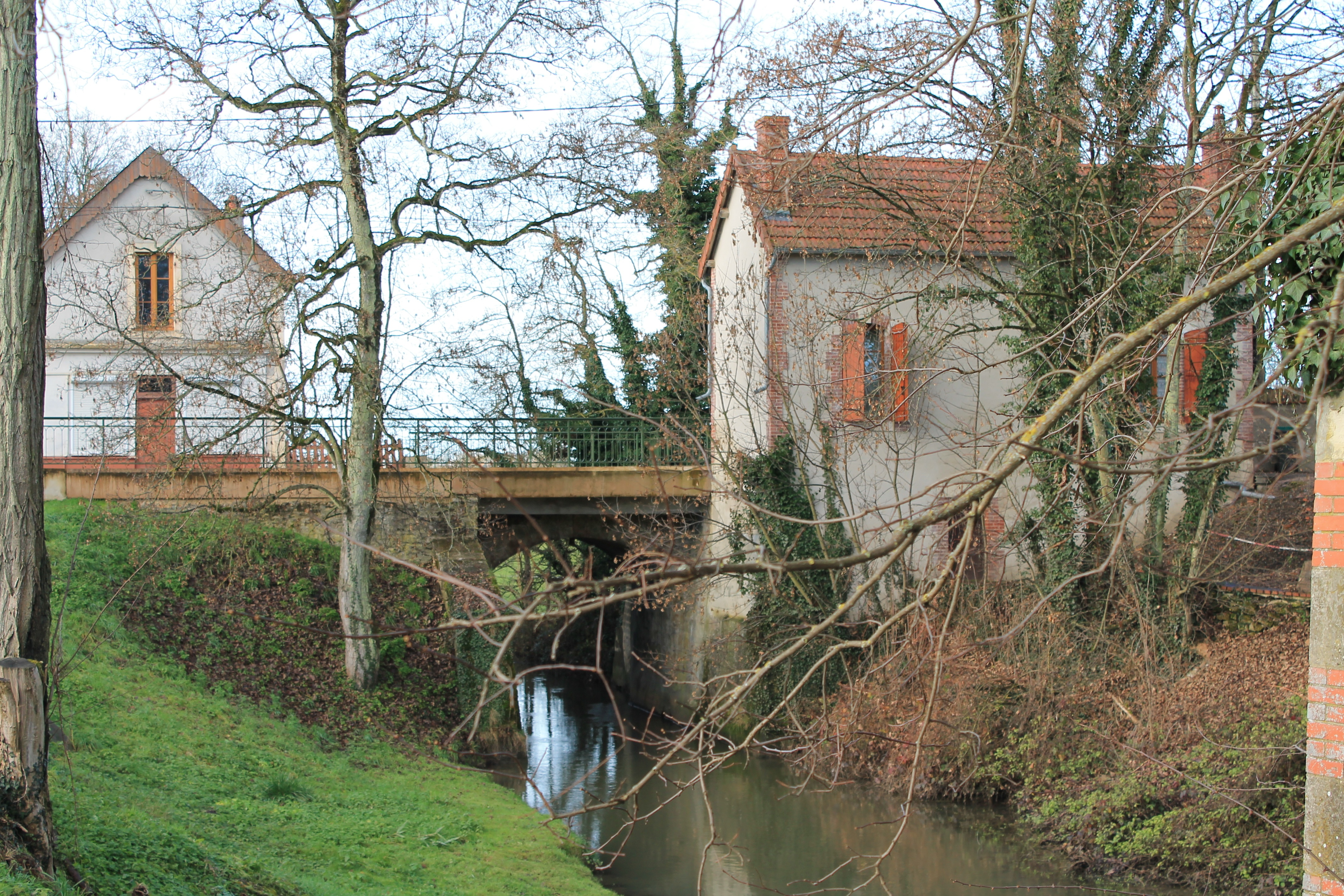
- A house and bridge in Grossouvre

- Coat of arms
- Location of Grossouvre
- Location within France Location within Centre-Val de Loire
- Coordinates: 46°52′46″N 2°56′17″E
- Country: France
- Region: Centre-Val de Loire
- Department: Cher
- Arrondissement: Saint-Amand-Montrond
- Canton: Dun-sur-Auron
- Intercommunality: CC Les Trois Provinces

Government
  - Mayor (2023–2026): Robert Chollet
- Area^{1}: 15.75 km^{2} (6.08 sq mi)
- Elevation: 206 m (676 ft)
- Highest elevation: 230 m (750 ft)
- Lowest elevation: 182 m (597 ft)
- Population (2023): 264
  - Density: 16.8/km^{2} (43.4/sq mi)
- Time zone: UTC+01:00 (CET)
  - Summer (DST): UTC+02:00 (CEST)
- INSEE/Postal code: 18106 /18600
- ^{1} French Land Register data, which excludes lakes, ponds, glaciers > 1 km^{2} (0.386 sq mi or 247 acres) and river estuaries.

Grossouvre (French pronunciation: [ɡʁɔsuvʁ]) is a commune in the Cher department in the Centre-Val de Loire region of France.

== Geography ==
A village of farming, forestry and a little light industry situated by the banks of both the Aubois river and the canal de Berry some 23 miles (37 km) southeast of Bourges at the junction of the D76, D78 and the D920 roads.

== Sights ==
- The nineteenth-century church of St. Pierre
- The chateau, built over a castle dating from the twelfth century
- The Espace Métal - Halle de Grossouvre museum of industry

== See also ==
- Communes of the Cher department
