= Guido Mine and Coal Mining Museum =

Historic mine and museum in Zabrze, Poland

Guido Mine
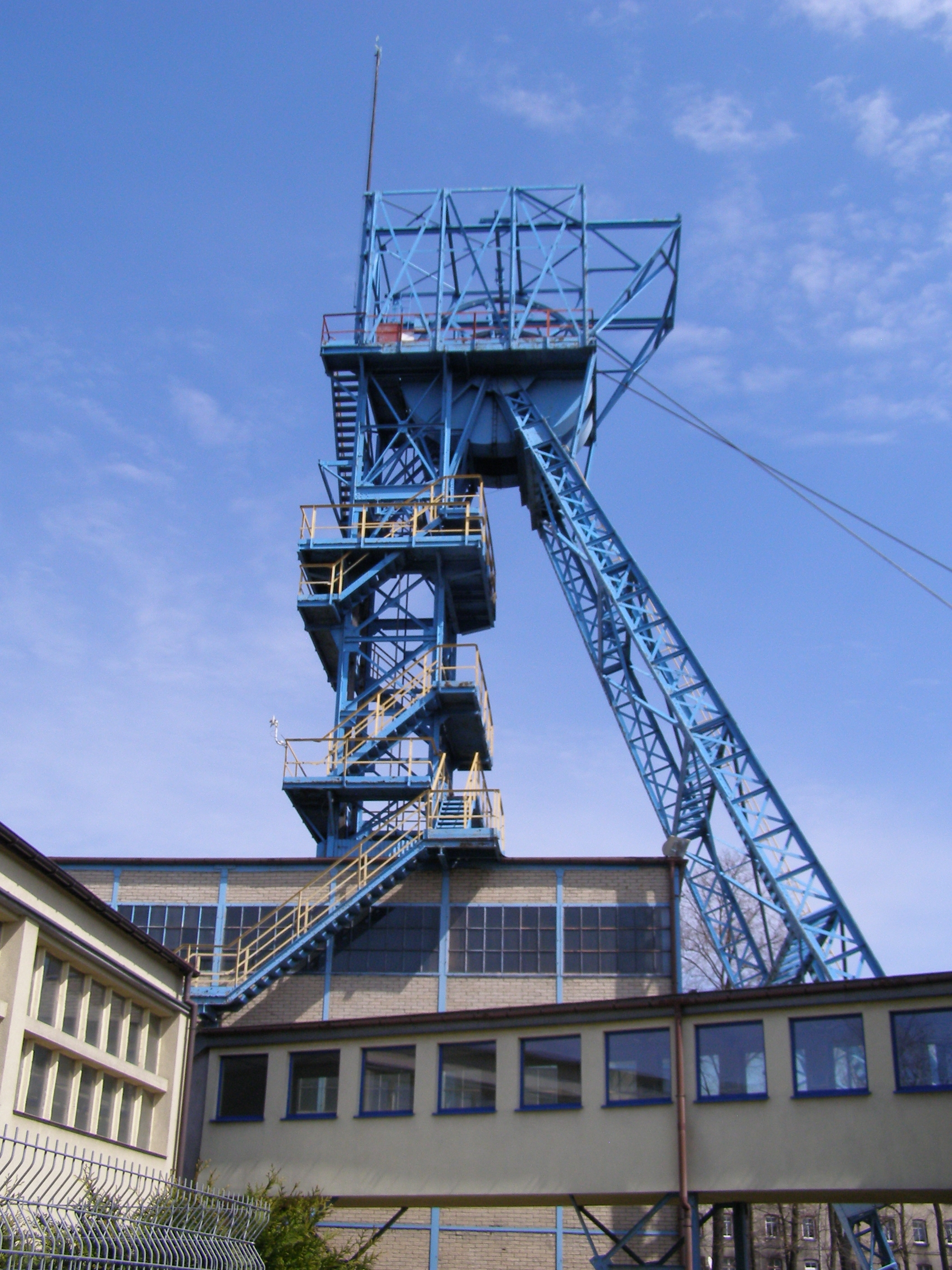
- Guido Mine shaft

- Location within Poland
- Location: Zabrze, Poland; 50.2896°N 18.7871°E
- Products: bituminous coal
- Opened: 1855
- Closed: 1996

Historic Monument of Poland
- Designated: 2020-07-14
- Part of: Zabrze – historic coal mine complex
- Reference no.: Dz. U. z 2020 r. poz. 1288

The Guido mine (Polish: Kopalnia Guido, formerly Zabytkowa Kopalnia Węgla Kamiennego) is a historic deep coal mine and museum in Zabrze, Silesia, Poland. The museum is an Anchor point on the European Route of Industrial Heritage. This is an object of cultural heritage inscribed in the registry of the Silesian Voivodeship (A/1342/87 z 1987-02-26) and a cultural monument in Poland (ID 641754).

== History ==
The Guido mine was set up in 1855 by Guido Henckel von Donnersmarck (1830-1916) to provide coal for the Donnersmarck mills. Maximum production was in 1885 when 312,976 tonnes of coal were cut. When the coal was worked out it continued to draw water from adjacent mines. This function declined in the 1930s and the mine closed in 1960. In 1967 the colliery it reopen as a test mine for colliery machines. It 1987 the site was given listed status. Shortly before, in 1982, an open-air museum had been set up on the surface site: that closed in 1996. The current visitor mine museum opened to 170m in 2007 and to the full 320m in 2008.

Technically the early mine had to contend with sand and the Saara tectonic fault. The first shaft, the 1856 Barbara shaft was abandoned at 30m. The second shaft, the Concordia shaft was renamed the Guido shaft. Exploratory mining at 80m was abandoned due to faulting. At 117m water was struck. Financial assistance was received from the Upper Silesian Railway Association (German: Oberschlesische Eisenbahn Gesellschaft). Guido was drained, and a new shaft, the Railway shaft was dug- the 170m level was exploited using shortwall excavation. The workings were bought in 1887 by the Prussian Finanzamt- and merge with the Queen Louisa Mine. Guido and Railway were deeped to 320m, the 170m had been worked out. In 1912 the Guido mine was merged with the newly built Delbrück mine (Makoszowy Coal Mine-post 1945) and coking plant. Silesia was partitioned in 1922, and the Delbrück mine (with “Guido” mine) was made over to Prussian Preussag mining company. In 1928, the Guido shaft was closed down and the Railway shaft became transporting shaft for the crew and materials.

== Museum ==
The underground museum is 320m beneath the surface, with a second level representing a 19th-century mine at 170m. 320m makes it the deepest visitor mine in Europe. It exploits the black coal vein of No.620 coal seam It has on display an Alpina tunnelling machine, AM 50 longwall cutter-loader. the 250 tonnes coal containers, the conveyor belts and the suspended railway. It has simulations of mining disasters, and a concert hall. There is also an exhibition dedicated to the Politically Repressed Soldier-Miners of the 1950s, youngsters forced to work underground instead of doing military service. (Note: Konstantin Rokossovsky ordered conscripted soldiers to work in the minesas there were to few available. In practice the order was directed at politically awkward youth of military age. This decision affected up to 200,000 young people, of whom over 1,000 lost their lives.)
