= Bagger 1473 =

Abandoned bucket-wheel excavator

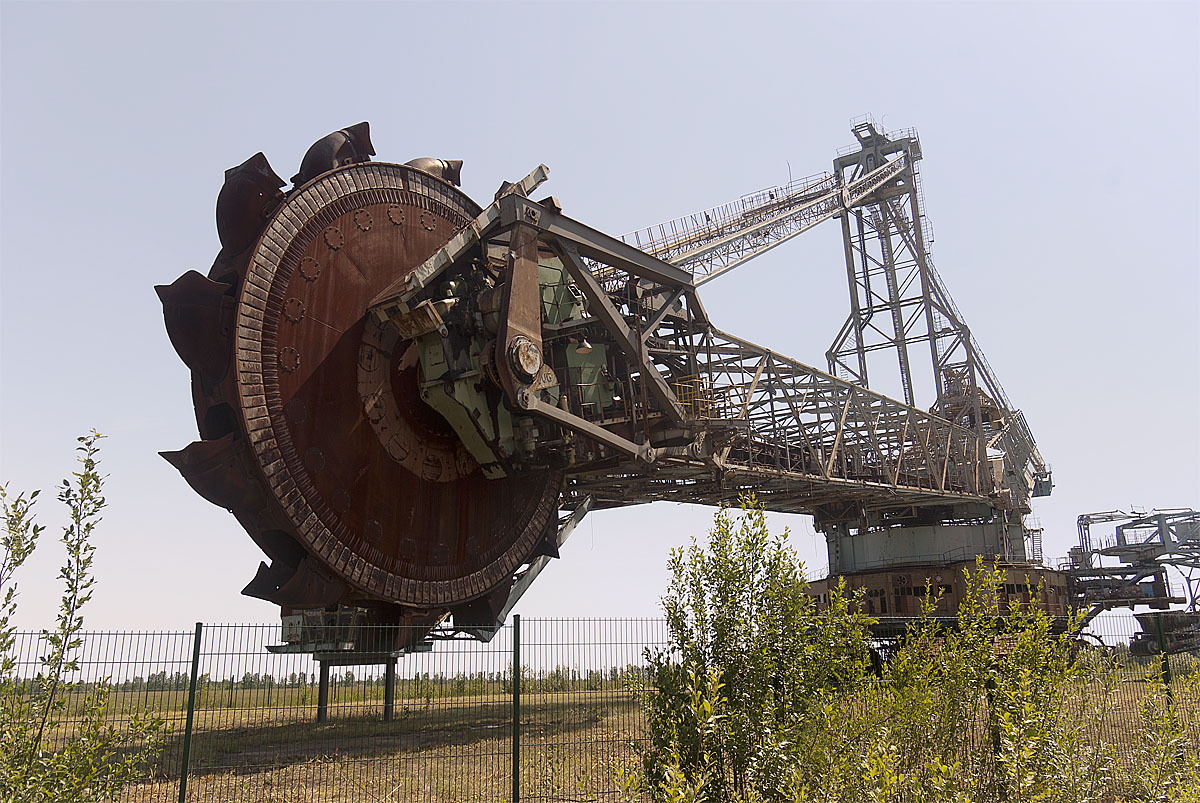
- Interactive map of the Bagger 1473 area

General information
- Status: Abandoned
- Location: Lange Straße 71, Schipkau, Germany
- Coordinates: 51°32′06.9″N 13°56′59.0″E
- Completed: 1965
- Closed: 2002
- Owner: Local municipalities

Height
- Height: 50 m

Dimensions
- Weight: 3850 t

Bagger 1473 (christened as The Blue Wonder) is a Type SRs 1500-series bucket-wheel excavator prototype left abandoned in a field in the municipality of Schipkau in Germany.

== Technical data ==
The bucket wheel excavator had a power of 5555 kW during operation and was supplied with a 6 kV power cable.

Overall, the bucket wheel excavator is about 50 meters high and about 171.5 meters long. The six-section crawler undercarriage, with a maximum travel speed of 6 meters per minute, carries the total mass of 3850 tons.

With 10 buckets of 1.5 cubic meters each and 57 pours per minute (known as the pour rate), the excavator achieves a theoretical mining capacity of 5130 cubic meters per hour. The bucket wheel diameter is 12.5 meters and the cutting speed is 3.73 meters per second.

The design of the wheel boom, with a length of 67 meters, enables an excavation height of up to 35 meters and an excavation depth of up to 15 meters.

== History ==
The excavator was used at the Tagebau Meuro mine from 1965 to 2002.

After it was withdrawn from service, the municipalities Senftenberg, Großräschen, and Schipkau decided on a joint action to preserve the opencast mining machine. Between 29 August to 15 September 2003, Bagger 1473 was moved approximately 8.5 kilometres (5.3 mi) from the Meuro mine to near the EuroSpeedway Lausitz, where it would serve as a monument to the area's former lignite mining. The machine was moved across industrial roads and railways owned by the LMBV but public traffic was not affected.

When Bagger 1473 became popular with the urban explorers, it was misidentified as Bagger 258 because of markings found on its information plate.

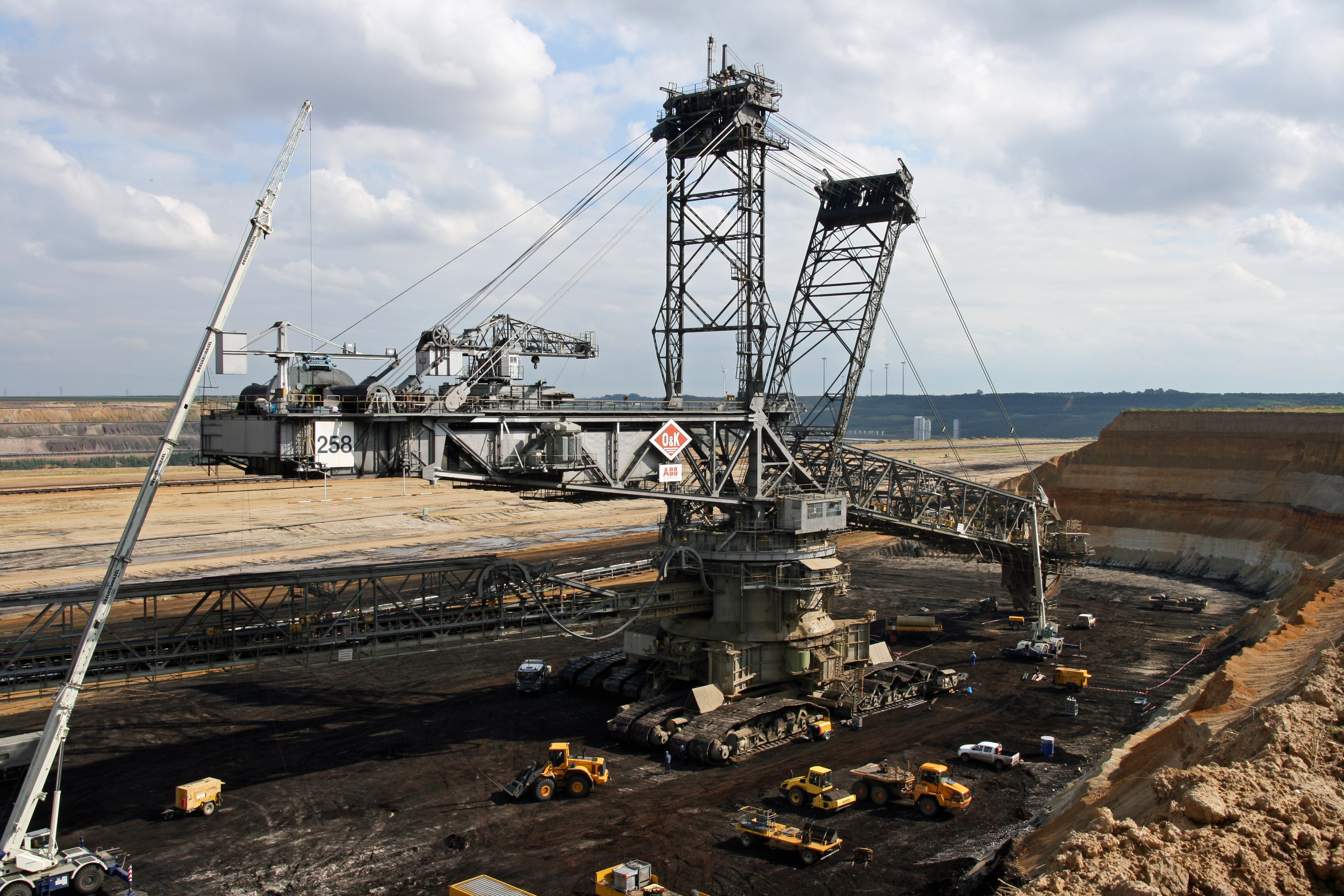
Bagger 258 at Tagebau Garzweiler

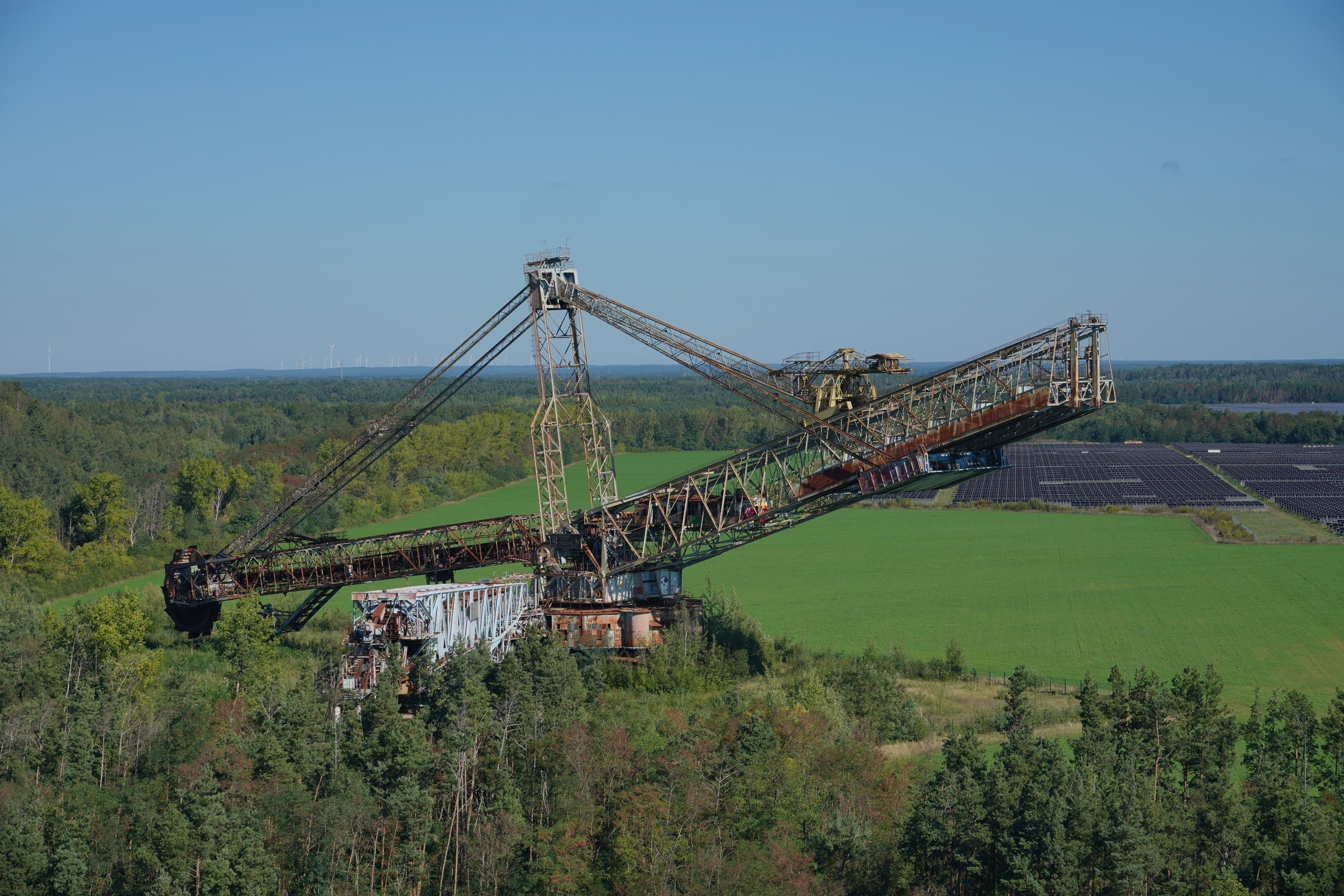
Bagger 1473

== Scrapping ==
In January 2019 the municipalities that supported its move announced that the excavator was to be scrapped. Their decision was mainly due to the machine's dilapidation and damage. It was financially impossible to maintain and because vandalism and theft had become so extensive, the structure was no longer safe for people. Parts of the excavator would be preserved, such as its wheel.

However, when the Brandenburg Landesamt für Denkmalpflege (State Office for the Preservation of Monuments) and state archaeological museum learned of the planned demolition from news reports, they issued a statement the excavator had acknowledged historical structure protection since 2002/2003. Although at that time, it was simply assumed that it was unnecessary to formally place it on the list of such structures. The fact that the structure was identified as historically significant was considered sufficient to declare it as protected. The Landesamt quickly made it official in February.

Constructive discussions about the future of Bagger 1473 are ongoing with the local municipalities and communities. Despite imminent demolition work being prevented, it remains unclear how the structure can be preserved and who will have financial responsibility.

== See also ==
- Overburden Conveyor Bridge F60
- EuroSpeedway Lausitz
