= Solarpark Senftenberg/Schipkau =

German photovoltaic power station

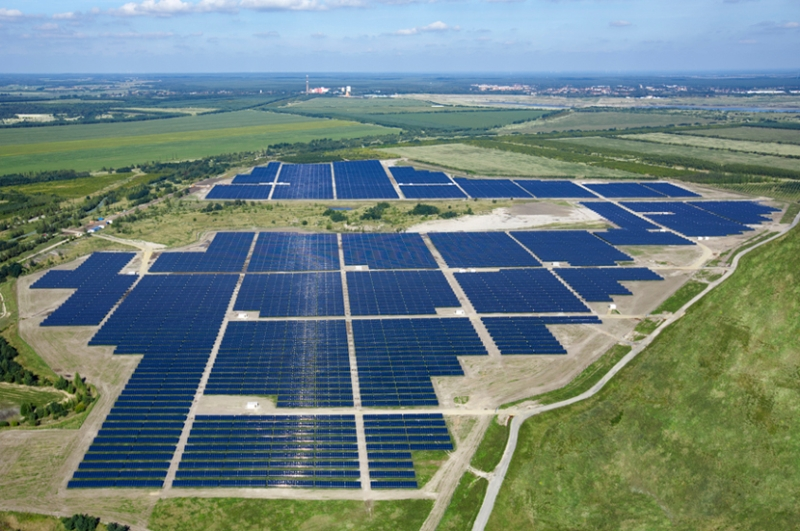
- Country: Germany
- Location: Schipkau, Brandenburg
- Coordinates: 51°32′42″N 13°58′48″E
- Status: Operational
- Commission date: 2011, 2012
- Construction cost: €140 million (first 70 MW)

Solar farm
- Type: Flat-panel PV
- Site area: 200 hectares (494 acres)

Power generation
- Nameplate capacity: 168 MW

External links
- Commons: Related media on Commons

Solarpark Senftenberg/Schipkau is a 166 megawatt (MW) photovoltaic power station located in Germany near the border of Senftenberg and Schipkau (near the village of Meuro). The plant was built on the now closed Meuro lignite mine and is the country's largest solar park. It was named POWER-GEN International solar project of the year in 2012.

The park consist of Solarpark Schipkau (72 MWp), Solarpark Senftenberg I (12 MWp) and Solarpark Senftenberg II & III (78 MWp).

The PV system uses about 636,000 solar panels provided by Canadian Solar and 20k-string inverters from REFUsol. It is also the first solar park to use a 690VAC gridvoltage for some of REFUsol's 333k HV central inverters.

== See also ==
- Energy policy of the European Union
- Photovoltaics
- Renewable energy commercialization
- Renewable energy in the European Union
