= Klettwitz =

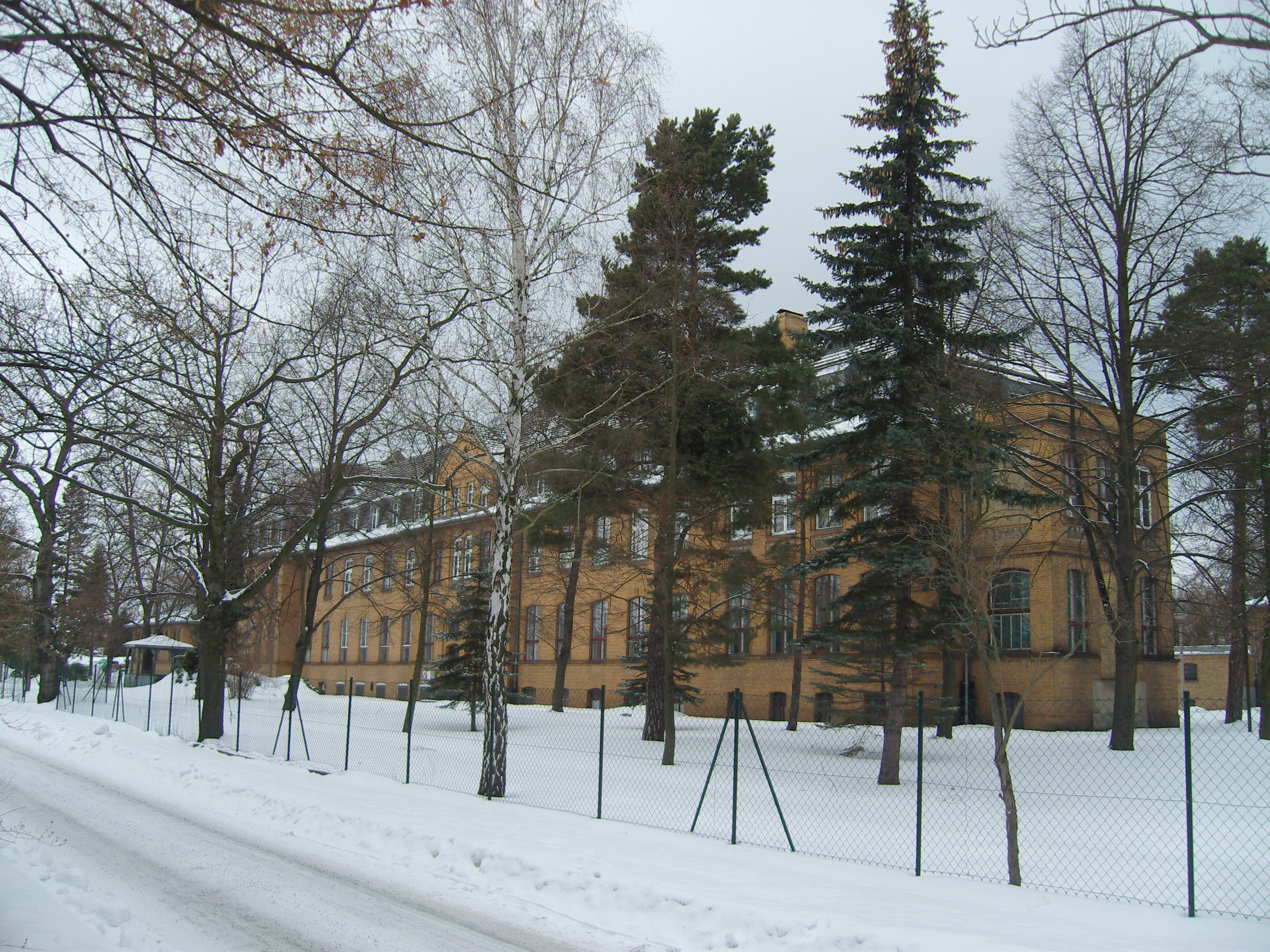
- Local hospital

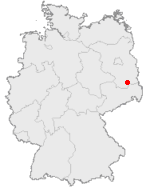
- Coordinates: 51°32′34″N 13°53′42″E
- Country: Germany
- State: Brandenburg
- District: Oberspreewald-Lausitz
- Municipality: Schipkau
- Elevation: 120 m (390 ft)

Population (2000)
  - Total: 1,342
- Demonym: klettwitzer
- Time zone: UTC+1 (CET)
- Postal code: 01998

Klettwitz (Lower Sorbian: Klěśišća; Polish: Kletwice) is a village in the municipality of Schipkau, in Brandenburg, in eastern Germany, situated in the historical region of Lower Lusatia.

== History ==
The village was first mentioned in 1370 with the name of Cleticz. In 1815, it became part of the Kingdom of Prussia, within which was administratively located within the Province of Brandenburg. In 1904, the Sacred Heart church was built, mostly funded by local Poles. In 1910, the settlement reached its peak population of 3,544. In the 1930s, some 550 Poles lived in the village, there were two Polish organizations, and Polish language classes and church services were held.

After World War II, it was part of East Germany, administratively located in the Bezirk Cottbus. Until December 31, 2001, it was an autonomous municipality merged into Schipkau.

== Geography ==
Klettwitz, part of the Lower Lusatia region, is located close to the borders with Saxony, 2 km in north of Schipkau. It is 6 km far from Senftenberg, 50 from Cottbus and 63 from Dresden. It is served by the motorway A13, connecting Dresden with Berlin, at the exit nr. 15 ("Klettwitz").

Some municipal localities (Siedlungsgebiete) are part of the suburb of Klettwitz. They are Herrnmühle (Knězny młyń, seat of the old hospital), Staudemühle (Pušćadłowe młyń), Treuhandsiedlung (Drjewojske sedlišćo) and Wilhelminensglück (Wilhelmincowy Gluki).

The Bergheider See is an artificial lake created in the pit left by the Klettwitz Nord mine.

== Sport ==
Located close to Klettwitz it is the "EuroSpeedway Lausitz", a race track originally named "Lausitzring", opened in 2000.

== Photogallery ==
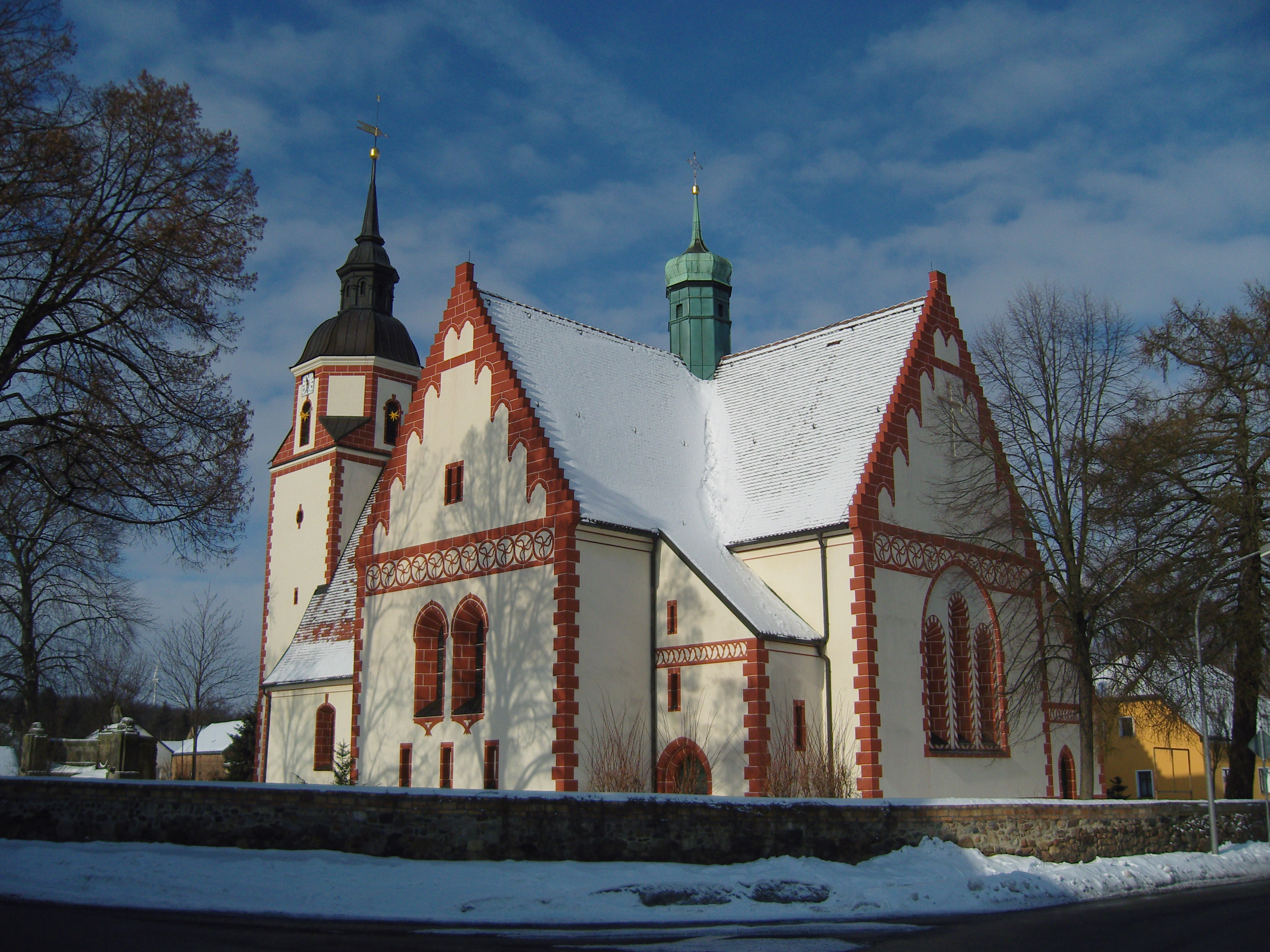
Evangelic church
(Dorfkirche)

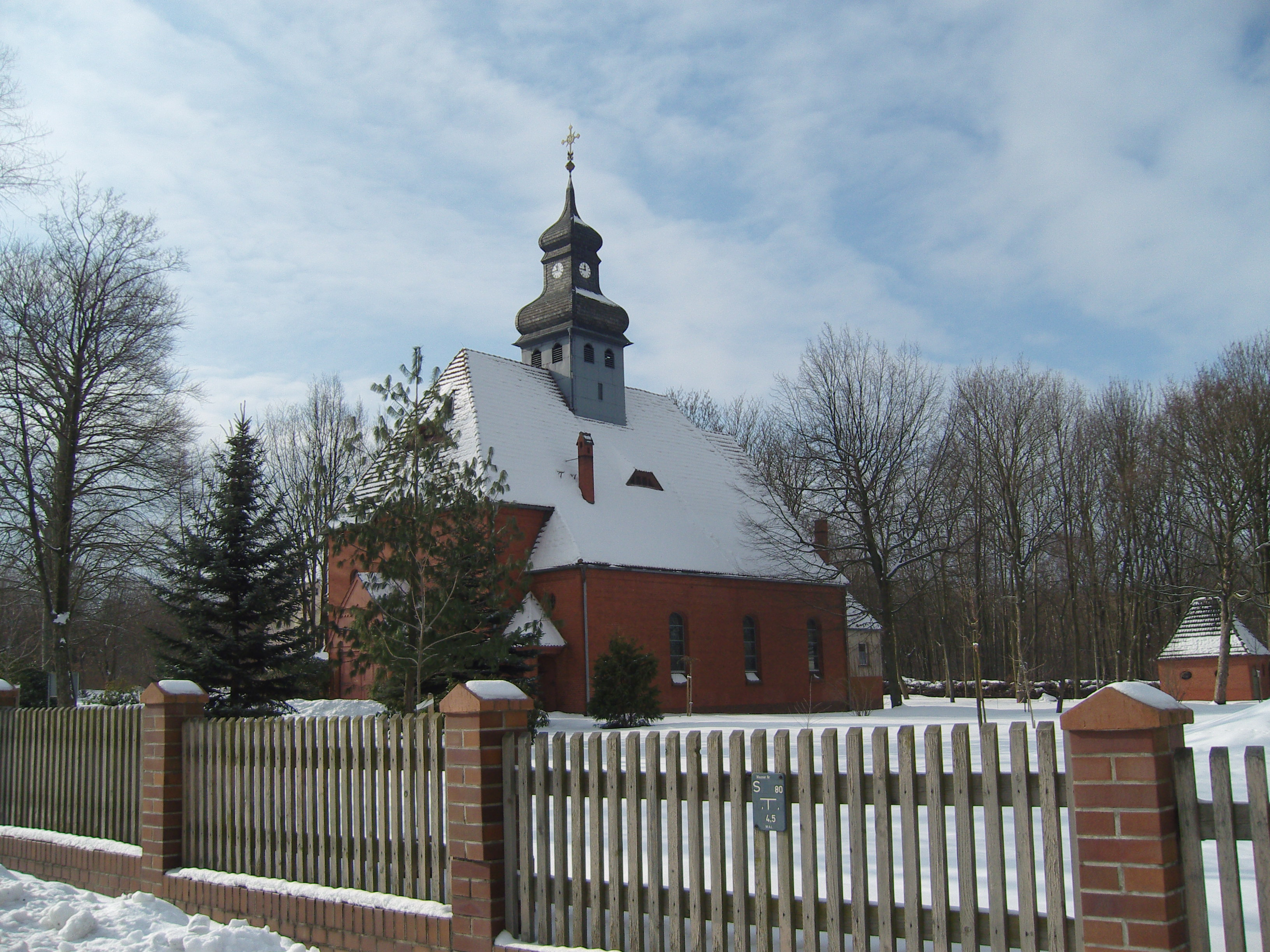
Catholic church
(Herz-Jesus-Kirche)

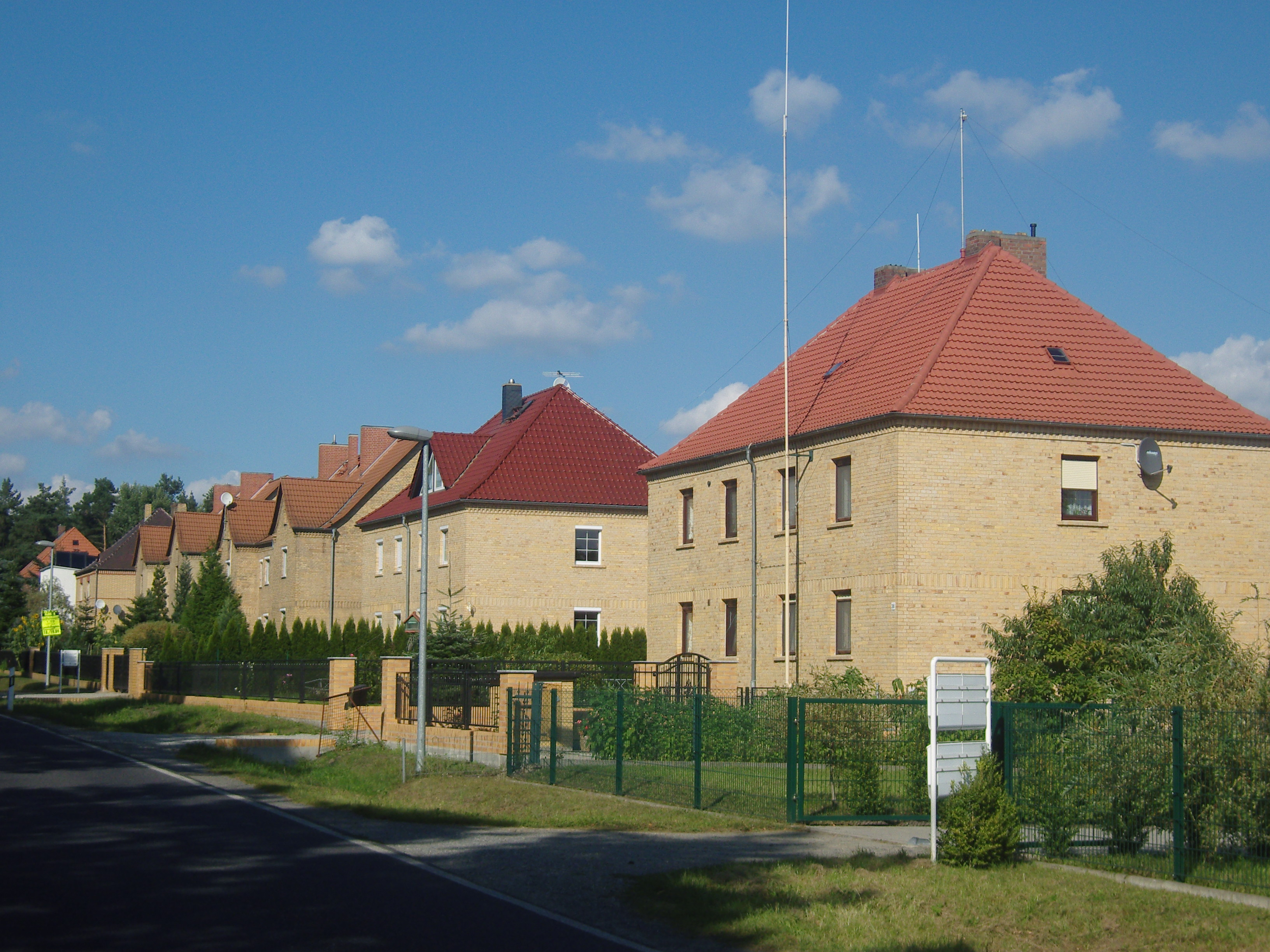
Houses at the Treuhandsiedlung

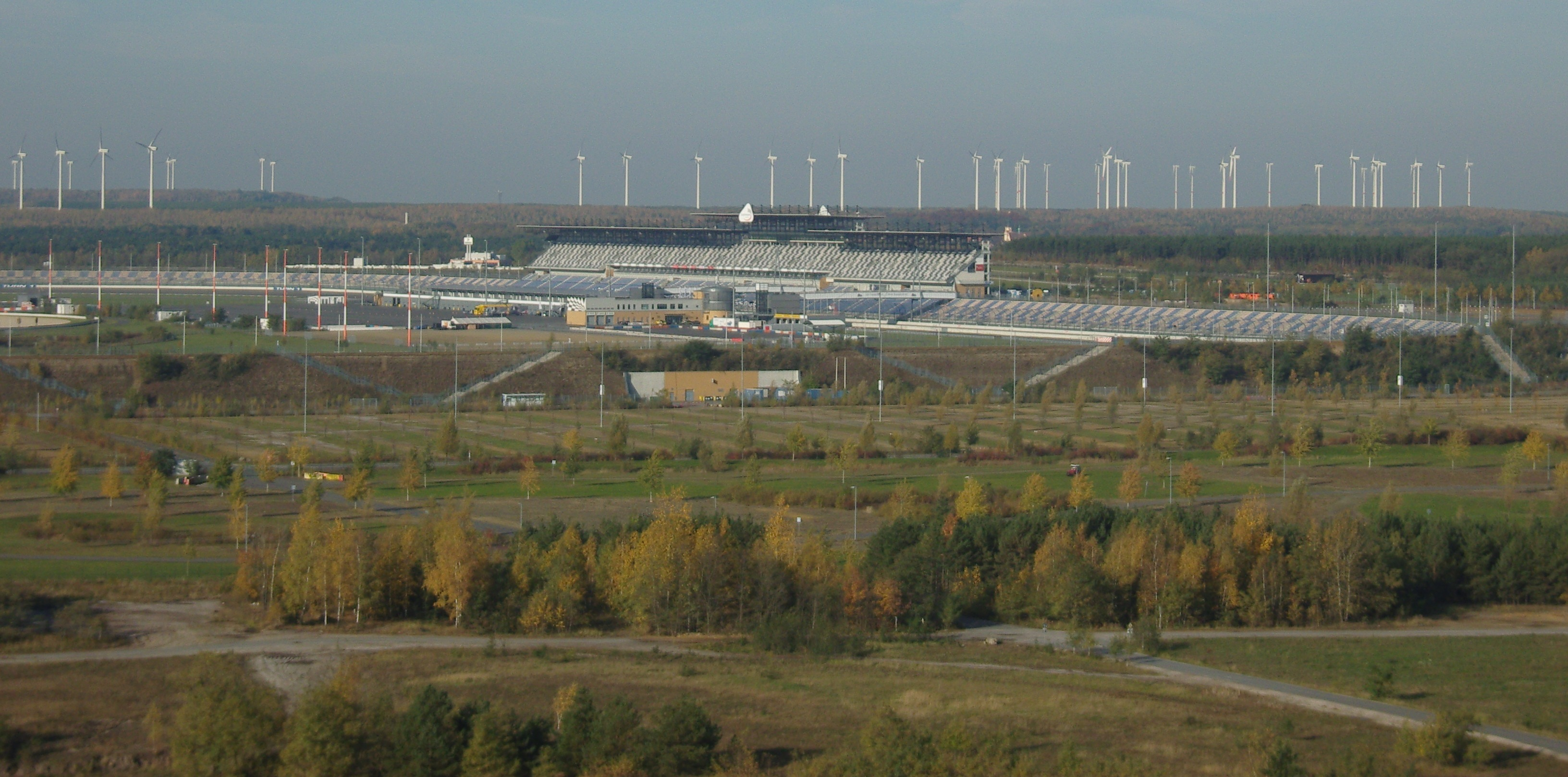
Lausitzring
