= Meuro mine =

Former open-cast mine located in the state of Brandenburg, Germany

Meuro coal mine
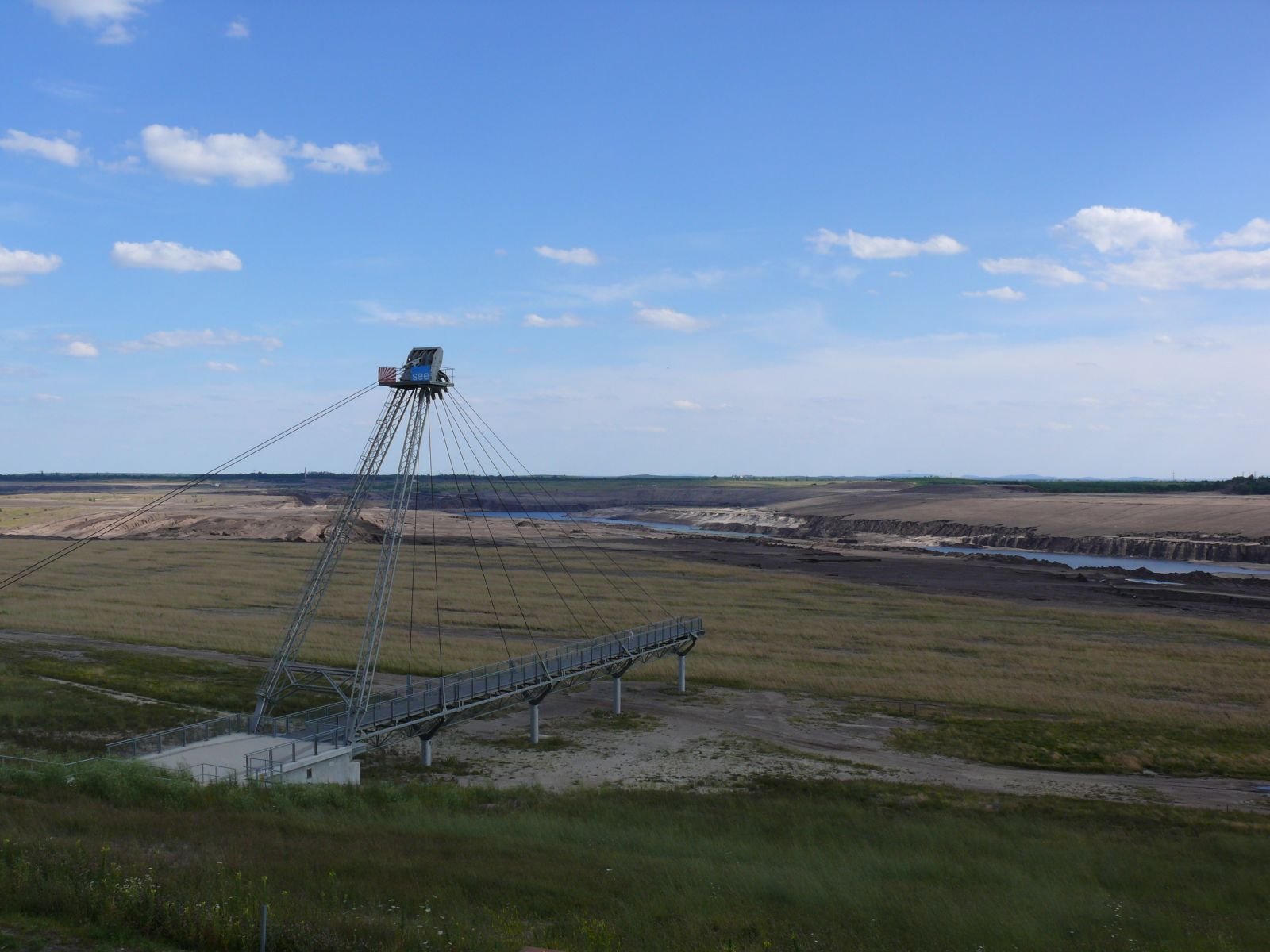
- Interactive map of Meuro coal mine
- Location: Brandenburg, Germany; 51°33′N 13°59′E
- Products: Coal
- Production: 300 Million tons
- Type: Open-pit mining
- Opened: 1958
- Closed: 1999
- Company: LMBV

The Meuro mine was a former open-cast mine located in the state of Brandenburg, Germany that was in operation from 1958 to 1999. It was a source of lignite, often referred to as brown coal, which was used in local factories and power stations. It was one of a number of mines in the Lusatia area which left a massive water debt when the water was pumped out for the operation of the mine. This had to be remediated by the company, Lausitzer und Mitteldeutsche Bergbau-Verwaltungsgesellschaft (LMBV), a state-owned company. The area was flooded and converted into a multi-use recreation and tourism area.

== Geography ==
The opencast mine was located in Niederlausitz in the Niederlausitz lignite district. It was north of the city of Senftenberg and south of Großräschen. On the west it was bounded by Bundesautobahn 13, the Priestewitz – Cottbus railway line on the east, and the Bundesstraße 96 to the north.

== History ==
In 1958, the drainage work began and the exploration work was carried out two years later. The opencast mine consisted of the main field and two sub-fields, Hörlitz and Großräschen. The outcrop was in a northeastern direction. From 1965 to 1970 the opencast mine was in the Hörlitz subfield, from 1970 to 1988 in the main field, and from 1988 to 1999 in the Großräschen subfield.

=== Production ===
The mined lignite was delivered to the surrounding briquette factories Progress, Brieske, Meurostolln, Sonne, Aufstieg and Rosa-Luxemburg as well as to the power plants Brieske, Sonne, Jänschwalde and Schwarze Pump. A total of 300 million tons of raw lignite were mined.

=== Land use ===
The open pit took up an area of 3,583 hectares. 1,840 million cubic meters of overburden were moved.

==== Resettlement ====
The construction of the mine resulted in numerous villages being partially or completely devastated. Sauo, Rauno and Reppist as well as Bückgen, the later district of Großräschen-Süd, were completely excavated. Inhabitants of Sedlitz, Anna-Mathilde, Senftenberg, Hörlitz as well as from the eponymous place Meuro had to be partially resettled.

The resettlement began in 1960 with 400 residents from Hörlitz and 20 from Meuro. Then 760 residents of Sauo were resettled in 1971, 60 residents from Rauno until the demolition in 1983/1984, and 170 residents from Reppist, which was excavated in 1986/1987. In Bückgen, as many as 2,510 inhabitants were resettled by the time it was demolished in 1989/90.

Due to the demolition of the suburbs, parts of Senftenberg's population and 685 residents from Sedlitz were relocated from 1983 to 1987.

== Redevelopment and recreation ==
The Lausitzer und Mitteldeutsche Bergbau-Verwaltungsgesellschaft (LMBV) rehabilitated the area of the former mine, a process which is still ongoing. The tilted embankments were flattened, and former landfills were removed or secured. The former open-cast mine infrastructure was dismantled and some ware preserved. In addition, the mine water was raised and cleaned.

The newly created areas of the post-mining landscape are used for leisure and energy production. The remaining holes were filled with water to create multiple lakes with the biggest being the Großräschener lake, which was filled until 2018. In January 2018 the water level reached 98.5 m above sea level. NHN. The Großräschener lake is connected to the Sedlitzer lake via the Sorno Canal, which arose from the Sedlitz opencast mine.

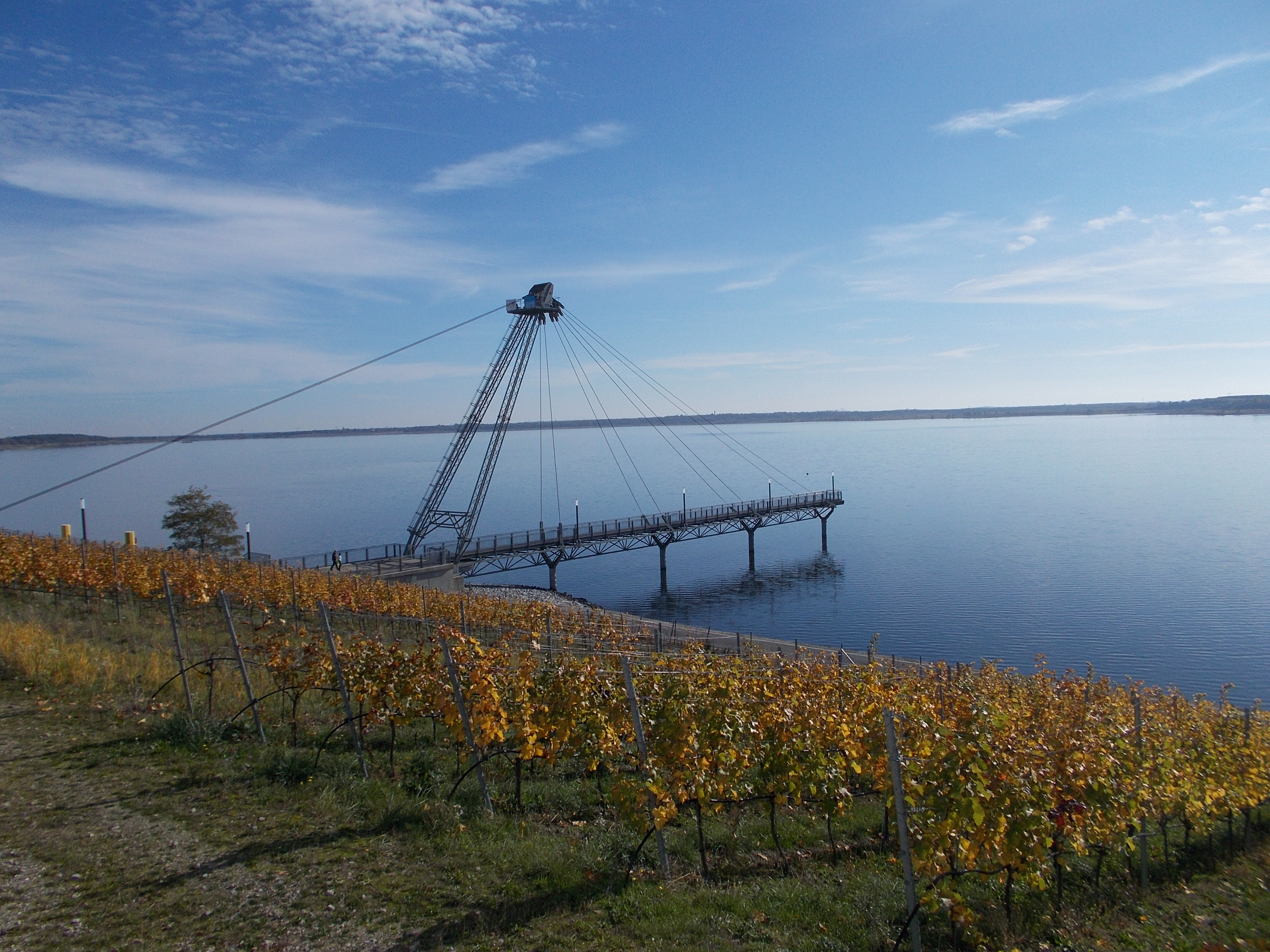
The Großräschen pier in 2019

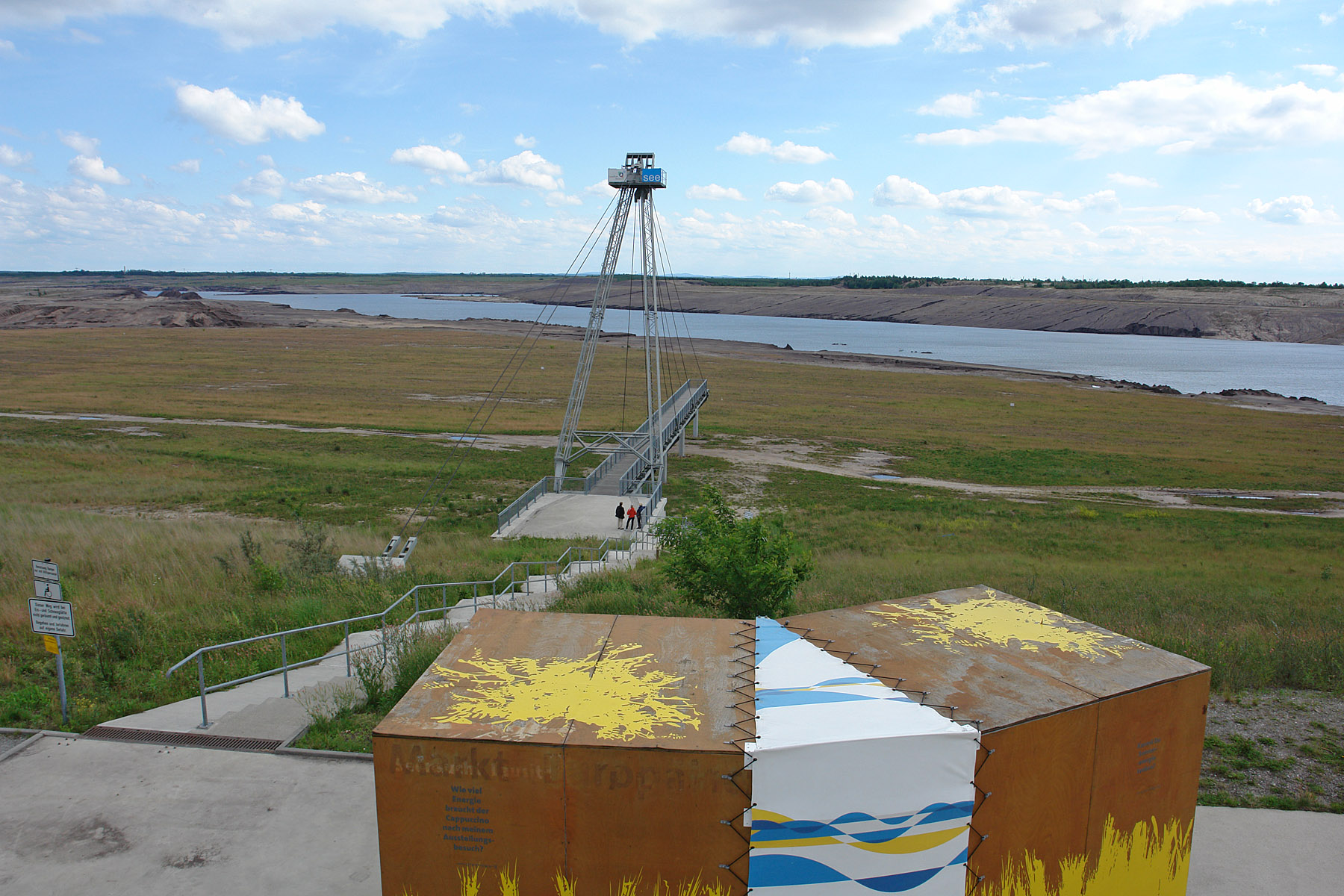
The same pier in 2009

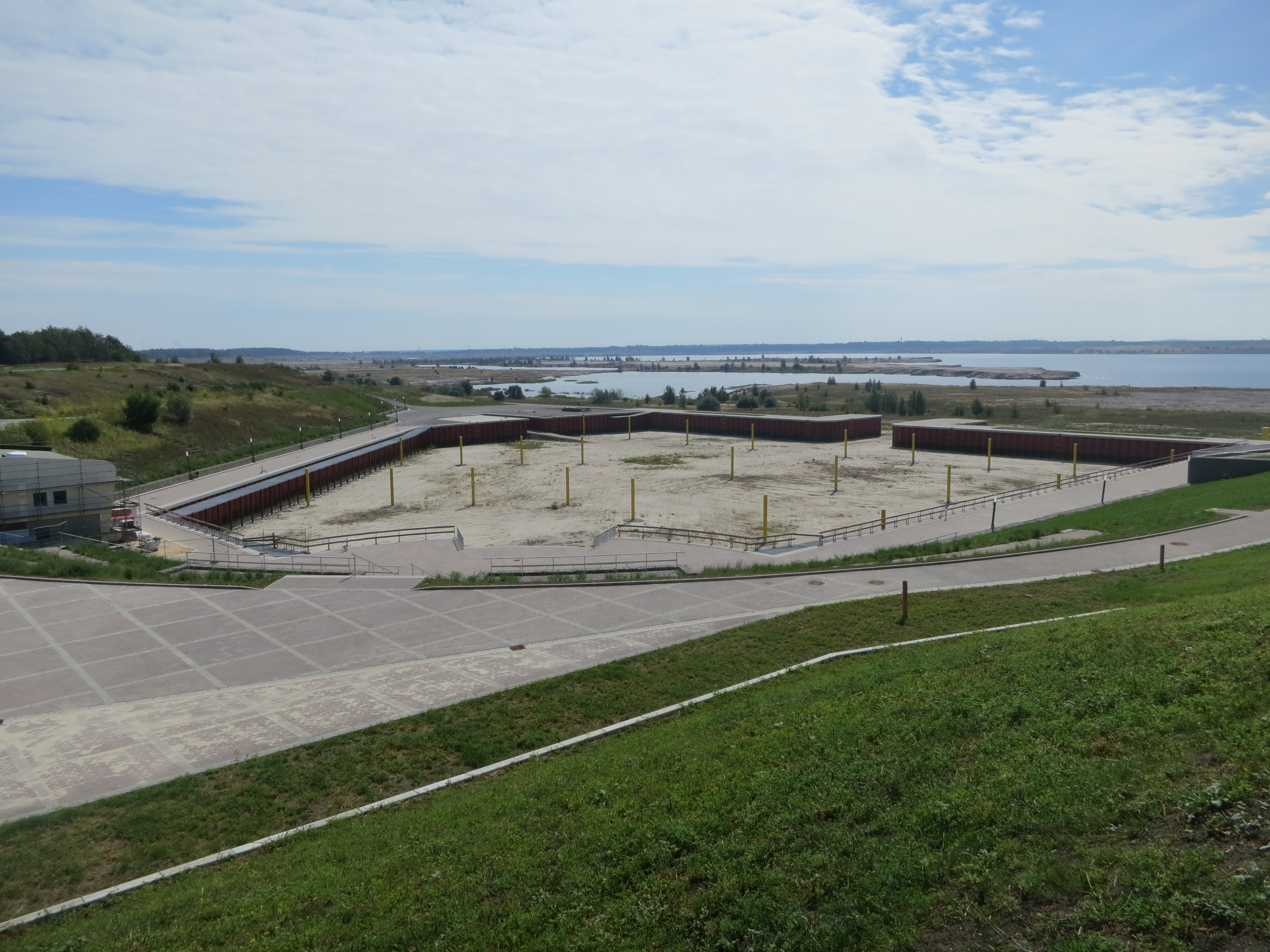
The Großräschen harbor in 2016

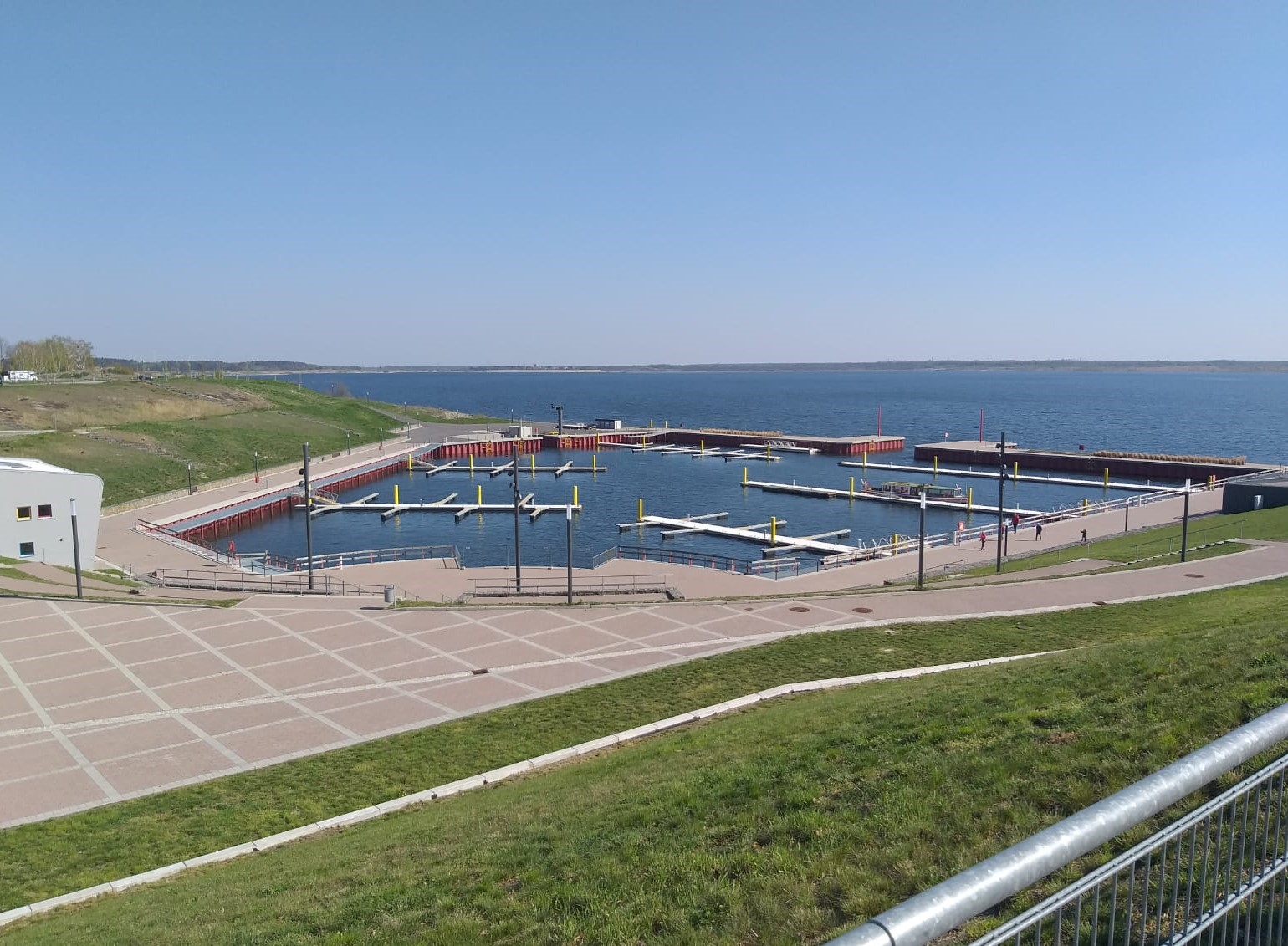
The same harbor in 2019

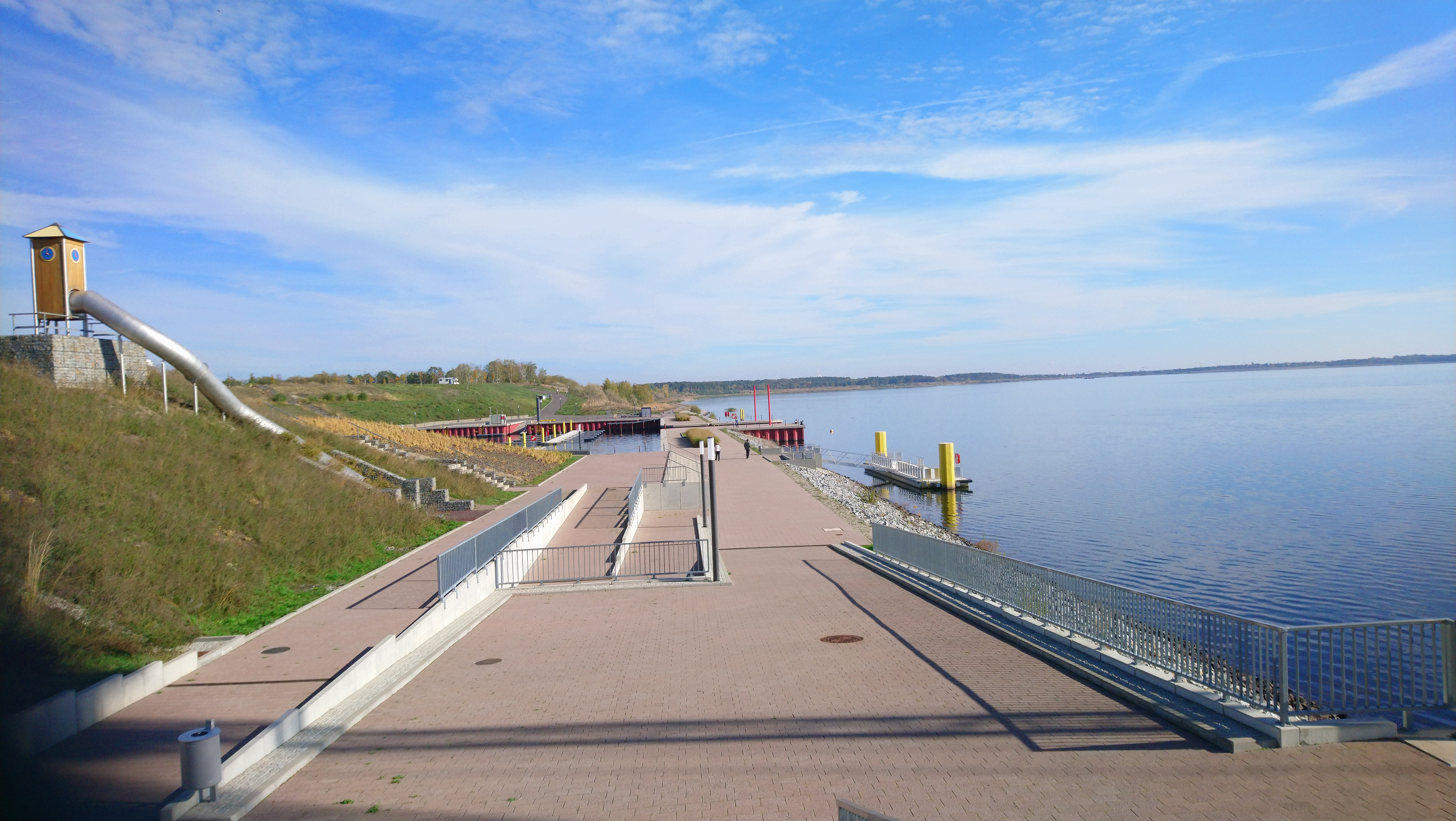
The boardwalk along the water

In 2000 the motor racing track Lausitzring was built on the refilled area of the Hörlitz subfield.

The European Route of Industrial Heritage is presented on the banks of the future lake in Großräschen at the IBA terraces in an exhibition and information center. This is also the station of the European Route of Industrial Heritage. In 2005 the pier, the future landing stage, was built on Großräschener See.

The Bucket Wheel Excavator 1473 has been standing on the southwestern edge of the mine since 2003 (also called the Blue Wonder because of the color). It had been in use almost continuously in the Meuro opencast mine since 1965 and was the only opencast mine that remained on site. At the beginning of 2019, however, it became known that the excavator was to be scrapped.

== Current uses ==
Parts of the mine were flooded to make the Großräschener See.

Further uses include:

- Solarpark Senftenberg/Schipkau
- EuroSpeedway Lausitz

== See also ==
- Overburden Conveyor Bridge F60
- Bagger 1473
