= Schipkau =

- Municipality
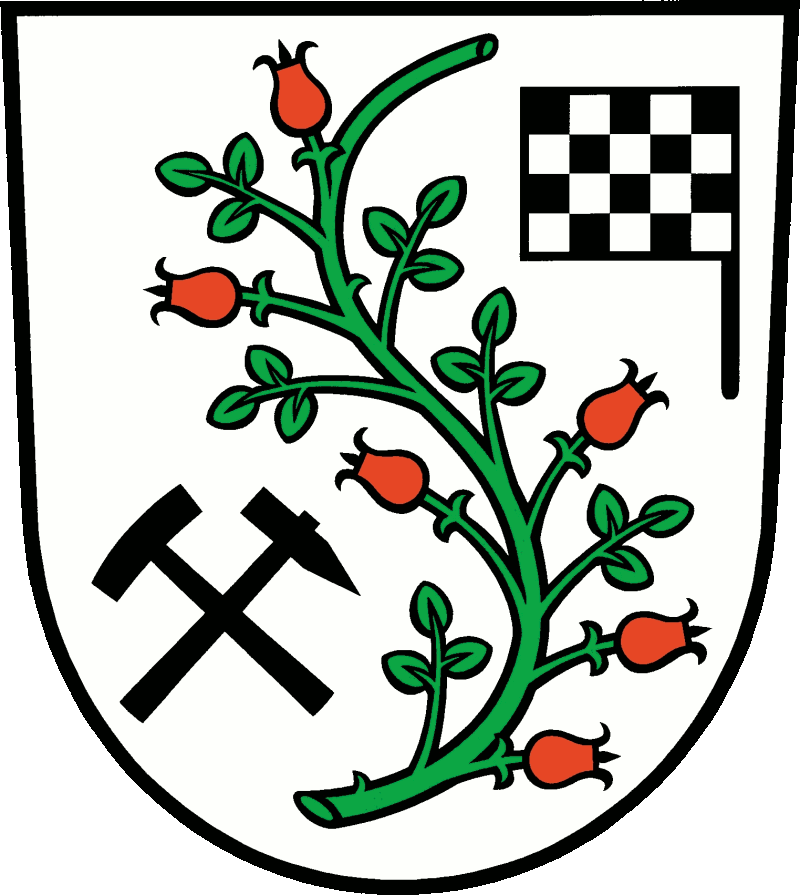
- Coat of arms

- Location of Schipkau within Oberspreewald-Lausitz district
- Interactive map of Schipkau
- Location within Germany Location within Brandenburg
- Coordinates: 51°31′00″N 13°52′59″E
- Country: Germany
- State: Brandenburg
- District: Oberspreewald-Lausitz
- Subdivisions: 6 Ortsteile

Government
  - Mayor (2018–26): Klaus Prietzel (CDU)

Area
  - Total: 72.91 km^{2} (28.15 sq mi)
- Elevation: 109 m (358 ft)

Population (2025-12-31)
  - Total: 6,704
  - Density: 91.95/km^{2} (238.1/sq mi)
- Time zone: UTC+01:00 (CET)
  - Summer (DST): UTC+02:00 (CEST)
- Postal codes: 01993
- Dialling codes: 035754
- Vehicle registration: OSL
- Website: www.gemeinde-schipkau.de

Schipkau (Lower Sorbian: Šejkow, pronounced [ˈʃɛjkɔw]) is a municipality in the Oberspreewald-Lausitz district, in Lower Lusatia, Brandenburg, Germany.

== Geography ==
The municipality is located in the north of the historical region of Lusatia, close to the motorway A13, connecting Berlin with Dresden.

Schipkau counts 5 civil parishes (Ortsteile): Annahütte, Drochow, Hörlitz, Klettwitz and Meuro.

== History ==
From 1815 to 1947, Schipkau was part of the Prussian Province of Brandenburg. From 1952 to 1990, it was part of the Bezirk Cottbus of East Germany. In 2021, the Energiepark Lausitz project of the municipality of Schipkau was realized on the Klettwitz Hochkippe by GP JOULE with the partners Terravent and Steinbock EE. There, the open spaces between the existing wind turbines are used for the construction and operation of photovoltaic systems.

On September 19, 2024 construction work on GICON High-Altitude Wind Turbine in Klettwitz wind park, which belongs to Schipkau, started. It will have a nacelle height of 300 metres and a rotor diametre of 126 metres. When completed, it will not only be the tallest wind turbine in the world, but also the second-tallest man-made object in Germany and one of the tallest structures in the European Union.

== Demography ==
Development of population since 1875 within the current boundaries (blue line: population; dotted line: comparison to population development of Brandenburg state; grey background: time of Nazi rule; red background: time of communist rule)

Recent population development and projections (population development before 2011 census) (blue line); recent population development according to the Census in Germany in 2011 (blue bordered line); official projections for 2005-2030 (yellow line); for 2017-2030 (scarlet line); for 2020-2030 (green line)

Schipkau: Population development
within the current boundaries (2020)

Year	Pop.	±% p.a.
1875	2,807	—
1890	4,569	+3.30%
1910	11,921	+4.91%
1925	12,980	+0.57%
1939	13,218	+0.13%
1950	13,992	+0.52%
1964	11,614	−1.32%

Year	Pop.	±% p.a.
1971	11,017	−0.75%
1981	9,257	−1.73%
1985	8,857	−1.10%
1990	9,807	+2.06%
1995	9,518	−0.60%
2000	8,659	−1.87%
2005	7,605	−2.56%

Year	Pop.	±% p.a.
2010	7,357	−0.66%
2015	6,813	−1.52%
2016	6,764	−0.72%
2017	6,800	+0.53%
2018	6,703	−1.43%
2019	6,661	−0.63%
2020	6,638	−0.35%

== Sport ==
Close to Klettwitz and in north of Schipkau the "EuroSpeedway Lausitz" is located, a race track originally named "Lausitzring".
