= List of former tractor manufacturers =

This is a list of companies that formerly manufactured and / or sold tractors. Some tractor and / or agricultural machinery companies have discontinued manufacturing, or were bought out or merged with other companies, or their company names may have changed.

The production numbers of tractors in the USA amounted to 10,300 from the first vehicles up to 1915. In 1916, 29,670. In 1917, 62,742, and in 1918, 132,697 tractors. In 1919, 164,590. In 1920, 203,207. In 1921, 73,198. In 1922, 99,692. In 1923, 134,590. In 1924, 119,305. In 1925, 167,640. In 1926, 181,995. In 1927, 200,500. In the year 1918, there were 130 different tractor manufacturers in the USA. From 1900 to 1947, 593 tractor manufacturers in the USA exist.

== Overview production figures of tractors in the USA ==
Year	Production	Gas Tractors	International Harvester tractors	Ford gasoline tractors	Gas establishments	Steam Tractors	steam establishments
1849-1884				0		> 3,406; (2,786 Case; 620 Huber)	A.L. Archambault (1849); Hoard and Bradford (1850); Gaar Scott (1852); J.W. Fawkes (1858); Robinson & Co. (1860); Rumely (1863); Case (1876); Oneida Iron Works (1880)
1885				0		> 379; 195 Case; 153 Huber; 31 Port Huron	Case; Huber; Port Huron; Ames Iron Works
1886				0		> 352; 182 Case; 130 Huber; 40 Port Huron	Case; Huber; Port Huron
1887				0		> 473; 236 Case; 195 Huber; 42 Port Huron	Case; Huber; Port Huron; Nichols Shepard & Co.
1888				0		> 601; 280 Case; 252 Huber; 69 Port Huron	Case; Huber; Port Huron
1889		6		0	Charter Gas Engine/ Rumely	> 974; 297 Case; 325 Huber; 62 Port Huron; 290 Geiser	Case; Huber; Port Huron; Geiser
1890		1		0	Taylor	~ 3,000; 456 Case; 402 Huber; 94 Port Huron; 190 Geiser; 255 Taylor; 50 Minneapolis	Case; Huber; Port Huron; Geiser; Aultman-Taylor; Minneapolis; O.S. Kelley; A.D. Baker; Ferdinand Machine Works
1891				0	William Deering/ New Ideal	> 1,725; 462 Case; 396 Huber; 87 Port Huron; 330 Geiser; 340 Taylor; 110 Minneapolis	Case; Huber; Port Huron; Geiser; Aultman-Taylor; Minneapolis; O.S. Kelley; Minnesota
1892		3		0	John Froehlich/ Van Duzen Gas; Case; C.H. Dissinger and Bros.; Patterson	> 1,975; 572 Case; 475 Huber; 97 Port Huron; 306 Geiser; 350 Taylor; 175 Minneapolis	Case; Huber; Port Huron; Geiser; Aultman-Taylor; Minneapolis; O.S. Kelley; Minnesota
1893		2		0	J.A. Hockett; John Froehlich/ Waterloo	> 1,851; 482 Case; 361 Huber; 68 Port Huron; 310 Geiser; 250 Taylor; 380 Minneapolis	Case; Huber; Port Huron; Geiser; Aultman-Taylor; Minneapolis; O.S. Kelley; Minnesota
1894		4		0	Van Duzen (1894-1898 later Huber.); Otto Gas; Lambert Gas; Charter Gas; Best	> 906; 199 Case; 185 Huber; 47 Port Huron; 260 Geiser; 110 Taylor; 105 Minneapolis	Case; Huber; Port Huron; Geiser; Aultman-Taylor; Minneapolis; O.S. Kelley; Minnesota
1895		4 ( Hockett tractor)		0	Waterloo; Davis; Webster; Charter Gas; J.A. Hockett	> 1,108; 127 Case; 339 Huber; 52 Port Huron; 310 Geiser; 120 Taylor; 160 Minneapolis	
1896		~ 25 (6 Otto Gas)		0	van Duzen; Otto; Waterloo; Best	> 1,528; 346 Case; 264 Huber; 108 Port Huron; 335 Geiser; 220 Taylor; 255 Minneapolis	D. June
1897		> 5; (4 Kinnard & Sons )		0	McCormic; Kinnard & Sons	> 1,235; 262 Case; 217 Huber; 141 Port Huron; 335 Geiser; 140 Taylor; 140 Minneapolis	
1898		35		0	Kinnard & Sons; McCormic; Huber	> 1,730; 211 Case; 342 Huber; 252 Port Huron; 450 Geiser; 210 Taylor; 200 Minneapolis; 65 Harrison	
1899		29		0	Kinnard & Sons; S.S. Morton	> 2,794; 920 Case; 412 Huber; 267 Port Huron; 540 Geiser; 260 Taylor; 365 Minneapolis; 30 Harrison	Port Huron
1900				0	( 6 Companies); Lambert Gas	~ 6,100; 1,032 Case; 445 Huber; 342 Port Huron; 550 Geiser; 180 Taylor; 430 Minneapolis; 58 Harrison	(31 companys)
1901	~ 5,100	< 100		0	(2 Companies) Hart Parr	~ 5,000; 962 Case; 550 Huber; 266 Port Huron; 610 Geiser; 190 Taylor; 480 Minneapolis; 58 Harrison	(30 companys)
1902				0	(2 Companies); Hart Parr; Massey-Harris	~ 5,800; 1,574 Case; 478 Huber; 300 Port Huron; 550 Geiser; 230 Taylor; 556 Minneapolis; 64 Harrison	
1903		< 50		0	Hart Parr; Massey-Harris; Lauson; Morton; Foos; Alamo; Stover; St. Maryˋs	~ 6,100; 1,906 Case; 454 Huber; 315 Port Huron; 710 Geiser; 200 Taylor; 450 Minneapolis; 43 Harrison	Port Huron steam tractor
1904		~ 103		0	(6 Companies); Gas Traction Co.; Hart Parr; Dissinger; Electric Wheel	~ 5,200; 1,348 Case; 320 Huber; 310 Port Huron; 850 Geiser; 260 Taylor; 365 Minneapolis; 45 Harrison	
1905	~ 6,350	< 250; (~ 125 Hart Parr)		0	(6 Companies); Gas Traction Company; Hart Parr	~ 6,100; 1,286 Case; 346 Huber; 283 Port Huron; 790 Geiser; 250 Taylor; 410 Minneapolis; 54 Harrison	
1906		~200; (~ 150 Hart Parr; 14 IHC; 25 Flour City)	14	0	(19 Companies); Eagle; Hart Parr	> 4,478; 2,021 Case; 377 Huber; 328 Port Huron; 920 Geiser; 320 Taylor; 475 Minneapolis; 37 Harrison	
1907		~ 450; ( 449 wheeled; 1 tracklaying; 0 garden)	154	0	(20 Companies)	> 3,563; 1,421 Case; 373 Huber; 300 Port Huron; 1,020 Geiser; 250 Taylor; 150 Minneapolis; 49 Harrison	Port Huron
1908		~1,000; (> 155 Holt; 668 IHC; 50 Kinnard Haynes)	668	0	(21 Companies); Chase; Holt; Kinnard-Haynes	> 3,266; 1,645 Case; 225 Huber; 113 Port Huron; 980 Geiser; 90 Taylor; 180 Minneapolis; 33 Harrison	
1909		~2,000	881	0	(27 Companies); Abenaque; Avery; Geiser; Gray; Hart-Parr; Imperial; International Harvester; Kinnard-Haynes; Russell	> 3,271; 1,662 Case; 427 Huber; 212 Port Huron; 600 Geiser; 170 Taylor; 175 Minneapolis; 25 Harrison	
1910		~4,000	2,142	0	(29 Companies); Advance-Rumely	> 3,247; 1,308 Case; 427 Huber; 162 Port Huron; 675 Geiser; 250 Taylor; 400 Minneapolis; 25 Harrison	
1911		~7,000; (~ 1,900 Advance-Rumely; 2,918 IHC; ~1,800 Hart-Parr)	2,918	0	(36 Companies)	> 3,865; 2,321 Case; 364 Huber; 131 Port Huron; 750 Geiser; 165 Taylor; 110 Minneapolis; 24 Harrison	
1912		13,118; (~ 3,000 Advance-Rumely; 3,831 IHC; ~2,000 Hart-Parr)	3,831	0	(47 Companies); Allis-Chalmers Case	> 3,713; 2,251 Case; 199 Huber; 147 Port Huron; 850 Geiser; 150 Taylor; 90 Minneapolis; 26 Harrison	
1913		8,220; (~ 400-500 Bull Co.; 1,930 IHC)	1,930	1	(56 Companies); Waterloo	> 2,917; 1,916 Case; 284 Huber; 175 Port Huron; 40 Geiser; 170 Taylor; 300 Minneapolis; 32 Harrison	
1914		17,651; (~ 3,000 Bull Co.; 1,095 IHC; ~100 Moline)	1,095	0	(58 Companies)	> 3,046; 1,379 Case; 221 Huber; 199 Port Huron; 700 Geiser; 280 Taylor; 230 Minneapolis; 37 Harrison	
1915	24,030	24,030; (~ 4,000 Bull Co.; 5,842 IHC)	5,841	0	(73 Companies)	> 2,581; 952 Case; 290 Huber; 278 Port Huron; 540 Geiser; 195 Taylor; 295 Minneapolis; 31 Harrison	
1916	32,036	29,670	11,571	0	(114 Companies); Fageol; Moline	> 1,883; 774 Case; 197 Huber; 200 Port Huron; 360 Geiser; 50 Taylor; 300 Minneapolis; 2 Harrison	Port Huron
1917	67,239	62,742	16,101	254	(124 Companies); Albaugh-Dover	> 1,165; 598 Case; 76 Huber; 130 Port Huron; 120 Geiser; 40 Taylor; 180 Minneapolis; 21 Harrison	
1918	161,004	132,697	25,269	34,167	Acason Bethlehem ;128	> 211; 4 Case; 37 Huber; 55 Port Huron; 40 Geiser; 60 Taylor; 0 Minneapolis; 15 Harrison	Advance-Rumely; Aultman & Taylor; Avery; Baker, A.D.; Buffalo-Pitts; Case Threshing Machine Company; Swayne,Robinson & Co.; Frick; Farquhar, A. B.; Emerson-Brantingham; Heilman Machine Works; Keck-Gonnerman; Leader Tractor Manufacturing Co.; Port Huron; Russell & Co.; Minneapolis Threshing Machine Company; Napoleon Manufacturing Co.; Huber Manufacturing Co.; Harrison Machine Works; Nichols & Shepard; Scheidler Machine Works; Westinghouse; Cascaden Manufacturing; Wood Brothers
1919	172,667	164,590	26,933	57,290		> 961; 346 Case; 96 Huber; 167 Port Huron; 160 Geiser; 50 Taylor; 140 Minneapolis; 2 Harrison	
1920	204,973	203,207	28,419	70,955	(90 Companies); Worthington	1,766; 434 Case; 155 Huber; 160 Port Huron; 20 Geiser; 40 Taylor; 150 Minneapolis; 0 Harrison; (other 807)	15
1921	74,366	73,198; ( 68,029 wheeled); 5,169 garden	17,762	36,761	94	1,168; 100 Case; 53 Huber; 0 Port Huron; 150 Geiser; 25 Taylor; 45 Minneapolis; 1 Harrison; (other 794)	18
1922	100,088	99,692; (94,607 wheeled; 4,187 tracklaying; 898 garden)	11,781	68,985	81	396; 154 Case; 48 Huber; 0 Port Huron; 130 Geiser; 0 Taylor; 55 Minneapolis; 4 Harrison; (other 5)	14
1923		134,590; (~ 131,900 wheeled)	12,026	101,898		> 302; 198 Case; 33 Huber; 0 Port Huron; 10 Geiser; 0 Taylor; 50 Minneapolis; 11 Harrison	
1924	120,823	119,305; (112,188 wheeled; 4,612 tracklaying; 2,505 garden)	18,749	83,010	47	(1,518 ?); 130 Case; 17 Huber; 0 Port Huron; 20 Geiser; 0 Taylor; 25 Minneapolis; 4 Harrison	14
1925	167,650	167,553; (158,037 wheeled; 6,060 tracklaying; 3,456 garden)	32,588	104,168	53	97; 1 Case; 4 Huber; 0 Port Huron; 0 Geiser; 0 Taylor; 0 Minneapolis; 10 Harrison; (other 82)	7
1926	181,995	181,995; (170,302 wheeled; 7,772 tracklaying; 3,921 garden)	50,900	99,101	29+5+13	~ 7; 4 Harrison; 2 Huber; 1 Case	Harrison; Huber; Case
1927	200,504	200,504; (184,594 wheeled; 10,319 tracklaying; 5,591 garden)	55,727	~50,000 (No. 700,000 reached in 1928)	26+6+17	~ 17; 15 Harrison; 2 Huber	Harrison; Huber
1928	175,934	175,934; (152,266 wheeled; 19,203 tracklaying; 4,465 garden)	94,148		33+9+15	~ 4; 4 Harrison	Harrison
1929	228,976	228,976; (195,980 wheeled; 27,101 tracklaying; 5,895 garden)	108,728		28+11+15	~ 5; 5 Harrison	Harrison
1930	202,460	202,458; (176,075 wheeled; 20,222 tracklaying; 6,161 garden)	99,854		25+11+13	~ 2; 2 Harrison	Harrison
1931	71,707	71,704; (61,940 wheeled; 7,089 tracklaying; 2,675 garden)	31,754		First Diesel Tractor by Caterpillar (Diesel 65) 26+8+11	~ 3; 3 Harrison	Harrison
1932	no data collected	~19,000			24+x+x	0	0
1933	no data collected	~34,200			18+x+x	0	0
1934	no data collected	~47,900			18+x+x	0	0
1935	161,131	161,131; (138,084 wheeled; 18,774 tracklaying; 4,273 garden)			(17+x+16 Companies); Allis-Chalmers	0	0
1936	227,185	227,185; (193,947 wheeled; 27,299 tracklaying; 5,939 garden)			18+x+13	0	0
1937	283,155	283,155; (237,837 wheeled; 34,602 tracklaying; 10,716 garden)			19+x+13	0	0
1938	199,223	199,223; (172,437 wheeled; 16,837 tracklaying; 9,949 garden)			42	0	0
1939	218,462	218,462; (188,558 wheeled; 20,127 tracklaying; 9,777 garden)				0	0
1940	283,546	283,546; (249,434 wheeled; 24,762 tracklaying; 9,350 garden)			x+x+14	0	0
1941	358,520	358,520; (313,432 wheeled; 28,661 tracklaying; 16,427 garden)				0	0
1942	212,895	212,895; (171,953 wheeled; 29,555 tracklaying; 11,387 garden)				0	0
1943	143,489	143,489; (105,248 wheeled; 29,453 tracklaying; 8,788 garden)			43	0	0
1944	310,990	310,990; (249,131 wheeled; 44,860 tracklaying; 16,999 garden)			Allis-Chalmers; Case; Cletrac; Holt; International Harvester; McCormick	0	0
1945	261,227	261,227; (222,966 wheeled; 11,502 tracklaying; 26,759 garden)			35+6+20	0	0
1946	364,725	364,725; (243,271 wheeled; 8,898 tracklaying; 112,556 garden)			45	0	0
1947	578,048	578,048; (405,654 wheeled; 12,619 tracklaying; 160,775 garden)			57	0	0
1948	678,141	678,141; (510,321 wheeled; 14,153 tracklaying; 153,667 garden)			85	0	0
1949	687,102	687,102; (538,651 wheeled; 20,043 tracklaying; 128,408 garden)			131	0	0

Market Share of Leading Wheel Tractor Manufacturers by Decade (Table 1.)

== A ==
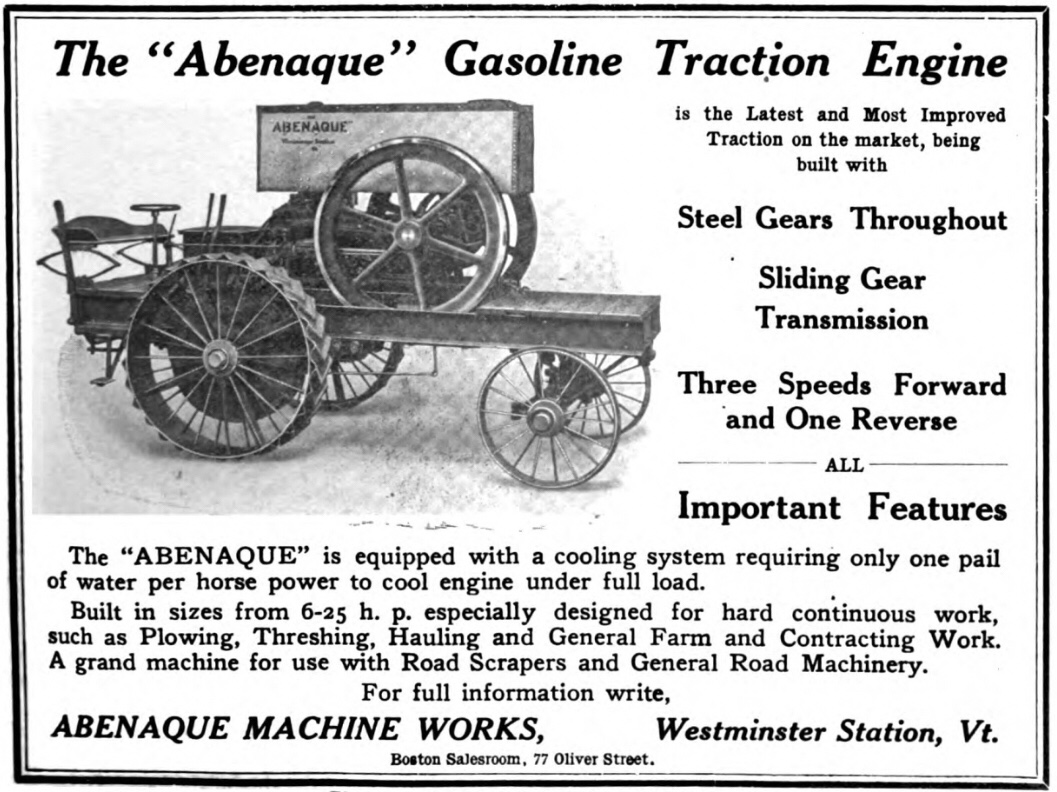
Abenaque advertisement (1909)

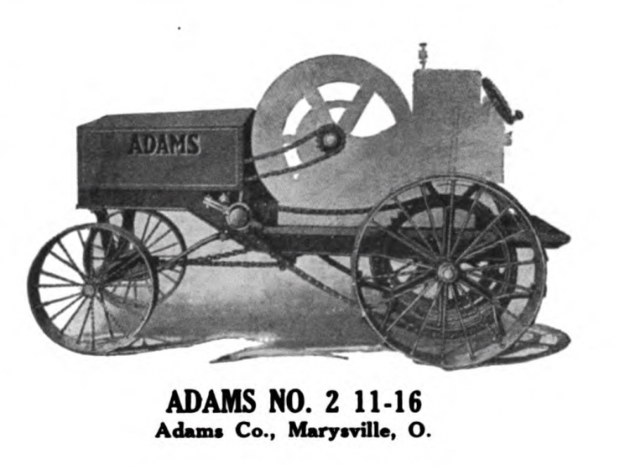
Adams No. 2

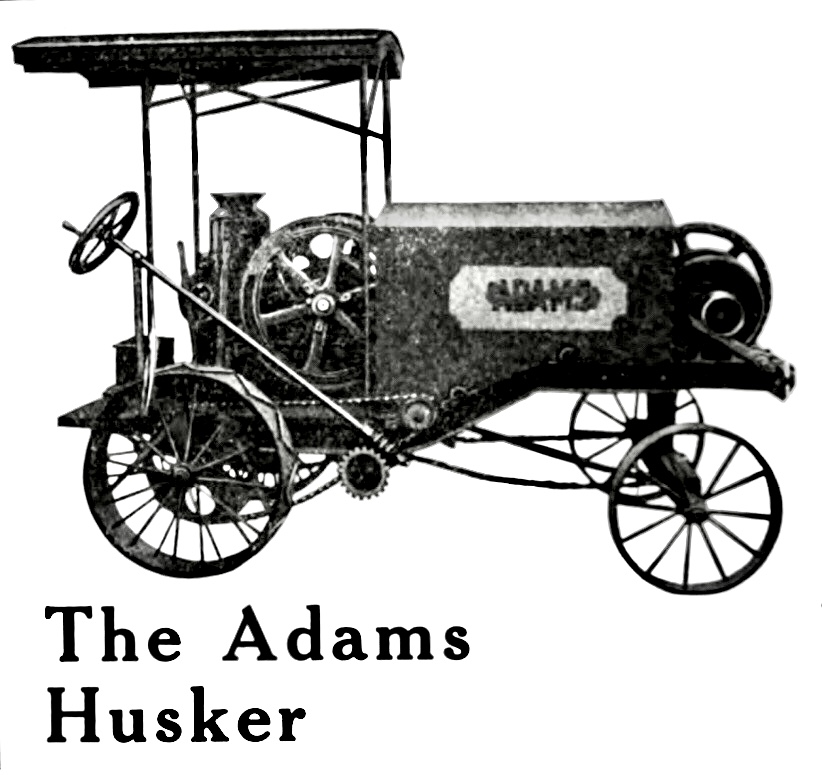
Adams Husker (1911-1915)

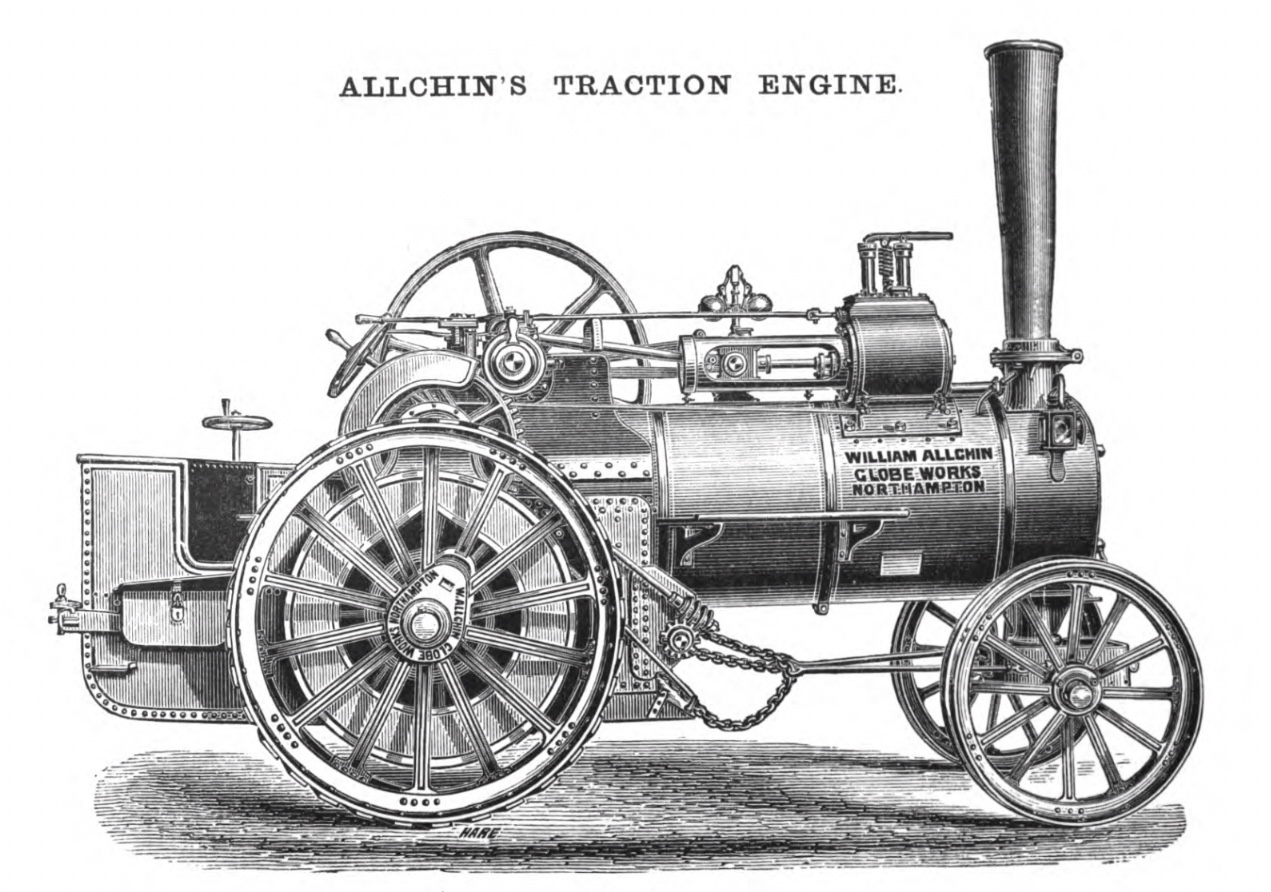
Allchin steam tractor (1890)

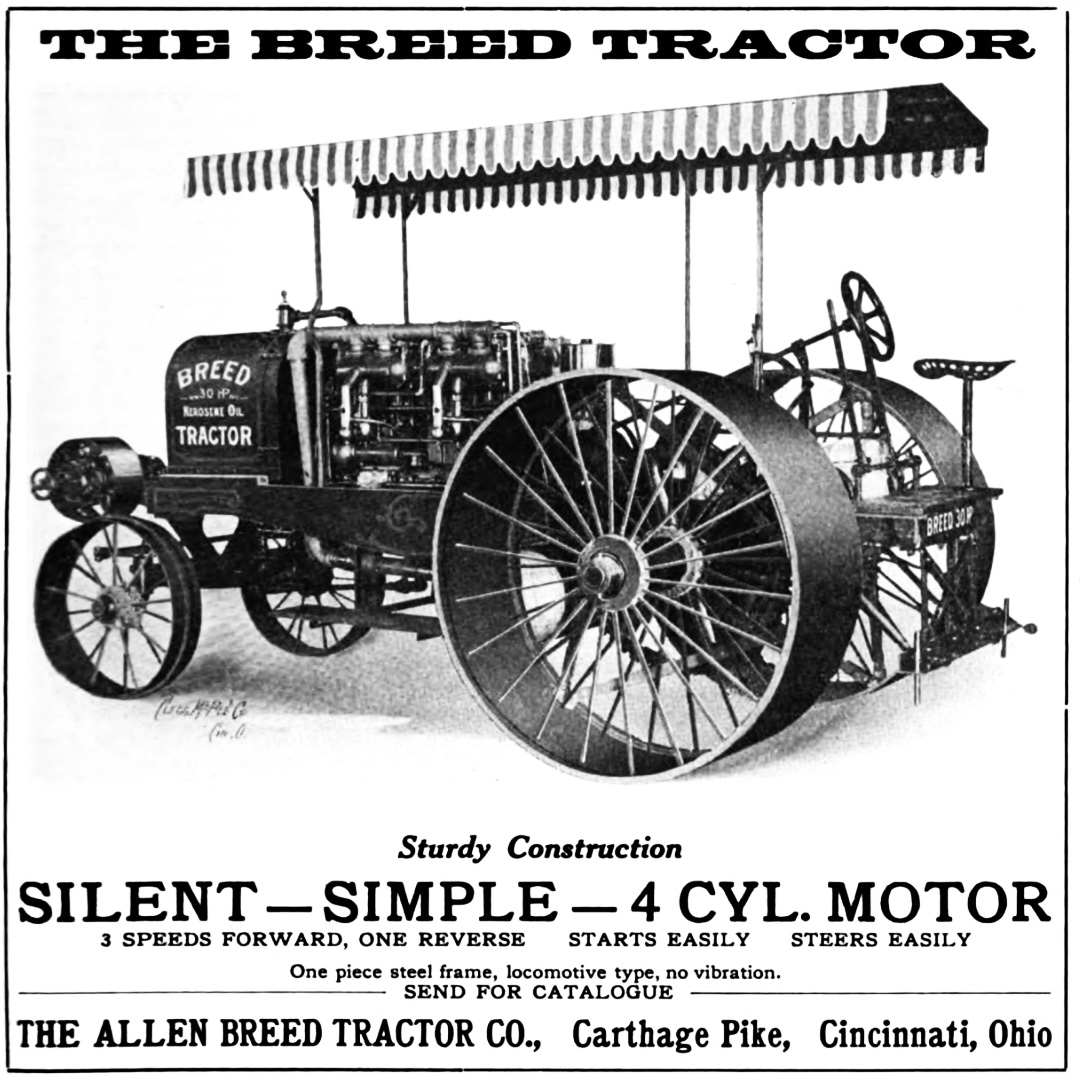
Allen Breed (1914)

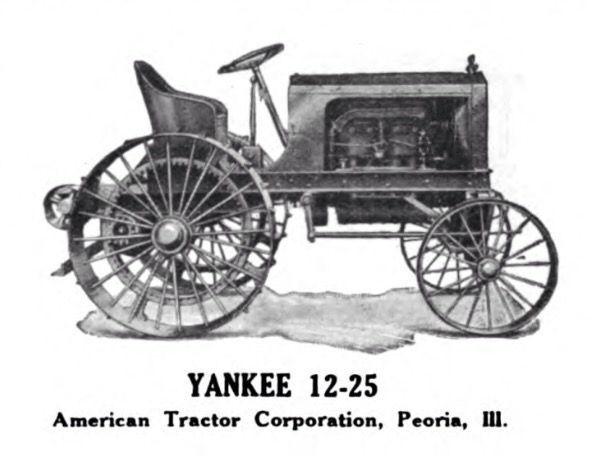
American Tractor Yankee 12-25

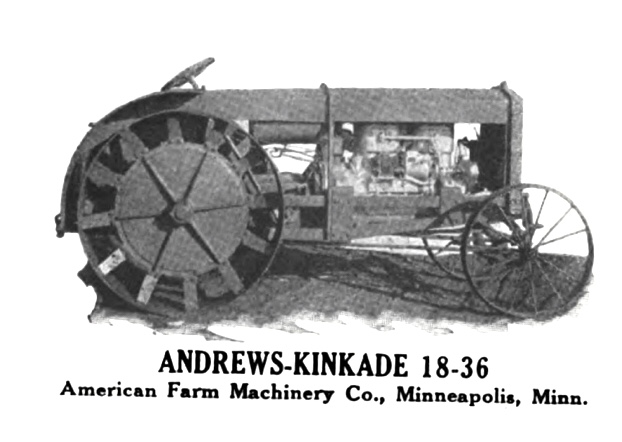
Andrews-Kinkade 18-36

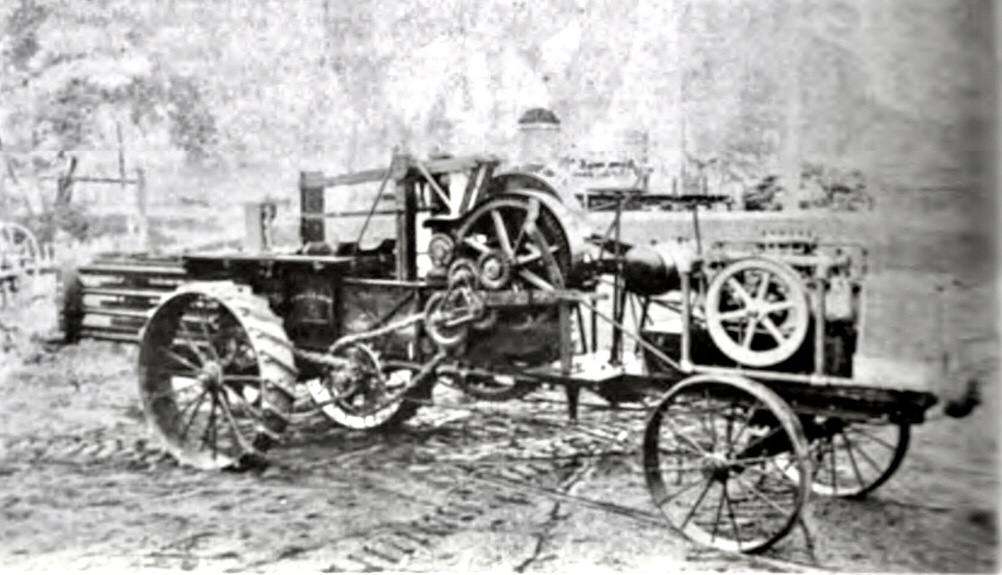
Ann Arbor Hay Press (1910)

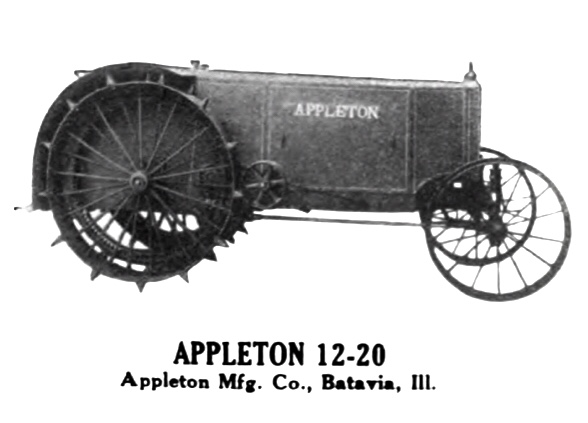
Appleton 12-20

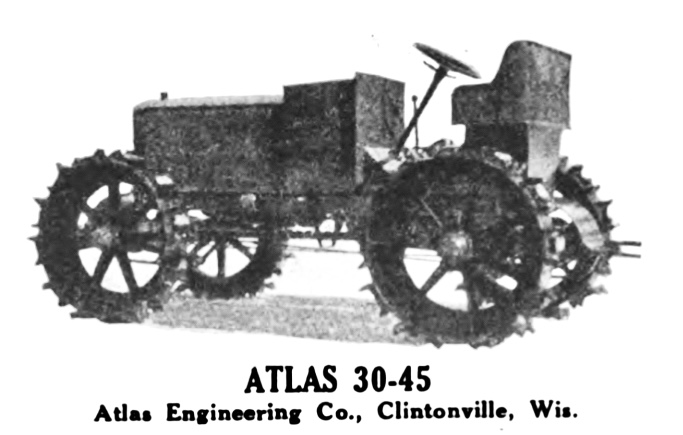
Atlas 30-45 (1927-1930)

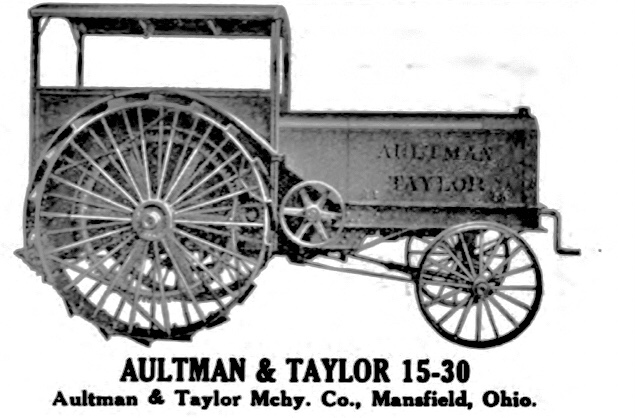
Aultman & Taylor 15-30

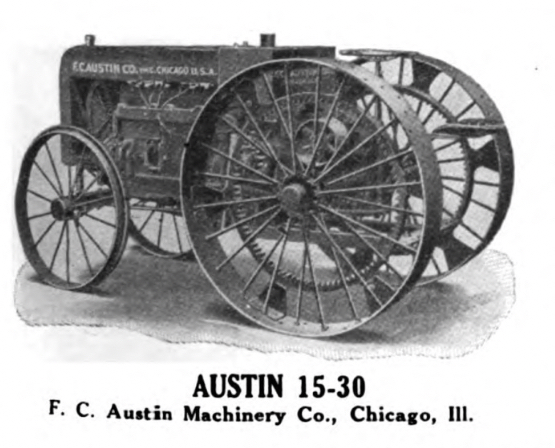
Austin 15-30

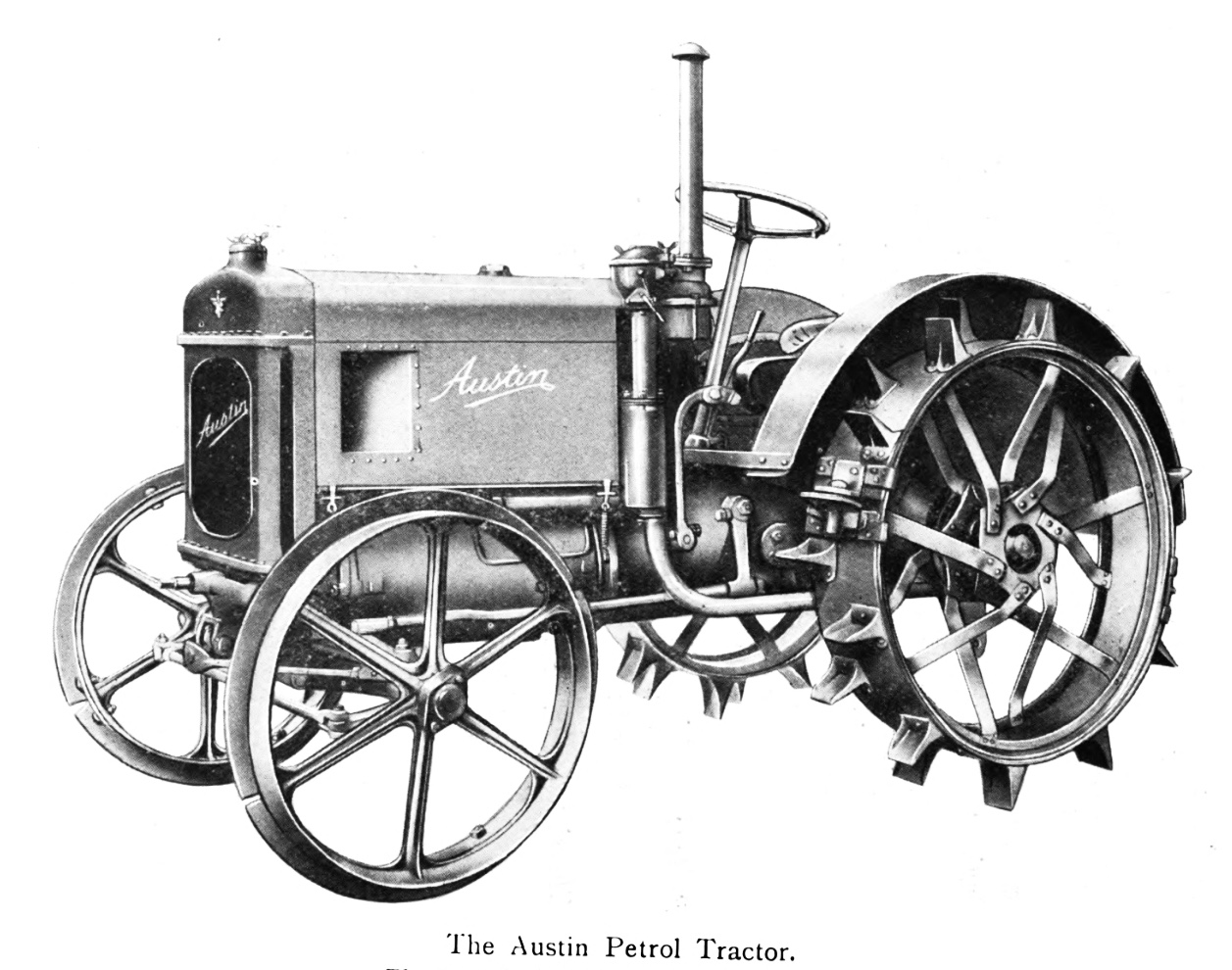
Austin 12-20 Petrol 11-15 Paraffin (1919-1926 GB) (1919-1934 F)

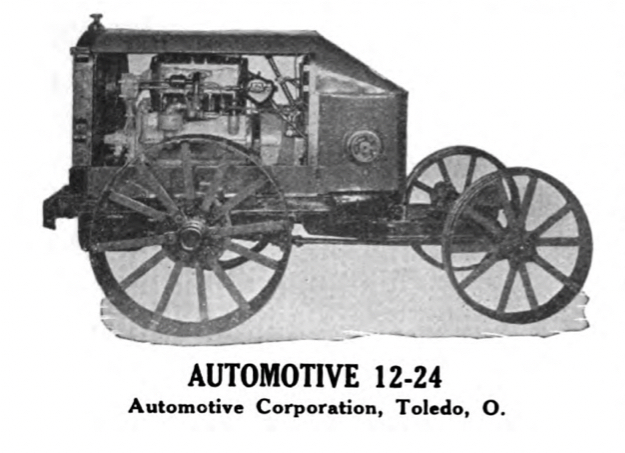
Automotive 12-24

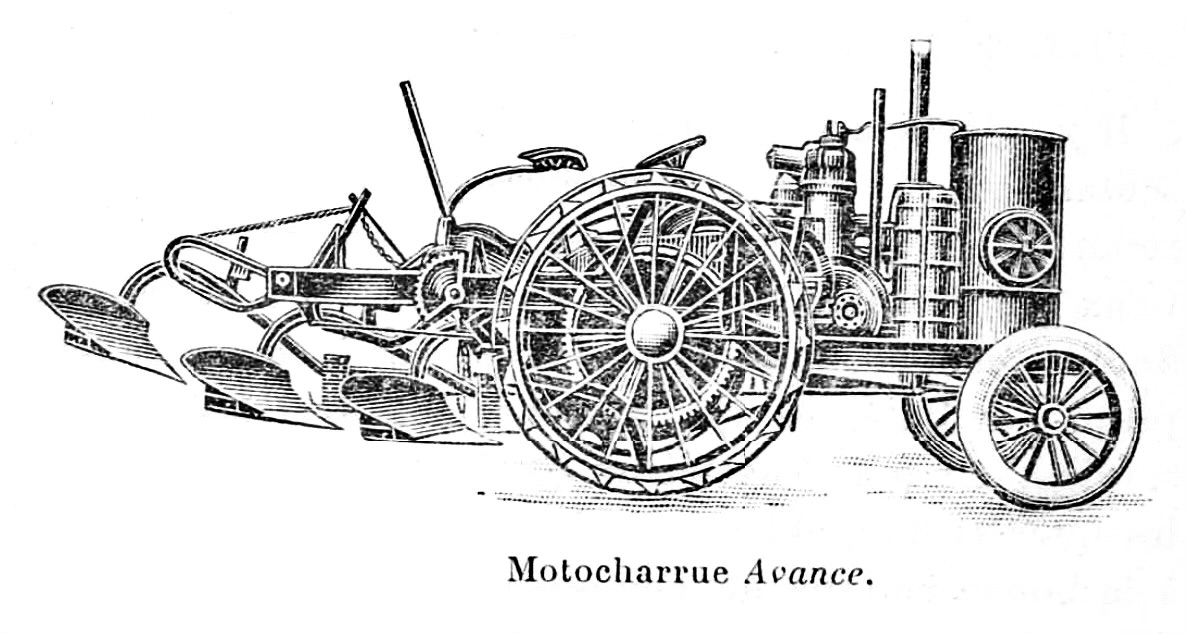
Avance Motorplog Tp.1 (1912-1921)Displacement 6911 cc, bore 200 mm, stroke 220 mm single cylinder. Country of manufacture Sweden

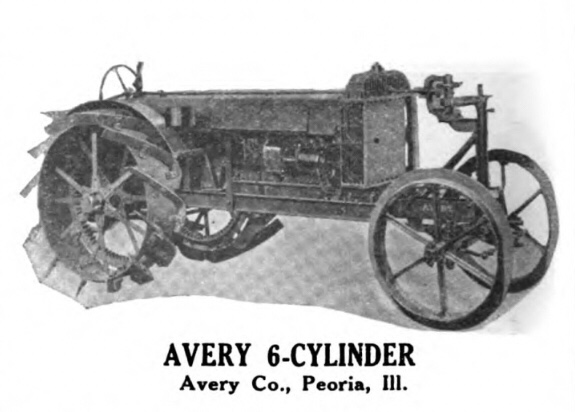
Avery 6 cylinder

- Aaron David Co. (Denmark)
- Abega (Germany)
- Abeille (France)
- Abenaque (USA) Abenaque
- Acam (Denmark)
- Acason (USA)
- Accord (Greece)
- ACME (USA)
- Acme Road Machinery Company (USA)
- ACO (South Africa)
- Acremaster (Australia)
- Adams-Farnham (USA)
- Adams Husker (USA)
- Adams Sidehill (USA)
- ADN (France)
- Adriatica (Italy)
- Advance (USA) – purchased by Rumely
- Advance-Rumely (USA) – purchased by Allis-Chalmers
- Aecherli (Switzerland)
- Aerocentre (France)
- AF France (France)
- AGCO (USA) – discontinued
- AGCO-Allis (USA) – renamed AGCO and discontinued; still built in Argentina
- Agcostar (USA) – part of AGCO Corporation formed from McConnell
- Agricultural & General Engineers (AGE) (England, UK)
- Ager (Italy)
- Agil (Austria)
- Agra Farmer (Canada)
- Agracat (USA) – imported
- Agrale-Deutz (Brazil) – just Agrale now
- Agria GmbH (Germany) Agria-Werke
- Agrifull (Italy) – purchased by Fiat Agrifull
- Agrimeca (Argentina)
- Agrimotor (USA)
- Agrip (France)
- Agri-Power (USA)
- AGRISA-Bungartz (Brazil) – became Agrale
- Agritec (Argentina)
- Agromed (Turkey)
- Agromet (Poland) Agromet
- A.H. McDonald & Co. (Australia)
- Ahlborn
- Aion (Australia)
- Ajax (USA)
- Aktivist (Germany) Aktivist
- Alamo (USA)
- Albaugh-Dover Square Turn (USA)
- Albert Lea (USA)
- Albion-Cuthbertson – James A. Cuthbertson (Scotland, UK)
- Alena (USA) Alena
- ALFA (Spain)
- Alfa Romeo (Italy)
- Allaeys
- Alldays & Onions (England, UK)
- Allchin (England, UK)
- Allen (USA)
- Allen Breed (USA)
- Allgaier (Germany) Allgaier
- Alliance
- Allied (USA)
- Allis-Chalmers (USA) – purchased by AGCO Corporation
- Allmand (USA)
- Almacoa (France)
- Allwork (USA)
- Alpenland (Germany) Alpenland
- Alpina (Switzerland)
- Alpina-Oekonom (Switzerland)
- ALMA (France)
- Altmann (Germany)
- Alu-Trac
- Amadou Josset (France)
- Amanco, Beauvais, Robin (France)
- Amepic
- American (USA)
- American (American Tractor Corporation) (USA) – purchased by J.I. Case
- American-Abell (Canada) steam tractor
- American Engine (USA) steam tractor
- American Harvestor (USA)
- American Machine and Foundry (USA)
- American Steel (USA)
- American Tractor (USA)
- American Well (USA)
- Amiot (France)
- Amog (Italy)
- Anderson (USA)
- Andrews (USA)
- Andrews-Kinkade (USA)
- Anfibio (Brazil)
- Anglo-Thai New Holland (Thailand)
- Ann Arbor Hay Press Company (USA)
- Ansaldo-Fossati (Italy)
- Antigo (USA)
- Anton Schlüter München (Germany)
- Apache (Argentina) – now Apache-Solis
- Appleton (USA)
- Arator
- Argo (Italy)
- Ariens (USA)
- Armington, A.P. (USA)
- Armstrong Siddeley (England, UK)
- Arnold-Sandberg (USA)
- ASHTZ (Russia)
- Assembled
- Asso
- Astoa (Spain)
- Aston Martin (England, UK)
- Atlas Engine (USA) steam tractor
- Aulendorf (Germany)
- Aulson (USA)
- Aultman Engine & Thresher (USA) steam tractor
- Aultman & Taylor (USA) Aultman & Taylor
- Auror (France)
- Austin (USA)
- Austin (France / England, UK)
- Austin-Leyland (Turkey) (BMC Sanayi)
- Austrak (Australia)
- Australian Motor Industries (Australia) licensed production of tractors of the Ferguson and Massey-Ferguson brand
- Austro (Austria)
- Austro-Pimus (Austria)
- Auto Tractor (USA)
- Automotive (USA) Automotive
- Auto-Tiller (USA)
- AutoTrac (Canada)
- Avance (Sweden) – merged into Munktell
- Aveling – Marshall (England, UK)
- Aveling & Porter (England, UK)
- Aveling-Barford (England, UK)
- Avery (USA) – purchased by Minneapolis-Moline
- Avia (Spain)
- Astoa (Spain)
- Agria (Spain)
- Agrimont Group
- Tractors.ae

== B ==
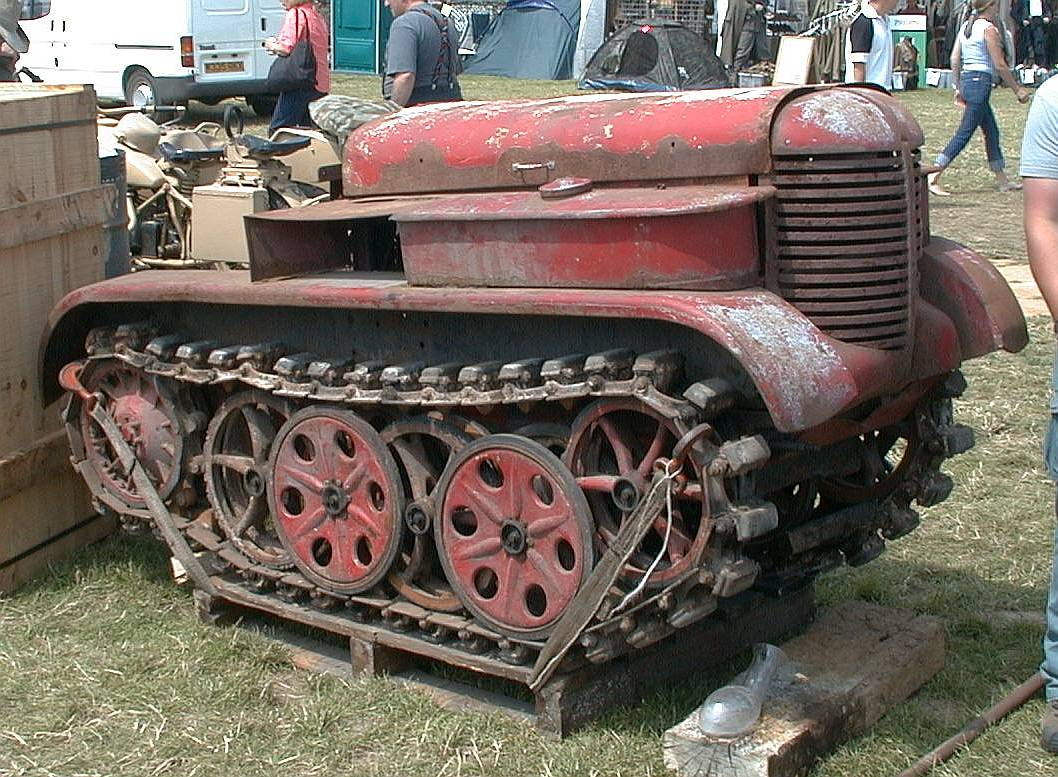
Babiole

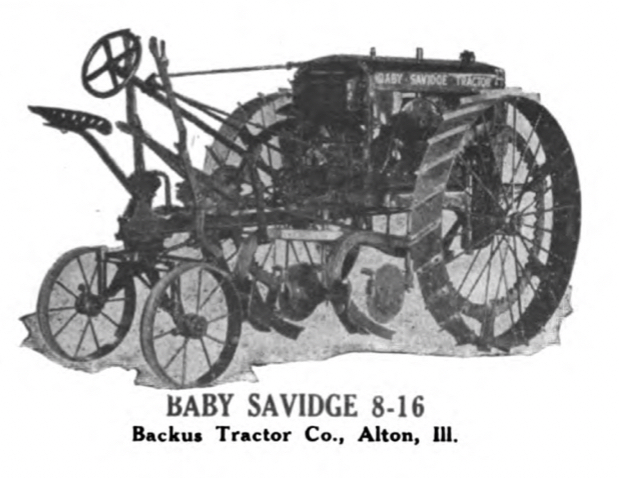
Backus Baby Savidge 8-16

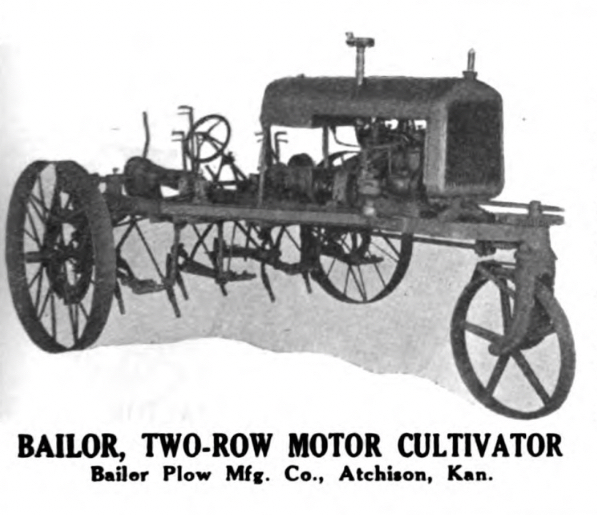
Bailor Two-Row

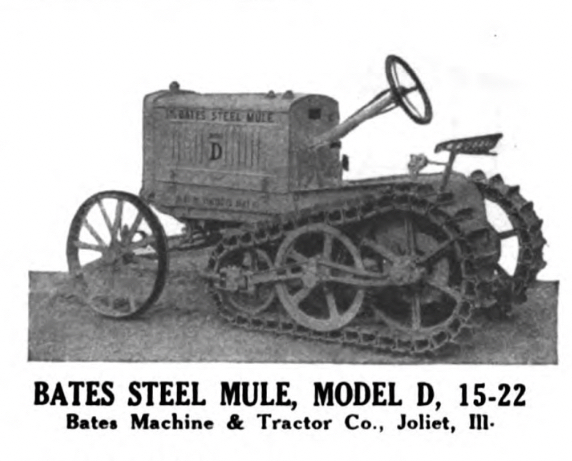
Bates Steel Mule Model D 15-22

Bates tractor (1919)

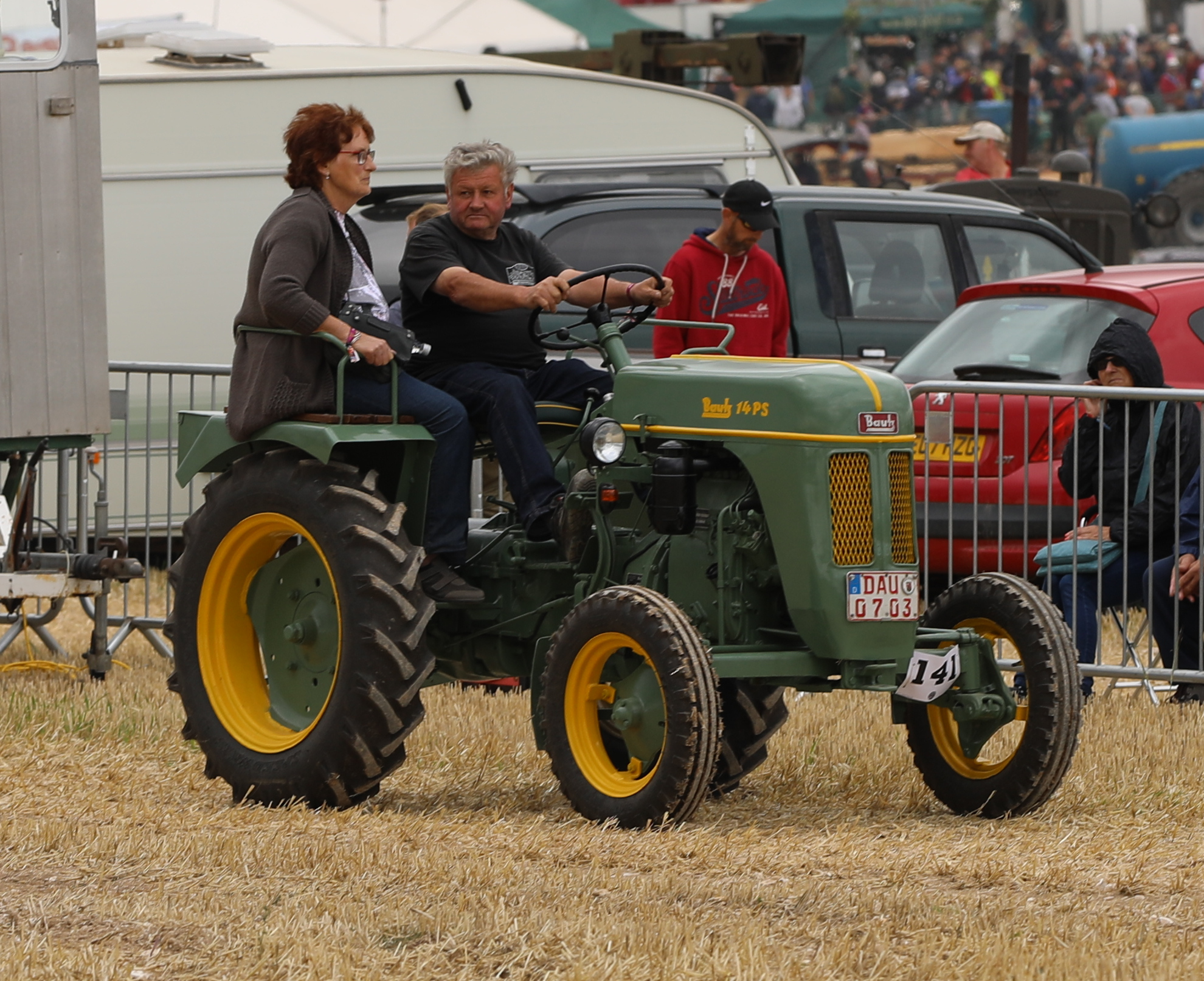
A German Bautz AS120 tractor

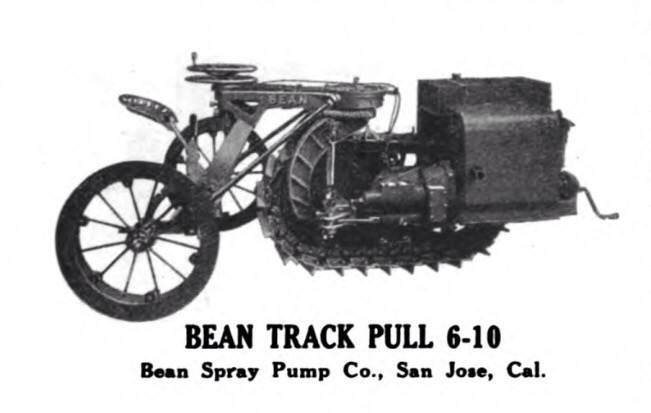
Bean Track Pull 6-10

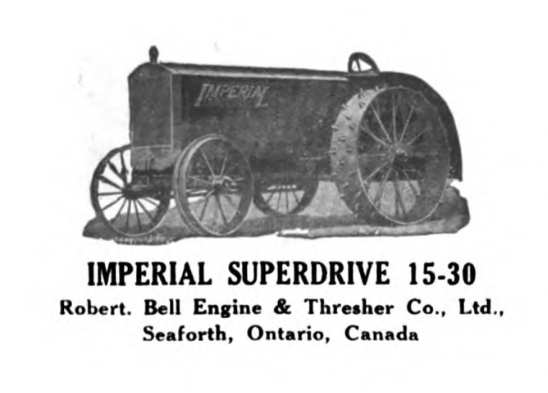
Robert Bell Engine & Thresher imperial superdrive 15-30

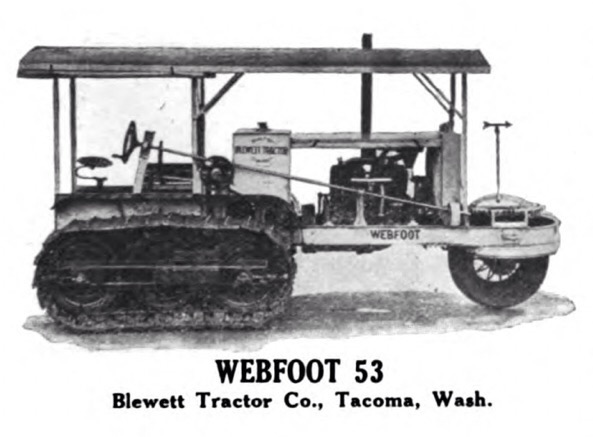
Blewett Webfoot 53

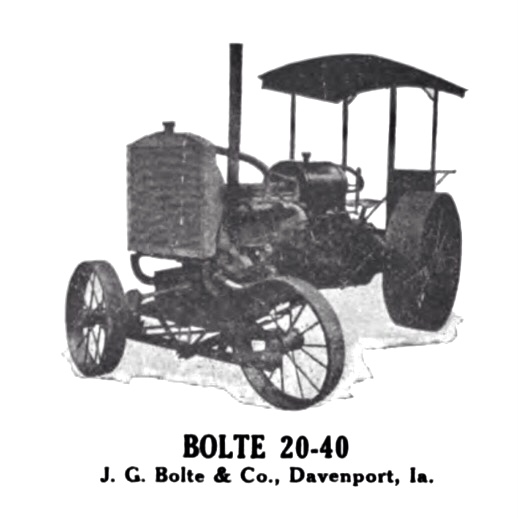
Bolte 20-40

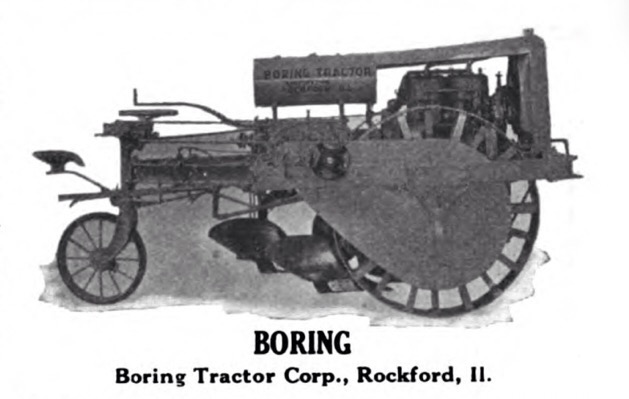
Boring (1920)

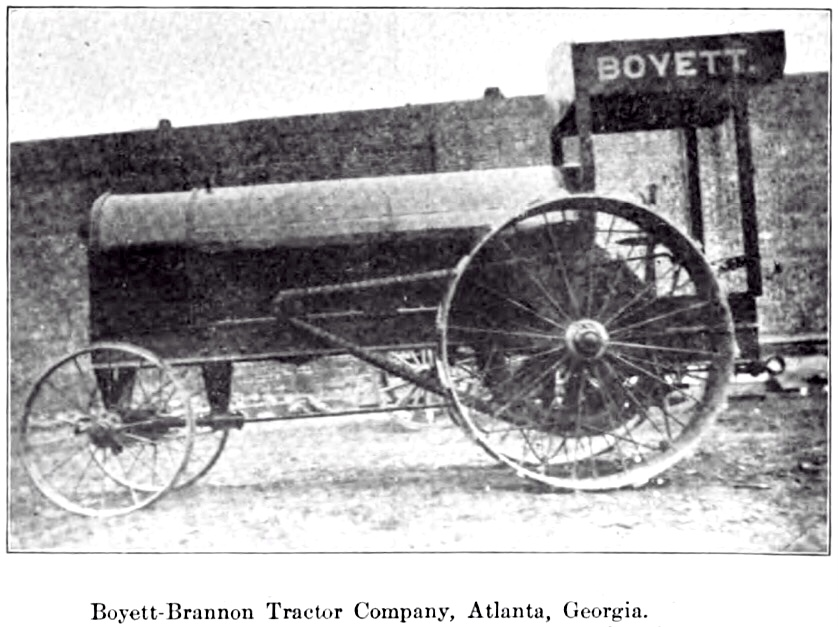
Boyett-Brannon (1913) 30 hp

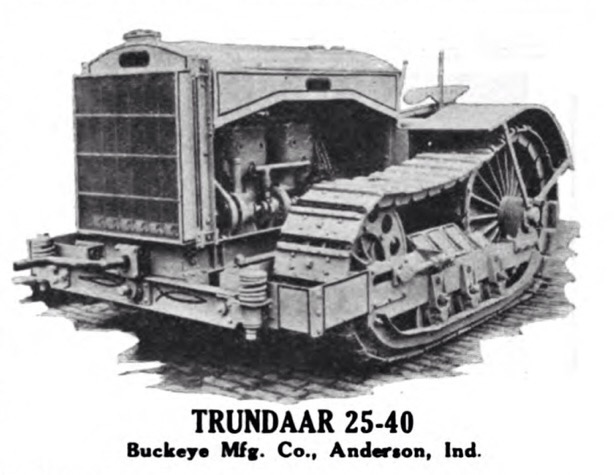
Buckeye Model 10 Tundaar 25-40

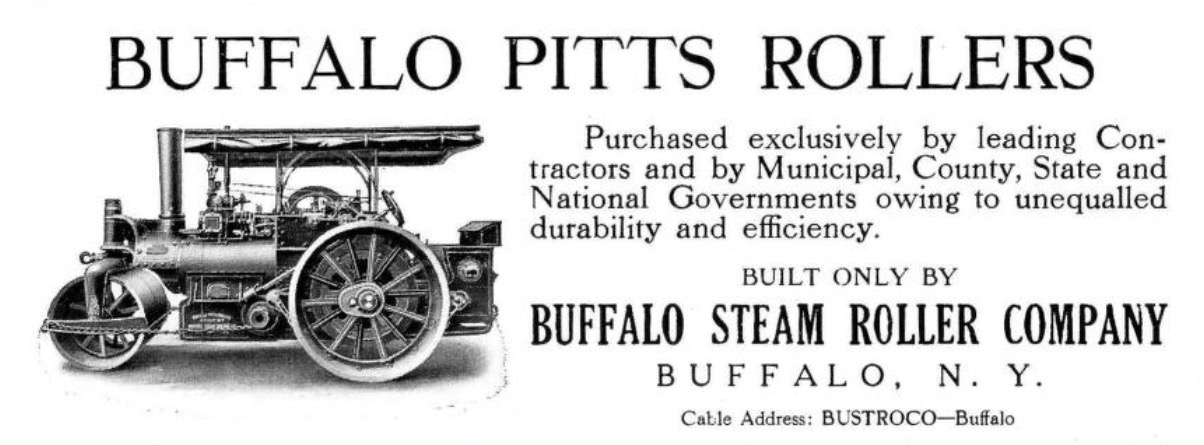
Buffalo Pitts (1915)

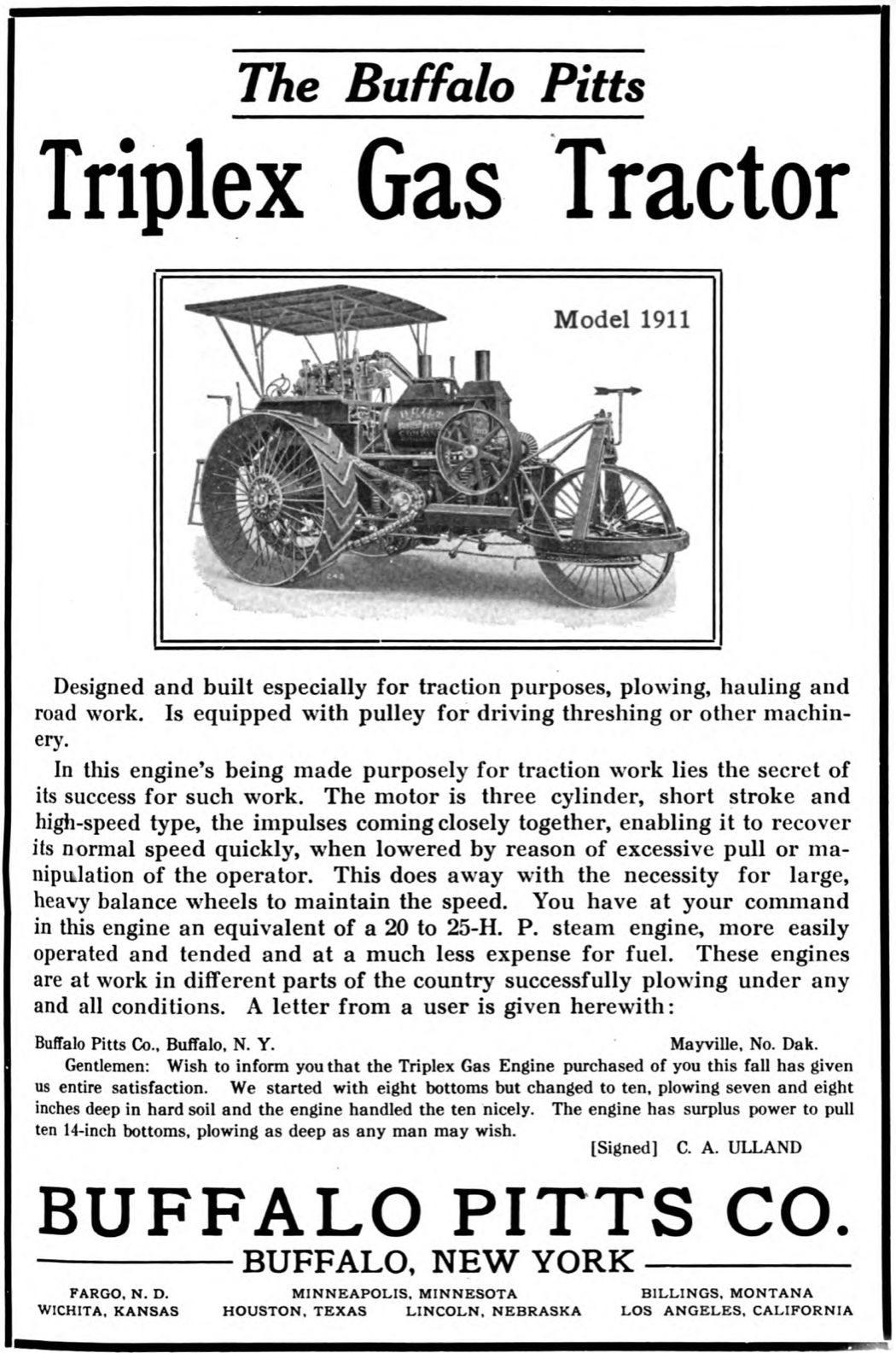
Buffalo-Pitts 40-70 three cylinder (1910-1914)

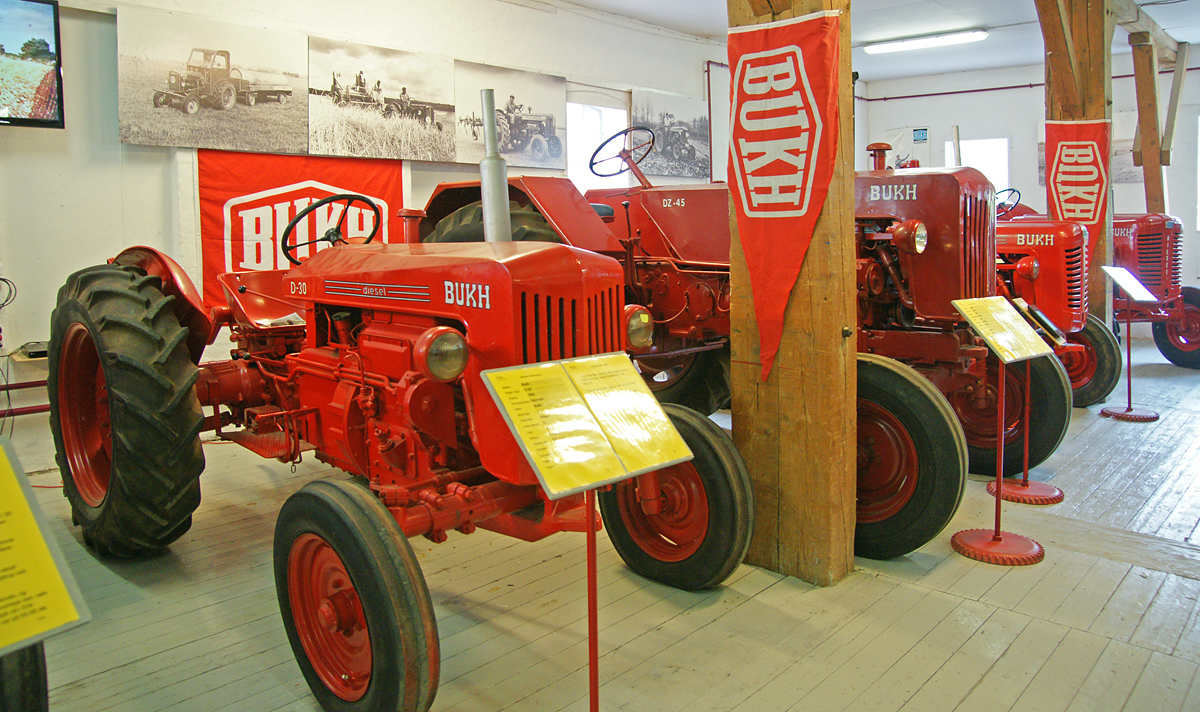
Danish Bukh tractors (1959–1966) from Danmarks Traktormuseum

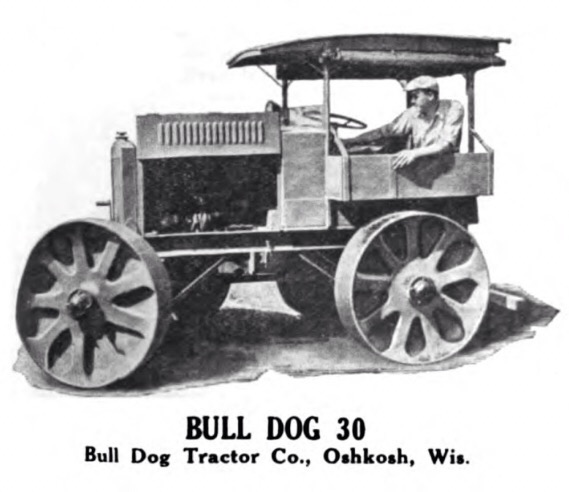
Bull Dog 30

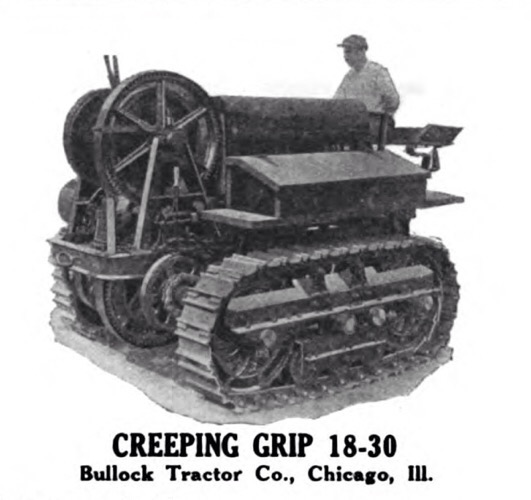
Bullock creeping grip 18-30

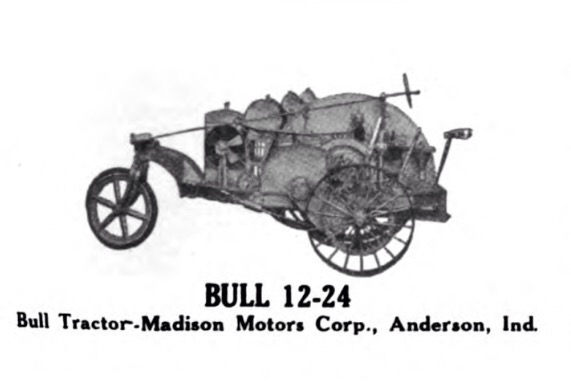
Bull Tractor 12-24

- B.F. Avery (USA)
- Babcock & Wilcox (Spain)
- Babiole (France)
- Backus (USA)
- Badley (USA)
- Baikonur IMT (Kazakhstan)
- Bailor (USA)
- Baines (USA)
- Baird (USA)
- Bajaj Tempo (India) – divested off and renamed Force Motors
- Baker, A.D. (USA) steam tractor
- Baldwin (Australia)
- Balilla (Italy)
- Balmar
- Balram (India)
- Bambi
- Bambia
- Bantam (USA)
- Banting Machine Co. (USA) steam tractor
- Barford & Perkins (England, UK)
- Bariole (France?)
- Barreiros (Spain)
- Baroncelli (Italy)
- Baskent (Turkey)
- Bates (USA)
- Bates Steel Mule (USA)
- Bauche (France)
- Bautz (Germany)
- Bean Spray (USA)
- Bear (USA)
- Bearcat (USA)
- Beaver (USA)
- Beeman (USA)
- Belazerus (Belarus)
- Bell, Robert (USA)
- Belleville (USA)
- Beltrail (USA)
- Ben (Italy)
- Benz-Sendling (Germany) Benz-Sendling
- Berliot (France)
- Berna (Switzerland)
- Bernardin (Argentina)
- Bertolini (Italy)
- Besser (USA)
- Best; Best Manufacturing Company (USA) – purchased by Holt; became Caterpillar Inc.
- Bethlehem (USA)
- Bettinson (United Kingdom) – Ford conversions
- Bi.Som.Trac (France)
- Big Bud (USA)
- Big Bull (USA)
- Big Four (USA)
- Big Lizzie (Australia)
- Bima (France)
- Birdsell Engine (USA) steam tractor
- Birrell (USA)
- Bischoff (Germany) Bischoff
- Bison (France)
- Bizon (Poland)
- BJR (Spain)
- Blackstone & Co (England, UK)
- Blanc-Plaiche (France?)
- Blaw-Knox (England, UK)
- Blumberg (USA) Blumberg
- BM Volvo (Sweden) – evolved into the current Valtra, part of AGCO Corporation
- BMB (England, UK) (British Motor Boats)
- BMC (England, UK) – from merger of Austin and Nuffield; later became Leyland, finally Marshall (Tractors)
- Bob (Germany) Bob
- Bobbette (USA)
- Boenker (USA)
- Bofors (Sweden)
- S.E. Boghos Pasha Nubar (Egypt) (Steam Tractor) produced by SLM
- Bohrer
- Bolens Division (USA) later MTD Holdings
- Bolgar (Bulgaria)
- Bolinder (Sweden) – merged with Munktell to become Bolinder-Munktell
- Bolinder-Munktell (Sweden) – merged with Volvo to become BM Volvo / Volvo BM
- Bolte (USA)
- Bori (Slovenia)
- Boring (USA)
- Borsig (Germany) Borsig
- BOS Hydro-Trac (Netherlands)
- Boyett-Brannon (USA)
- Bradley (USA)
- Bramont (Brazil) licensed production of tractors from Mahindra Bramont
- Brandt (France)
- Brasitalia (Brazil)
- Braud (France)
- Braun (Germany)
- Bray (England, UK)
- Bready (USA)
- Breda (Italy)
- Breed (USA)
- Bréheret (France)
- Brillion (USA)
- Bristol (England, UK) Bristol
- British Anzani (England, UK)
- British-Canadian (USA)
- British Wallis (United Kingdom)
- Brockway (USA)
- Brons (Netherlands)
- Brown (Australia)
- Brown (USA)
- Bruff – Ford conversions
- Brummer
- Bruneau (France)
- Bryan (USA)Bryan
- BTG (Germany)
- BTW
- Bubba (Italy)
- Bücher (Switzerland)
- Buckeye (USA)
- Buffalo
- Buffalo-Pitts (USA) steam tractor
- Bugaud (France)
- BUKH (Denmark) BUKH
- Bührer (Switzerland) Bührer
- Bull (USA)
- Bull Dog (USA)
- Bulldawg
- Bull-Madison (USA)
- Bullock (USA) formerly Western Implement & Motor Company
- Bulltra
- Bungartz (Germany)
- Bungartz & Peschke (Germany)
- Bunton
- Burn-Oil (USA)
- Burrell (England, UK)
- Busatto (Italy)
- Bush Hog (USA) see Zero-turn mower
- BWS
- Byers Machine Company (USA)
- Byron Jackson Machine Works (USA) steam tractor

== C ==
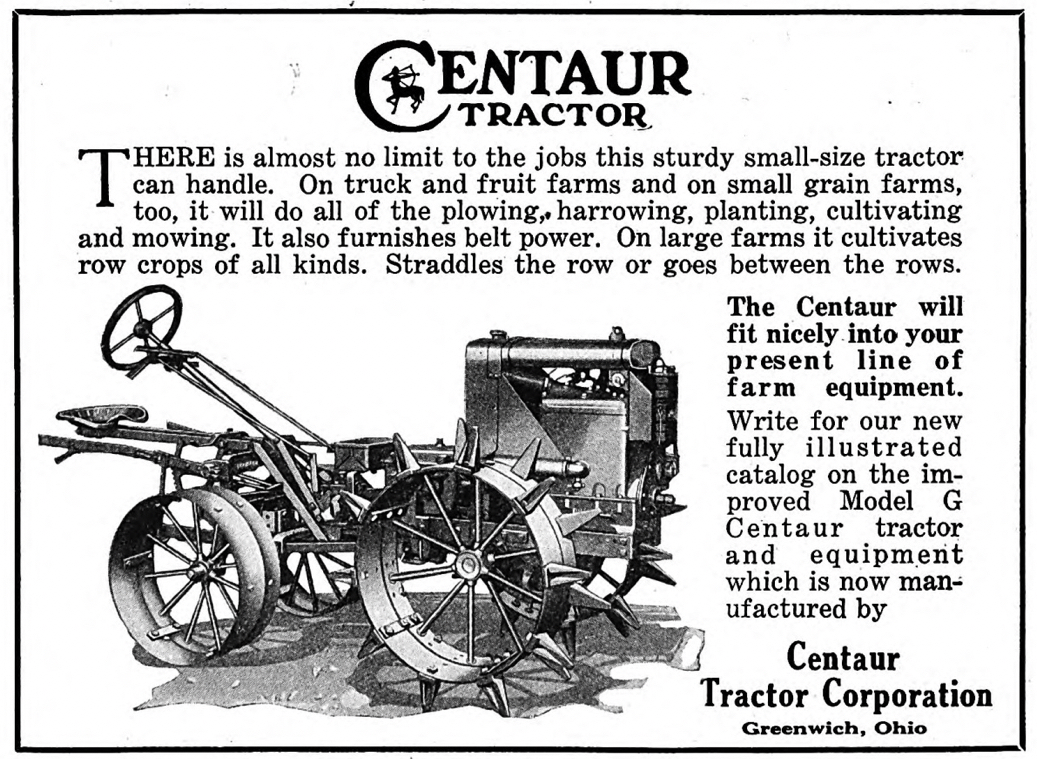
Centaur Tractor

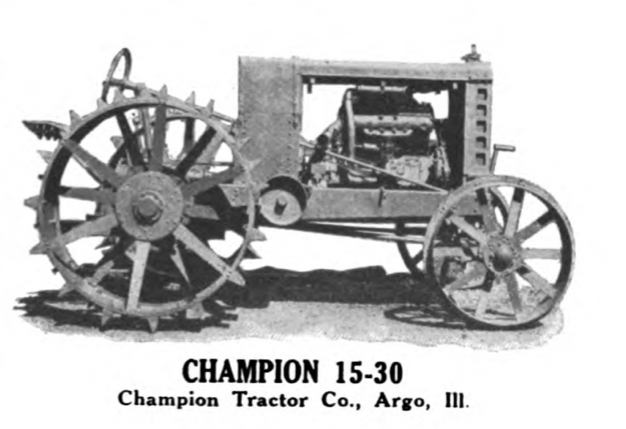
Champion 15-30

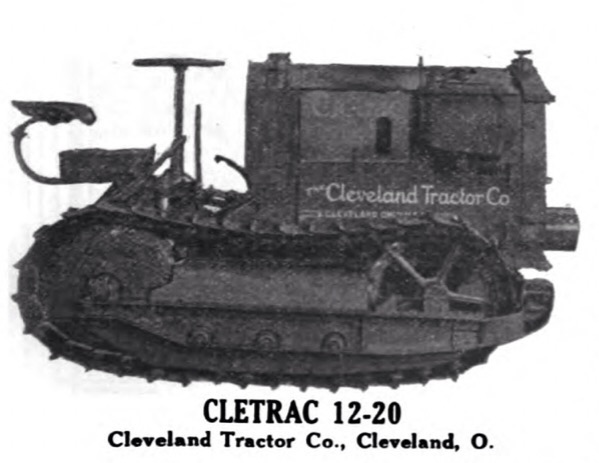
Cleveland Cletrac 12-20

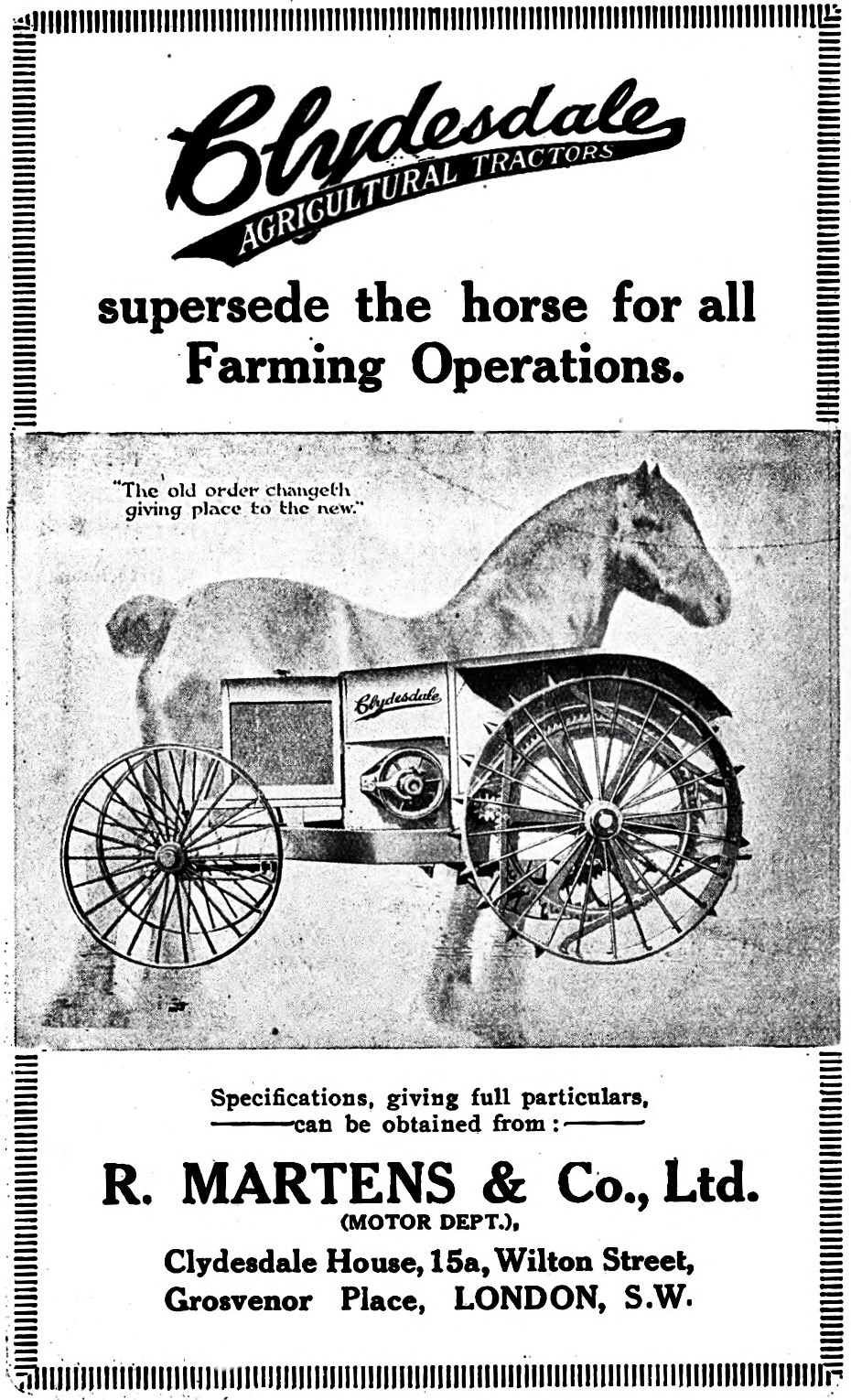
Clydesdale (1918)

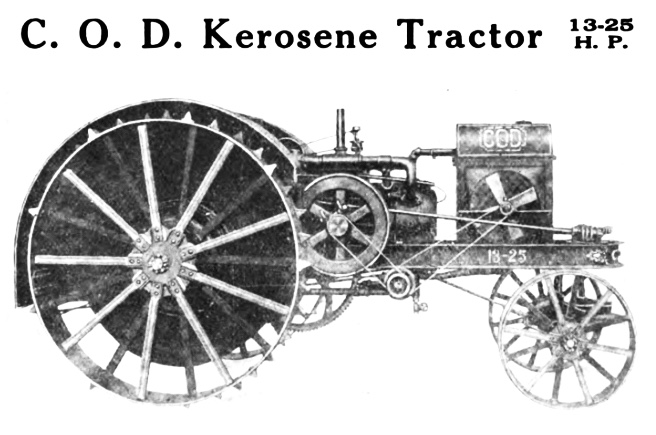
C.O.D 13-25 (1916-1919)

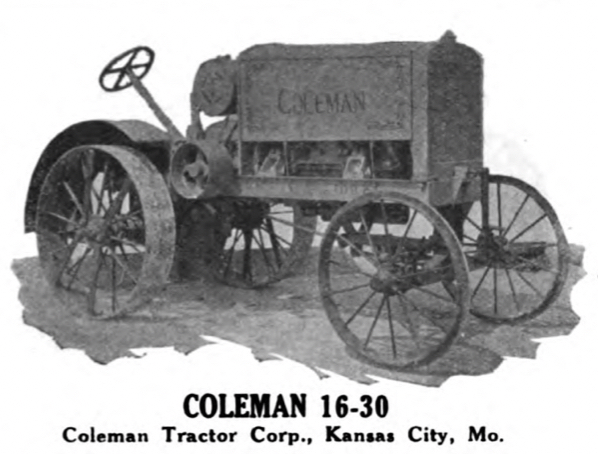
Coleman 16-30

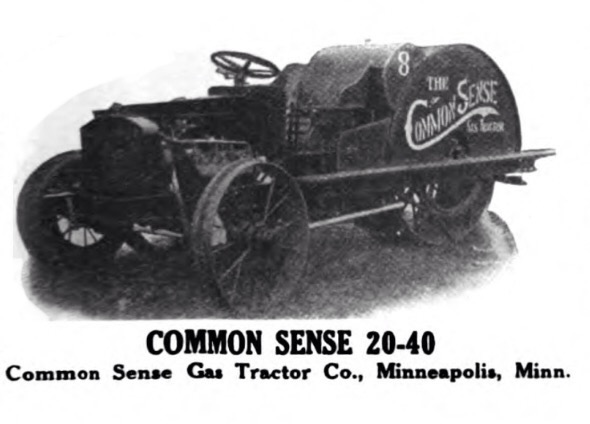
Common Sense 20-40

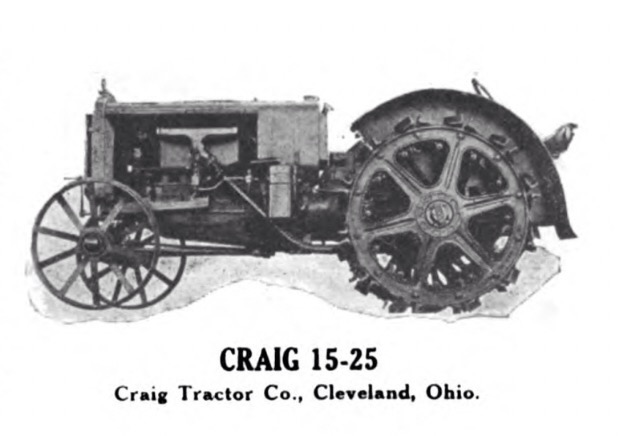
Craig 15-25

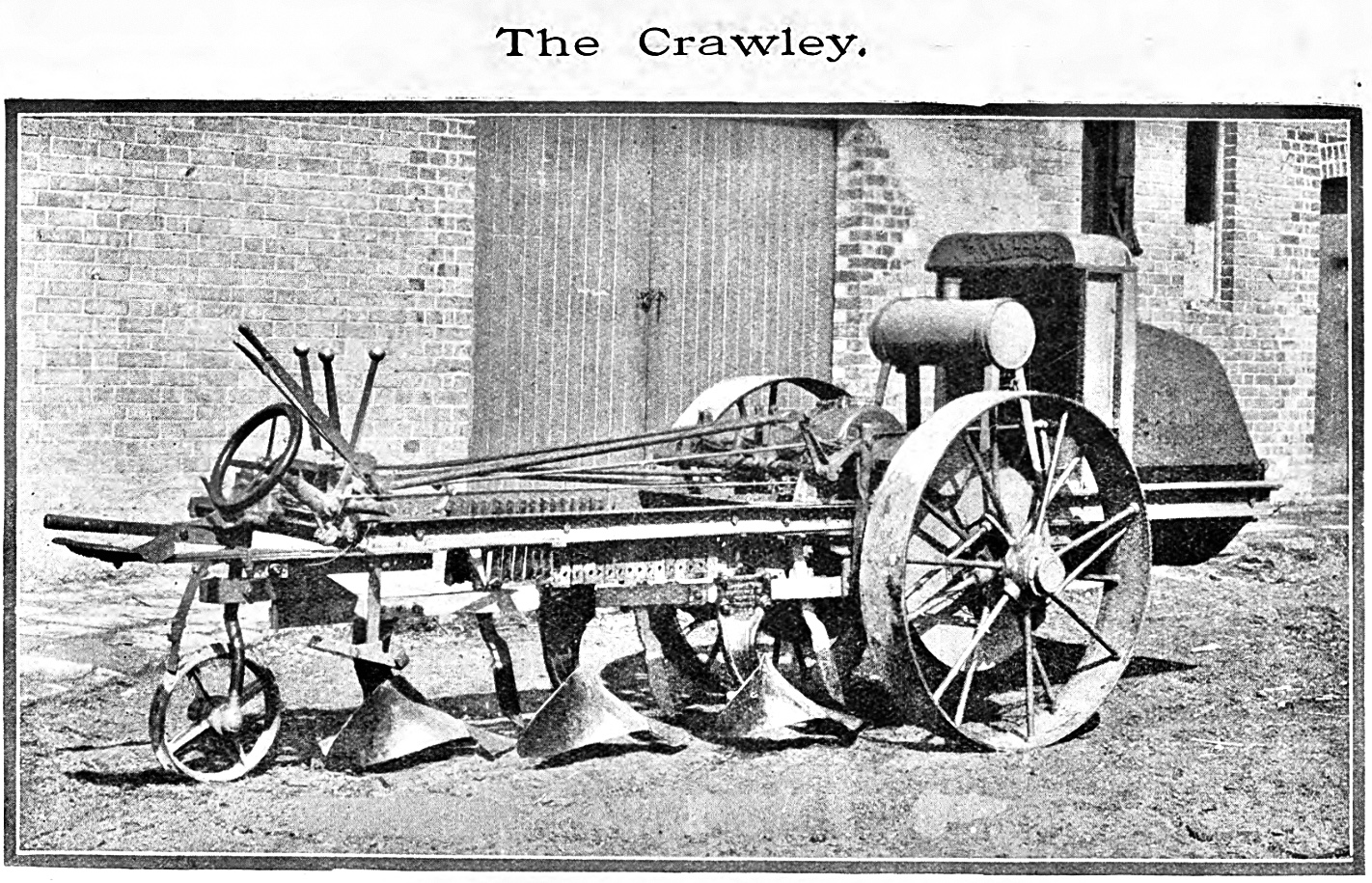
Crawley 30 hp (1914-1924)

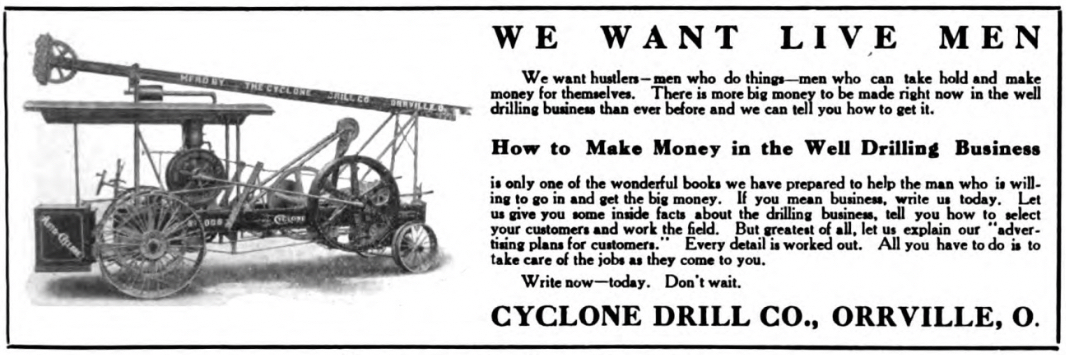
Cyclone Drill (1911)

- C. & G. Cooper (USA)
- C.L. Best (USA)
- Cadine (France)
- Caldwell (Australia) – became Caldwell Vale
- Caldwell Vale (Australia)
- Calmescri (Brazil)
- Calsa (Spain)
- Cameco (USA) – sold to John Deere
- Cameron (USA)
- Camisa
- Campagnolo (Italy)
- Canadian (Canada)
- Canadian-American (Canada / USA)
- CanTRAN
- Canycom
- Carter
- Case Corporation (USA) – purchased by Tenneco, and later merged with International Harvester to become Case IH
- Case de France (France) steam tractor
- Case New Holland (India)
- Case, J.I (USA) – was purchased by Massey-Harris
- Cassani (Italy) Cassani
- CAST (Italy)
- Caterpillar (USA) – sold tractor business to AGCO Corp.
- Cayuga (USA)
- CBT – Companhia Brasileira de Tratores (Brazil)
- CDHL (USA)
- Celtic (France)
- Centaur (USA)
- Centaur (France)
- Centenario
- Century (USA)
- Ceres (France)
- Ceres (India) – brand of International Tractors (Sonalika)
- Certified (USA)
- Challenger Tractor (USA)
- Chamberlain (Australia) – purchased by Deere & Company
- Chambon (France) Chambon
- Champ (Thailand)
- Champion (USA)
- Champion (France)
- Chapron (France)
- Chase (USA, 1908–1918; Canada, 1919-1921)
- Chaseside (England, UK)
- Chief Tractor (USA)
- Chery (China) – became Detank, now Zoomlion
- Cherry (Japan)
- CIDEF (Argentina)
- CIMAC (Italy)
- Citroen (France)
- Claeys (Belgium)
- Clarktor
- Clayson (England, UK)
- Clayton & Shuttleworth (England, UK)
- Clayton Wagons (England, UK)
- Cleveland Tractor Company/Cletrac (USA) – purchased by the Oliver Corporation in 1944 Cletrac
- Clydesdale (USA) connection to Clydesdale Motor Truck Company ?
- CMC (Argentina)
- CNC (France)
- Cobey (USA)
- Cockshutt Plow Company (Canada) – purchased by White Farm Equipment
- Cockshutt Hart-Parr (Canada)
- C.O.D (USA)
- Codem (The Netherlands)
- Colean (USA) steam tractor
- Coleman (USA)
- Colpron (Canada) – rebadged Landini's
- Colt (USA)
- Common Sense (USA)
- COMPACT Junior (Austria)
- Conord
- Consolidated (USA)
- Continental (USA)
- Co-op (USA)
- Co-op (National Farm Machinery) (USA)
- Co-op Implements (Canada)
- Cooper
- Corbitt (USA)
- Cornbelt Tractor (USA)
- Corliss (USA)
- County (England, UK)
- Crawley Agrimotor (England, UK)
- Crystal Zetor (Czech)
- Csepel (Hungary)
- CTM
- Cultivac
- Cultor (USA)
- Custom (USA)
- Cutherbertson – James A. Cuthbertson (Scotland, UK)
- Cyclone Drill (USA)

== D ==
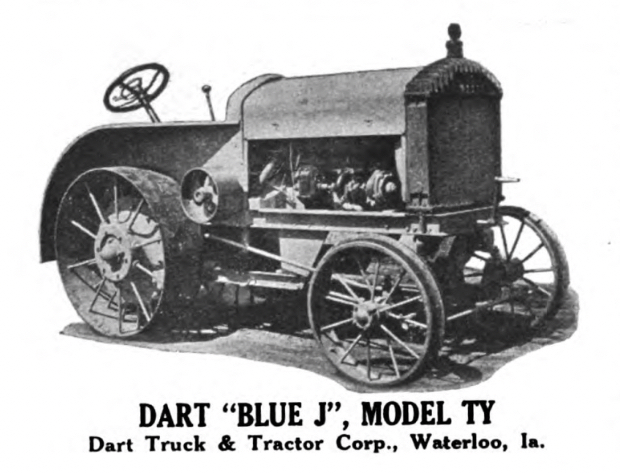
Dart Model TY „Blue J“

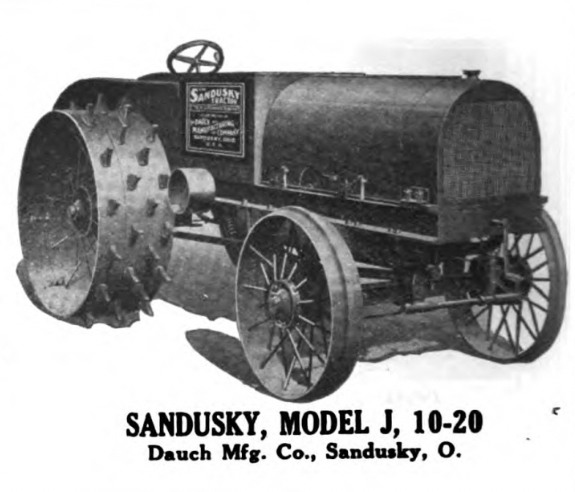
Dauch Sandusky Model J 10-20

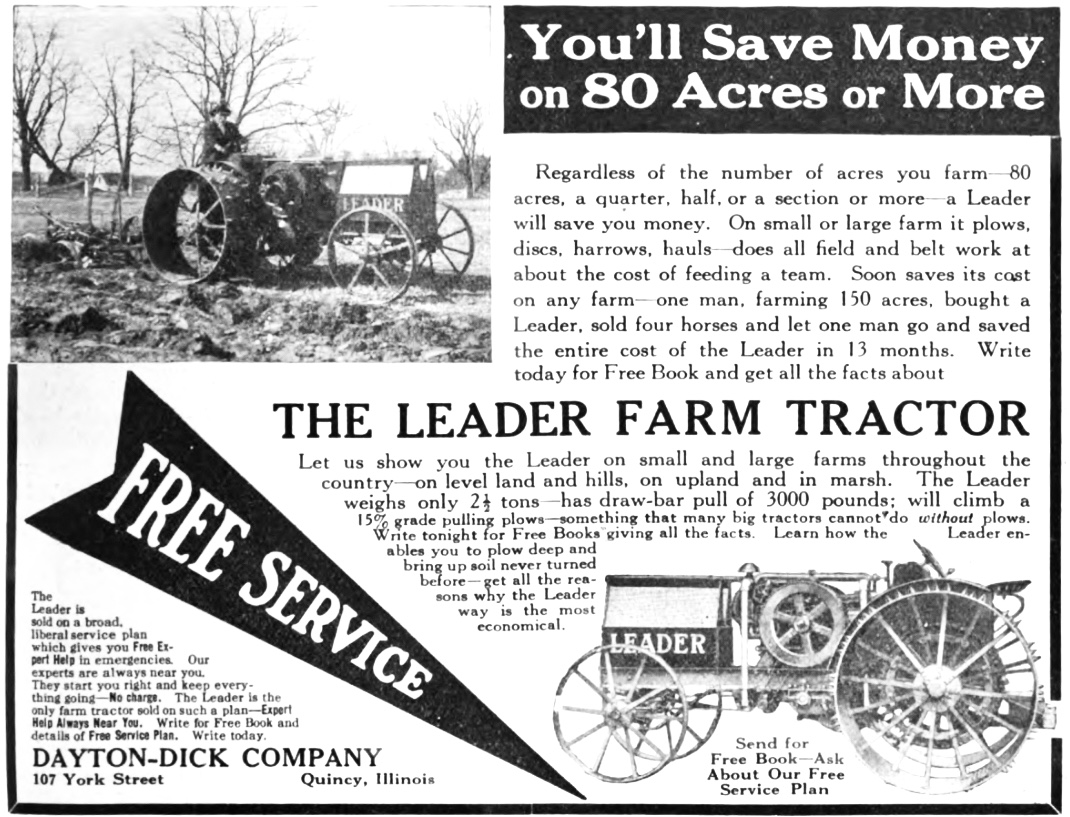
Dayton-Dick

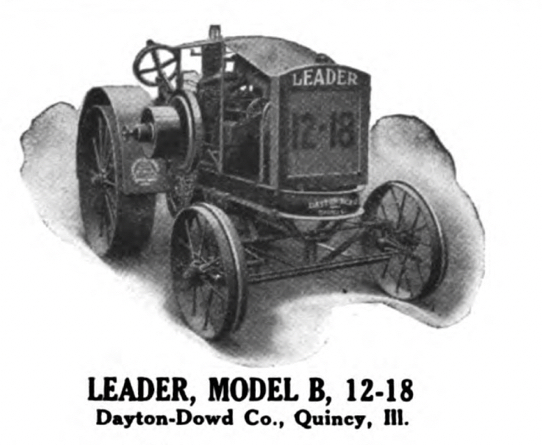
Dayton-Dowd Leader Model B 12-18

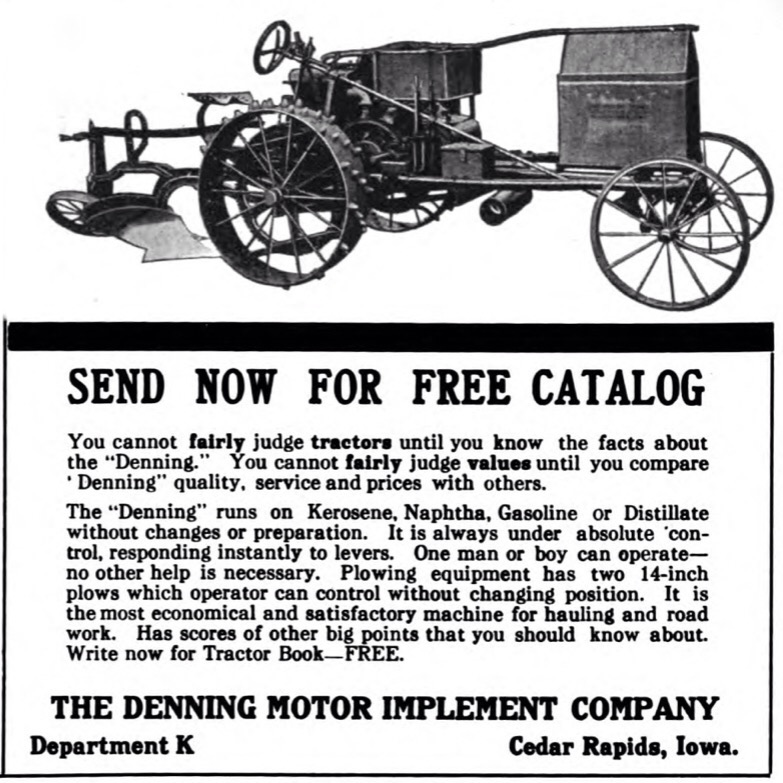
Denning 6-12 (1913-1916)

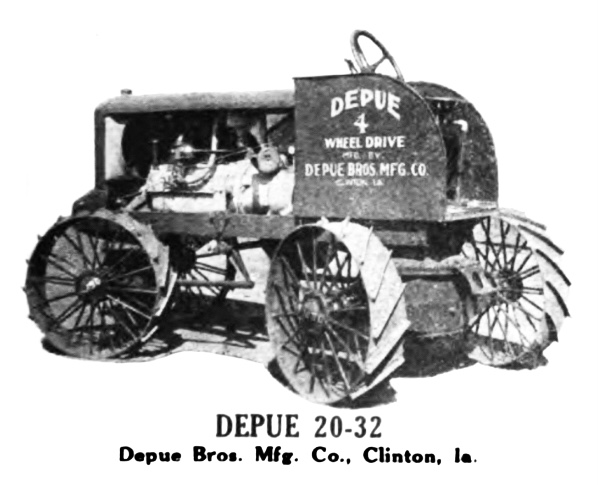
Depue 20-32

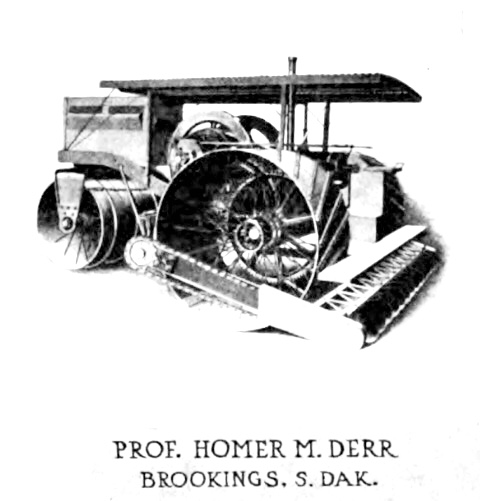
Derr (1911)

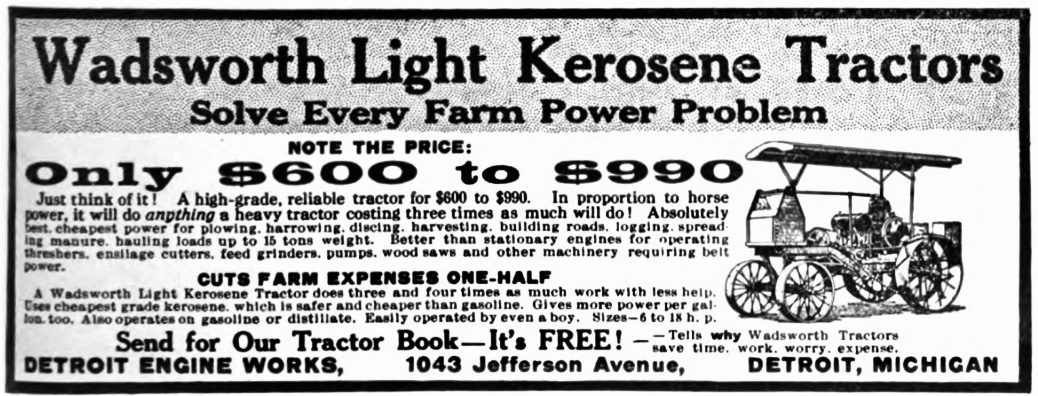
Detroit Engine Works (1911-1916) Wadsworth tractor

- Daimler (Germany) Benz-Sendling
- Daimler-Benz (Germany)
- Dammann (USA)
- Danhorse (Denmark) Danhorse
- Dart (USA)
- Dasse (Belgium) Dasse
- Dauch (USA)
- Davey Paxman & Co. (England, UK)
- David Bradley (plowman) (USA)
- David Brown Ltd. (England, UK) – purchased by Tenneco and renamed Case
- Dayton-Dick (USA) renamed Dayton-Dowd
- Dayton-Dowd (USA)
- DECA (Argentina)
- De Dion Bouton (France)
- Deering (USA) – merged with other manufacturers to form International Harvester
- Derr (USA)
- Defaut (France)
- Deganello (Italy) Deganello
- Delahaye (France)
- Delaunay-Belleville (France)
- Delieuvin (France)
- Demmler (USA)
- Denning (USA)
- Dongfeng (China) – DFAM
- Depue (USA)
- Dessaules (France)
- Detank (China) – now Zoomlion
- Detroit (USA)
- Deuliewag (Germany)
- Deutz (Germany) – merged with Fahr
- Deutz-Allis (Germany / USA) – formed when Deutz-Fahr bought Allis-Chalmers; purchased by AGCO and became AGCO-Allis
- Dexheimer (Germany) Dexheimer
- DF (China)
- Dill (USA)
- Diana (Greece)
- Ditch Witch
- Dobry (Czech)
- Dompmartin (France)
- DongFangHong (China) – now YTO
- Doppstadt (Germany) Doppstadt
- Doyen (Belgium)
- Dragon (USA)
- Drexler (Austria)
- Dromson (Germany)
- Dubois (France)
- Dufuat
- Durany (Argentina)
- DUTRA (Hungary) DUTRA
- DUTRA Steyr (Hungary)

== E ==
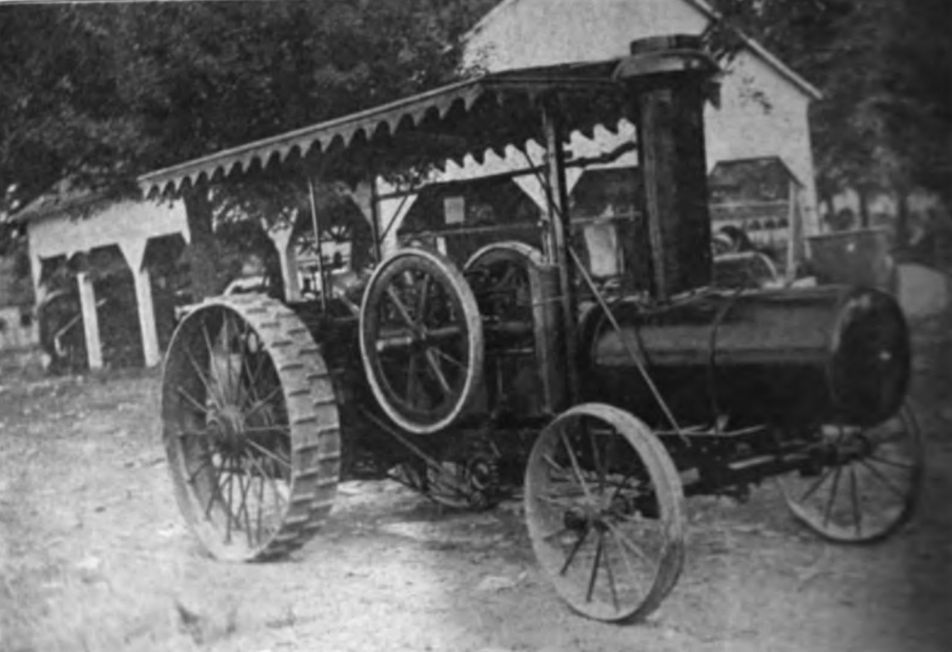
Eaton Gas Engine (1912-1913)

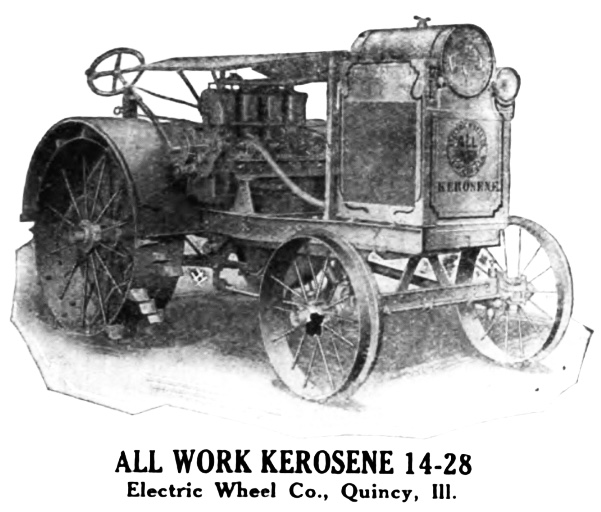
Electric Wheel All Work Kerosene 14-28

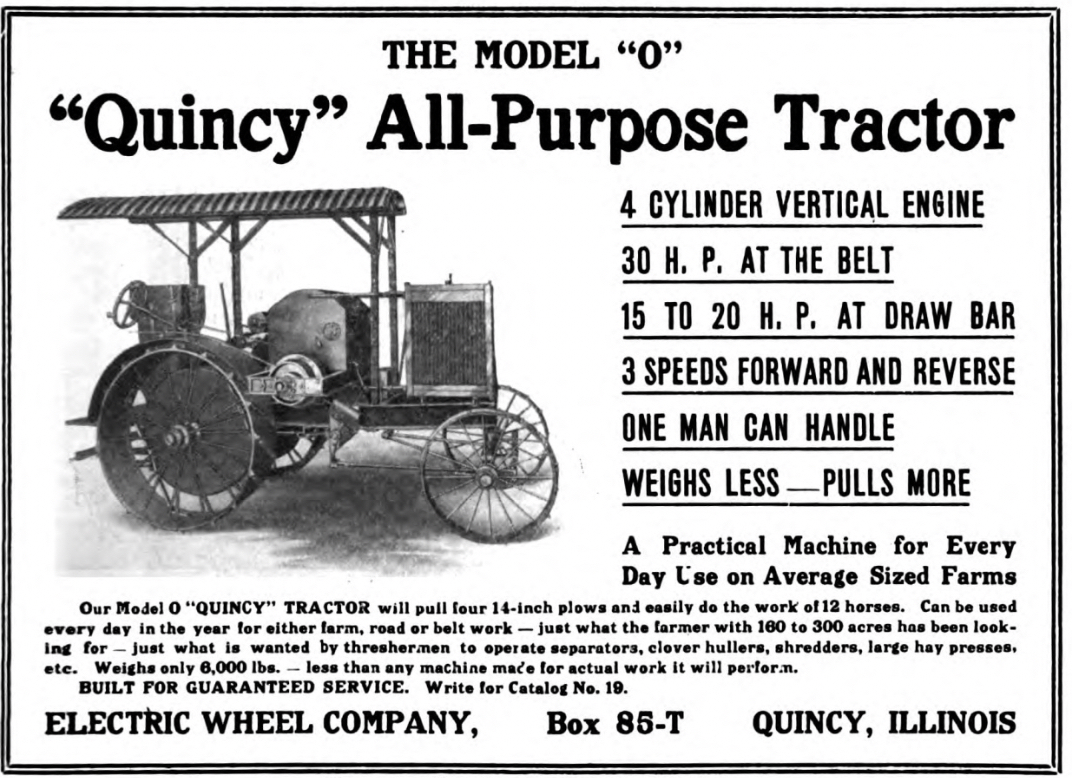
Electric Wheel Model 0 15-30 Quincy (1912)

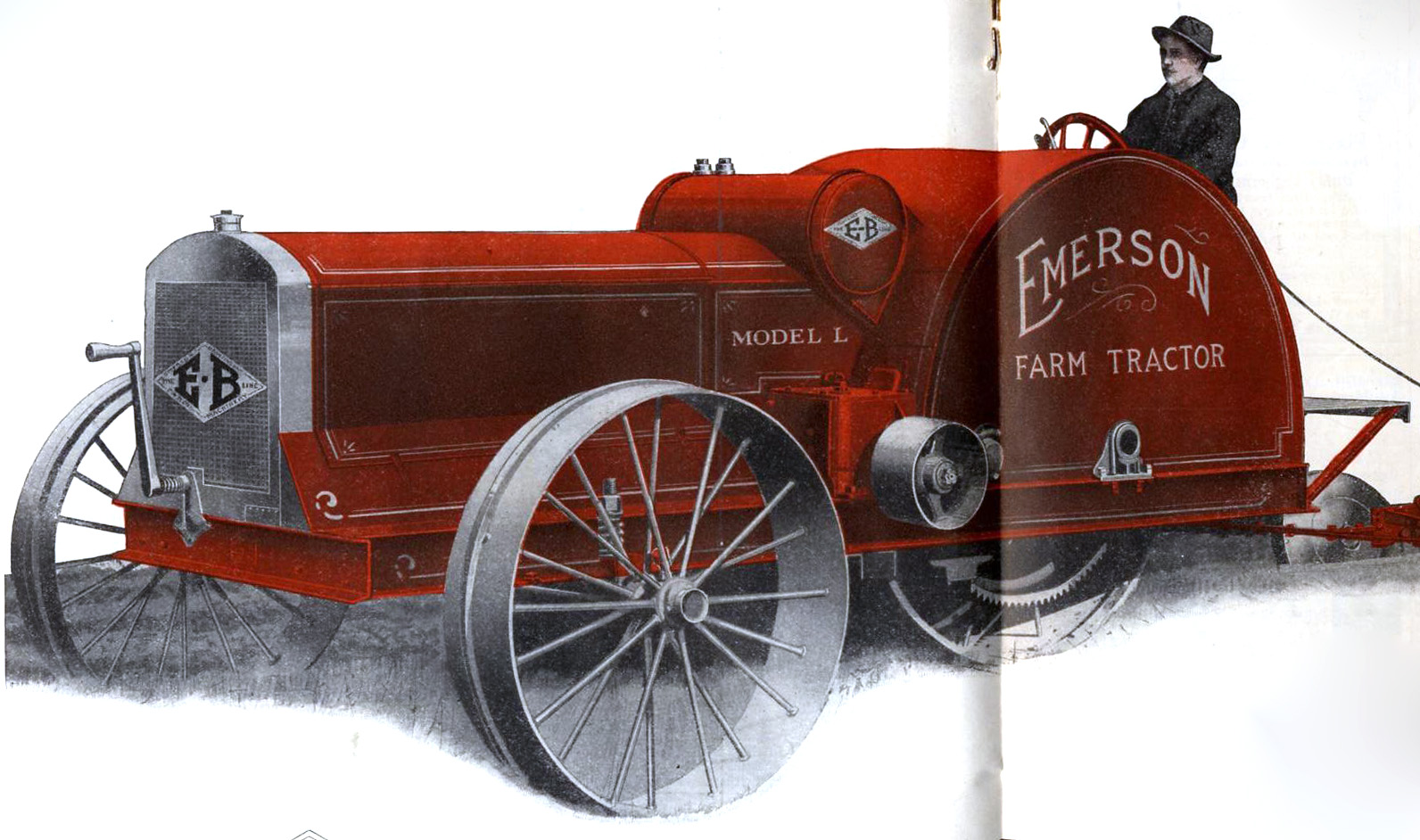
1916 Emerson Tractor, made by Emerson-Brantingham (USA)

Emerson-Brantingham advertisement (1919)

- Eagle (USA)
- Eaton Gas Engine (USA)
- Ebro (Spain)
- Ebro-Kubota (Spain)
- Eclipse (USA)
- Eco (France)
- Edwin Alber
- E.F.Townsend (USA)
- Eibner (Sweden)
- Eicher (Germany)
- Eicher Goodearth (India) – became just Eicher
- Eimco (USA)
- Ekip (Turkey) – became Fatih Traktor
- El Chiquito (Argentina)
- Electric Wheel (USA)
- G.W. Elliott & Co. (USA)
- EMCO (USA) – later Power Horse
- Emerson (Canada)
- Emerson-Brantingham (USA)
- Empire (USA)
- Engineering Products Company (USA)
- Ensinger (Germany) Ensinger
- Enter (Turkey)
- Enti (The Netherlands)
- Epple-Buxbaum (Austria)
- Erickson (USA)
- Escanuela (Argentina)
- Euro-Trac (India)

== F ==
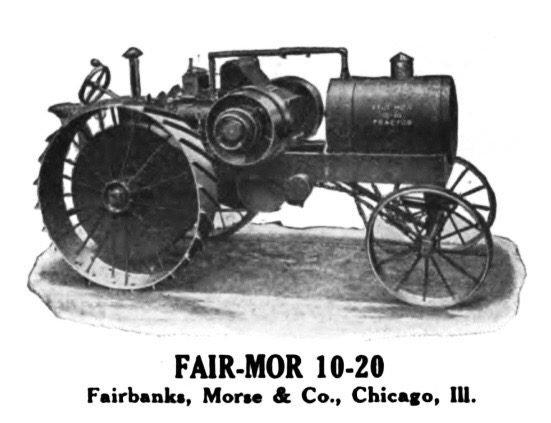
Fairbanks Fair-Mor 10-20

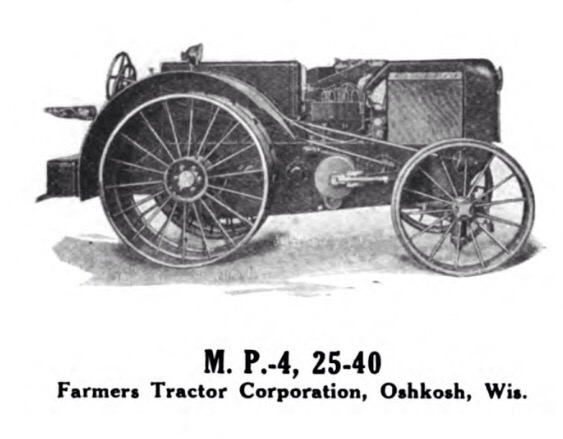
Farmers Tractor M.P.-4 25-40

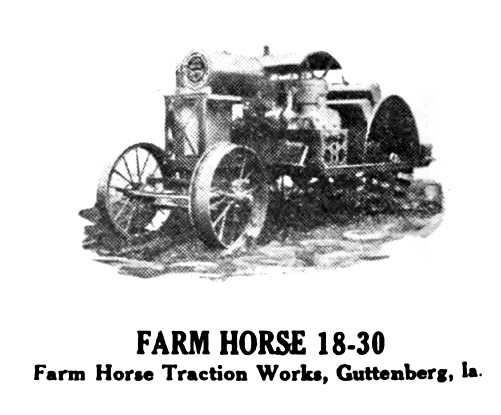
Farm Horse 18-30

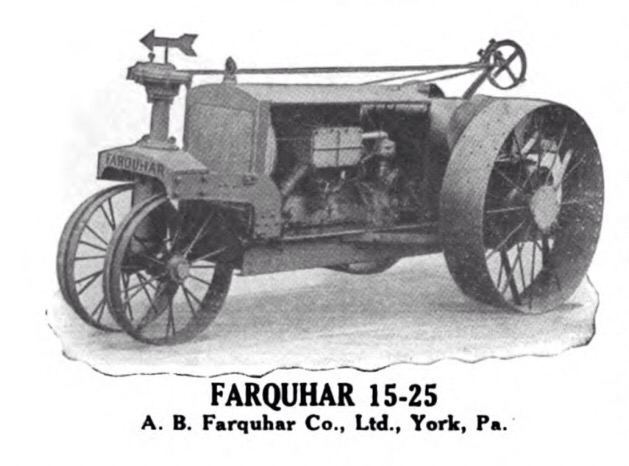
Farquhar 15-25

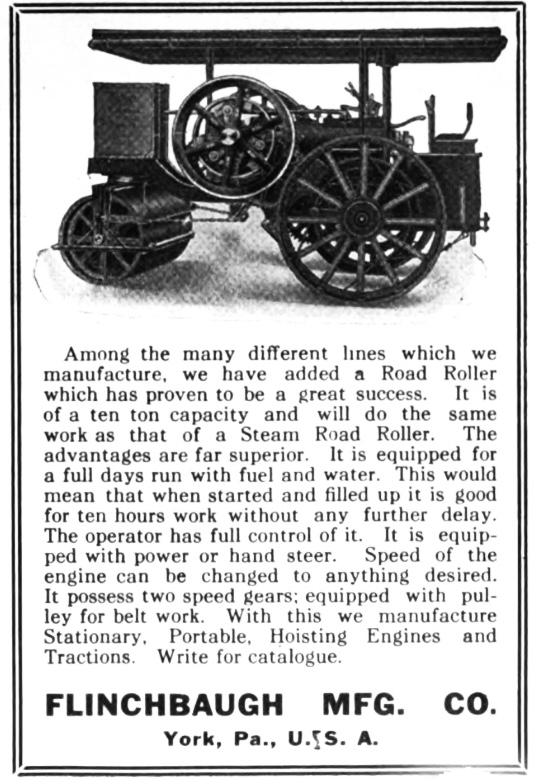
Flinchbaugh

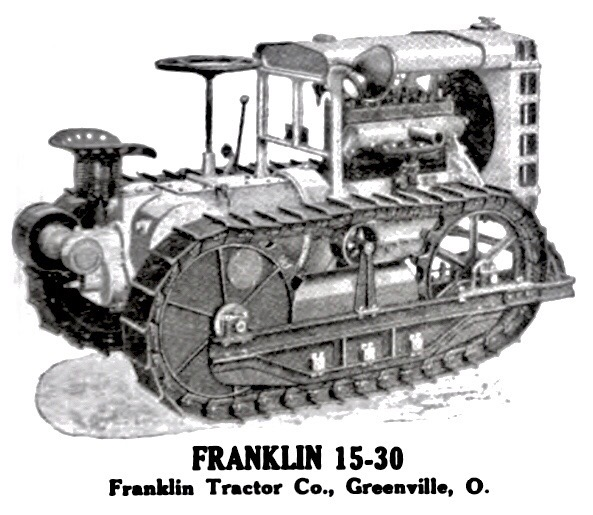
Franklin 15-30

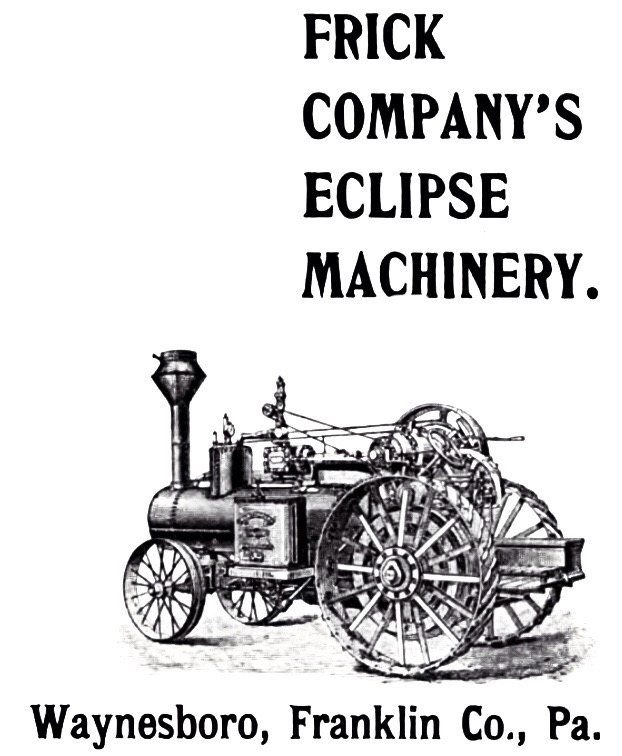
Frick Steam Tractor (1897)

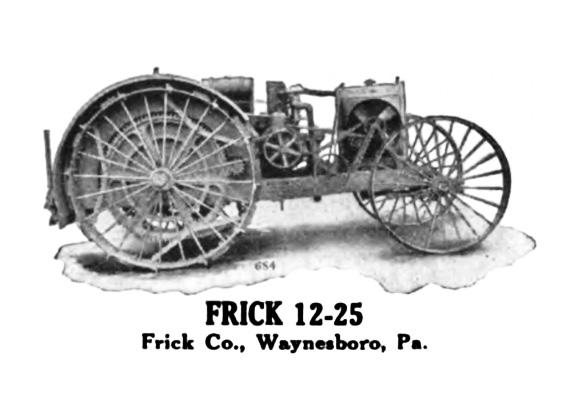
Frick 12-25

- Fageol (USA)
- Fahr (Germany) – merged with Deutz to become Deutz-Fahr Fahr
- Fairbanks, Morse & Co. (USA)
- Fairbanks Steam Shovel (USA) steam tractor
- Fairmont Gas Engine & Ry. Motor Car Co. (USA)
- Falke-trac (Germany)
- FAMO (Germany)
- Famous (USA) Famous
- Famulus (Germany) Famulus
- F.A.R. (France)
- Farm Ette (USA)
- Farm System
- Farmall (USA) – by International Harvester
- Farmár (Czech)
- Farmaster (USA)
- Farmcrest (USA)
- Farm Horse (USA)
- Farmers Tractor (USA)
- Farmer's Union Co-op (USA)
- FarmHandy (USA)
- Farmliner Daedong (Australia) – built in South Korea
- Farmobile (USA)
- Farmwell (England, UK)
- Farquhar, A. B. (USA) – merged into the Oliver Corporation
- Fate Root-Heath (USA)
- Fatsia (England, UK) – formerly B.Welsh agri
- Favias (Spain)
- FBW (Switzerland)
- Federal Foundry (USA)
- FengShou (China) – now Jiangling, part of Mahindra
- Ferdinand Machine Works (USA) steam tractor
- Ferguson (Ireland)
- Ferguson-Brown (England, UK)
- Feuillette (France)
- Fiat OM
- Fiat Someca (France)
- Fiat-Agrifull (Italy)
- Fiatagri (Italy) Fiatagri
- Fiat-Goldstar (South Korea) – now LS-New Holland
- Fiat Trattori (Italy)
- Field Marshall (England, UK) – became Marshall
- Filtz-Grivolas (France) Automobiles Filtz
- Finn Ursus
- Fitch Four Drive (USA)
- Flinchbaugh (USA)
- FNM-Fiat (Brazil)
- Foden (England, UK)
- Foote (USA)
- Ford SAF
- Ford (USA) – Ford tractor division bought Sperry-New Holland and became Ford-New Holland, now New Holland, part of CNH Industrial
- Ford-Ferguson (USA)
- Fordson tractor (USA / England, UK) – by Ford
- Fordzon-Putilovec (Russia) Fordzon-Putilovec
- Forma (Romania)
- Fortschritt (East Germany)
- Foster-Daimler (England, UK)
- Foton (China) – now Lovol
- Four Drive (USA) – also known as Fitch Four Drive
- Four Wheel Traction (England, UK)
- Fowler (England, UK)
- Frick (USA)
- Froehlich (USA) – purchased by Deere & Company
- Fundinoza (Argentina)
- Fujian (China)
- Futian (China) – changed to Foton, now Lovol
- Futian Leopard (China) – now Foton or Foton Leopard
- Futian Oubao (China) – changed to Foton, now Lovol
- Fuyang Tractor (China)
  - Benniu
- FWD Wagner (USA)

== G ==
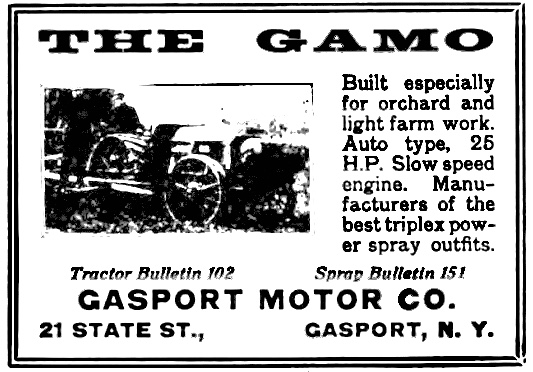
Gasport Motor 25 hp (1911-1912)

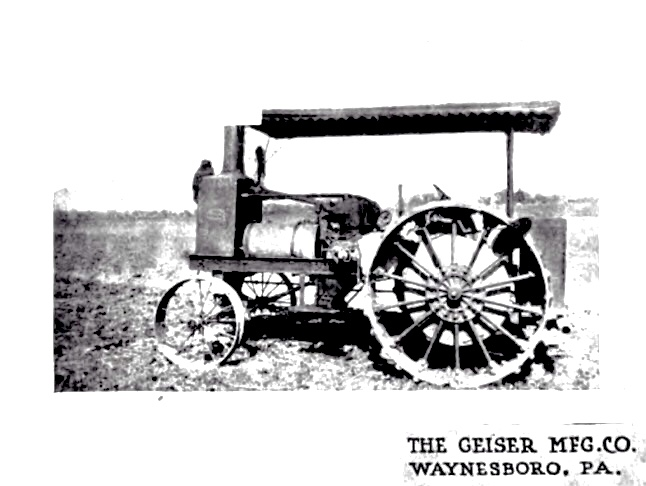
Geiser (1909-1913)

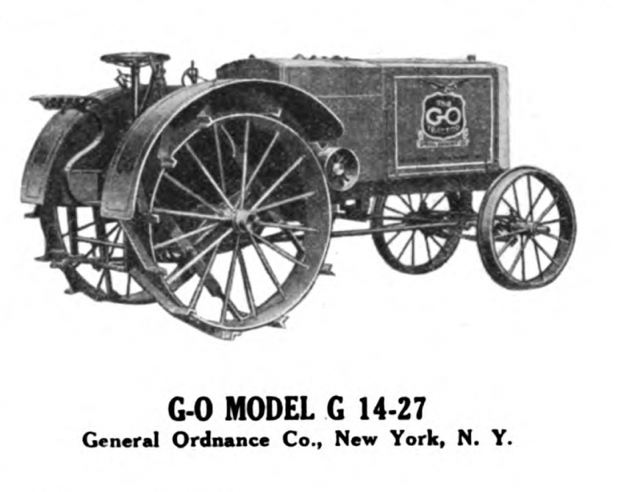
General Ordnance Model G 14-27

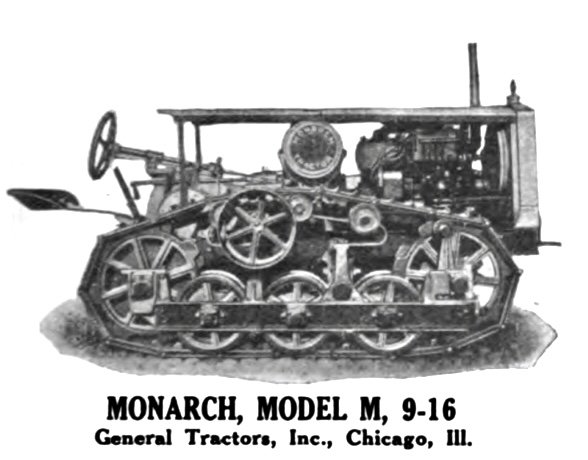
General Tractors Monarch Model M 9-16

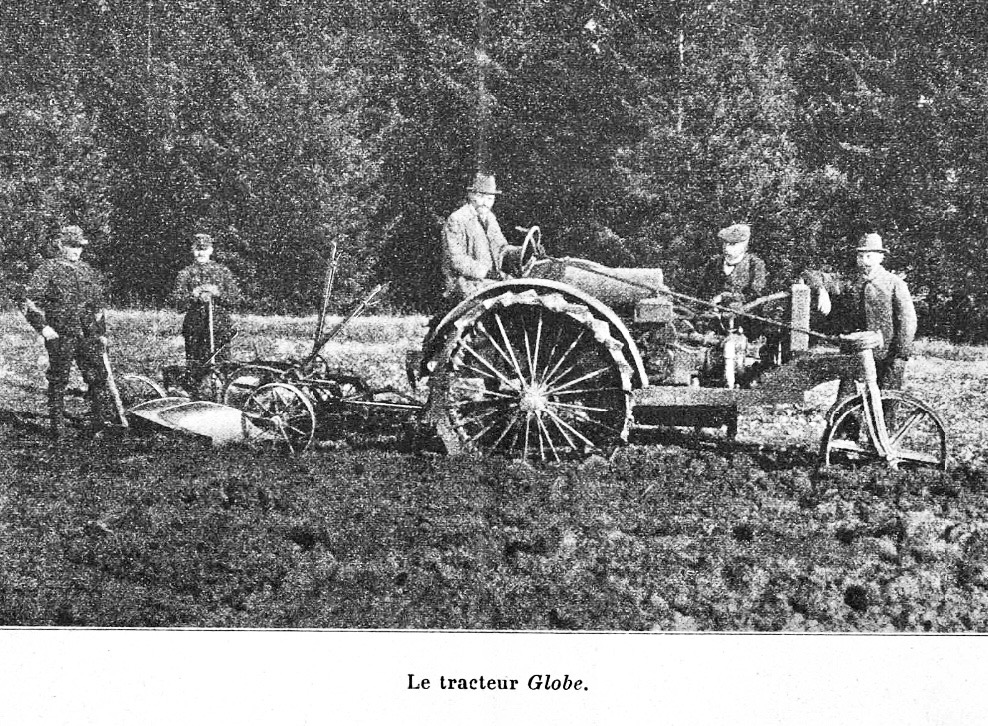
Globe tractor France (1918)

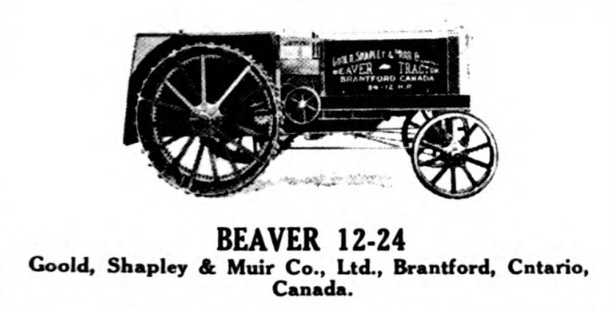
Goold Shapley & Muir Beaver 12-24

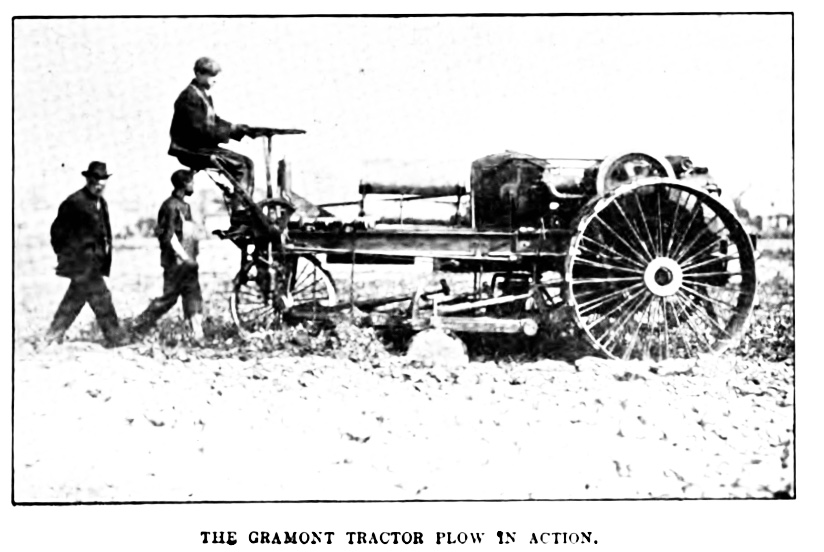
Gramont Tractor Plow Company (1913) four cylinder 35 hp

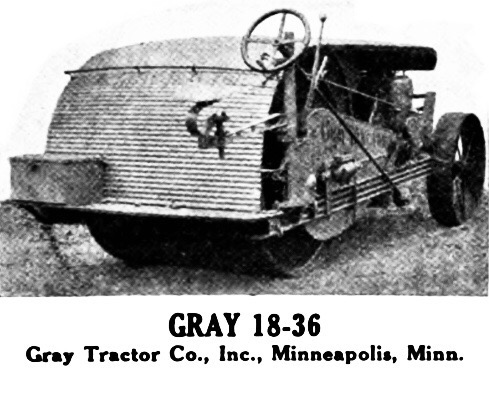
Gray 18-36

- Galardi e Patuzzo (Italy)
- Gallerani Licinio & Figlio (Italy) Gallerani Licinio & Figlio
- Galloway (USA)
- Gambino (Italy) Fratelli Gambino
- Gambles Farmcrest (USA)
- Gasport Motor (USA)
- Gardner (England or Belgium)
- Garner (England, UK)/ (USA)
- Garrett (USA)
- Garrett (England, UK) – steam tractors and showmen's engines
- Gaar-Scott (USA)
- Galion Iron Works (USA)
- Gas Traction Company (USA)
- GBT (USA)
- GEDA (Romania)
- GeDe (The Netherlands)
- Gehl
- Geiser (USA)
- General (USA)
- General Ordnance (USA)
- General Tractors (USA)
- General (England, UK)
- George (USA)
- Giaguaro (Italy)
- Gibbons & Robinson
- Gibson Mfg. (USA)
- Gilson (Canada)
- Glasgow (England, UK)
- Global (USA)
- Globe (France)
- Gloppe (France)
- GMW (Sweden)
- Goold Shapley & Muir (USA)
- Goldoni (Italy)
- GoldStar (South Korea) – later LG; now LS
- Gougis (France)
- Graham-Bradley (USA)
- Gramont Tractor Plow Company (USA)
- Granich (Germany) Granich
- Gravely (USA)
- Gray (USA) Gray
- Greaves (India) – later SAME Greaves
- Green (England, UK)
- Greyhound (USA)
- Griffin (USA)
- Grillet (France)
- Grissly
- Grossi (Argentina) – now T&M Grossi
- Grossi Migra (Argentina) – now T&M Grossi
- Grunder (Switzerland)
- Gualdi (Italy)
- Güldner (Germany) – later part of Linde
- Gulliver (Italy) – now SEP
- Guthelfer (Spain)

== H ==
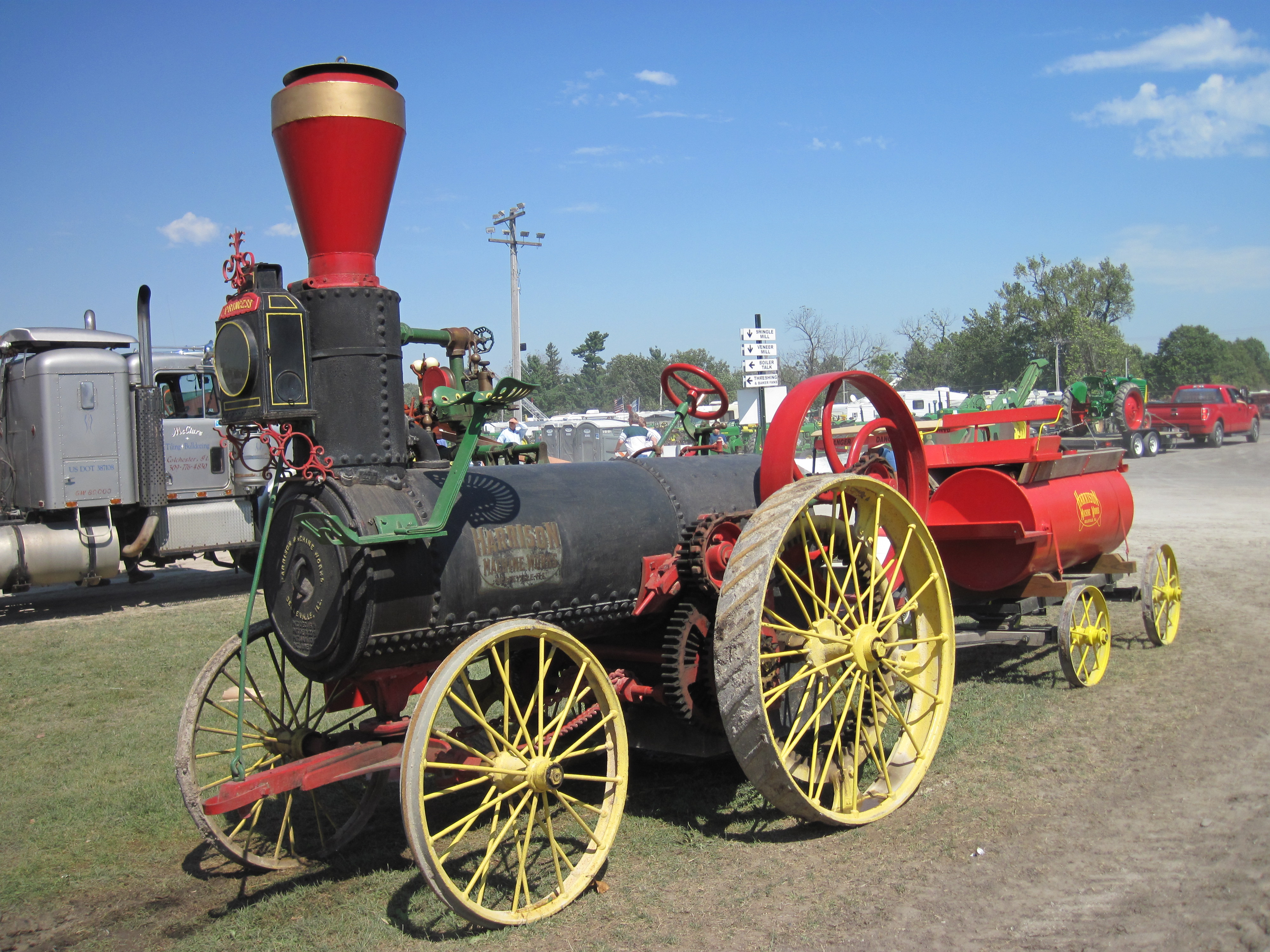
Harrison Machine Works 1882 tractor

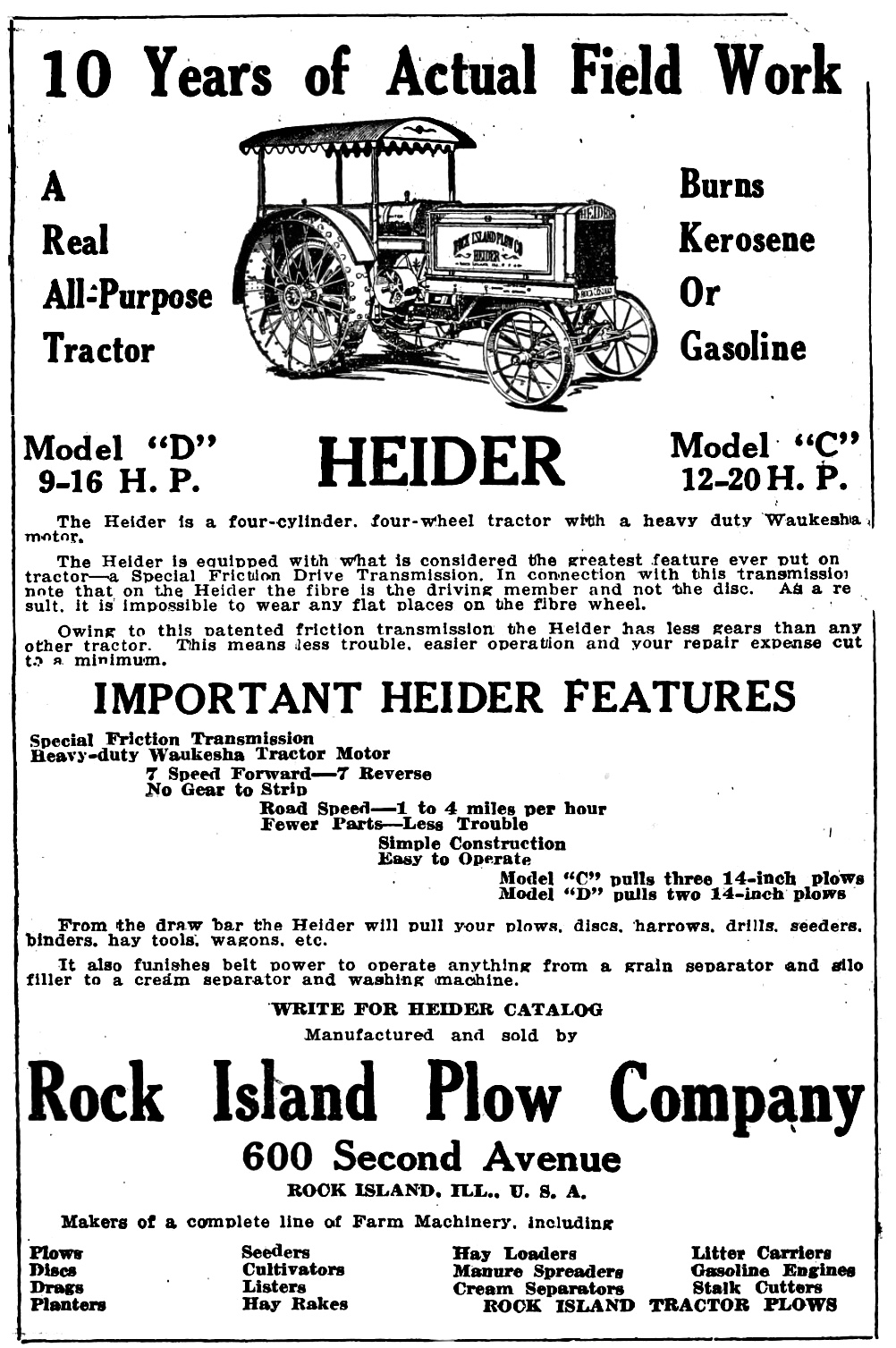
Heider tractor (1918)

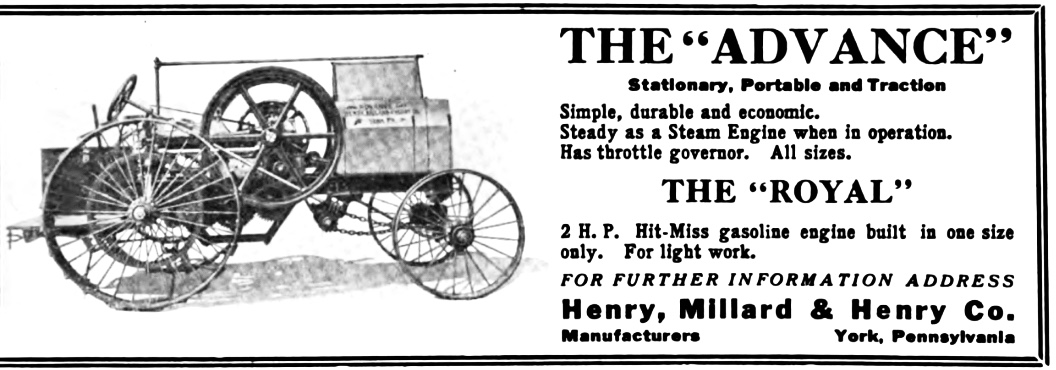
Henry, Millard & Henry Co. (1911-1914)

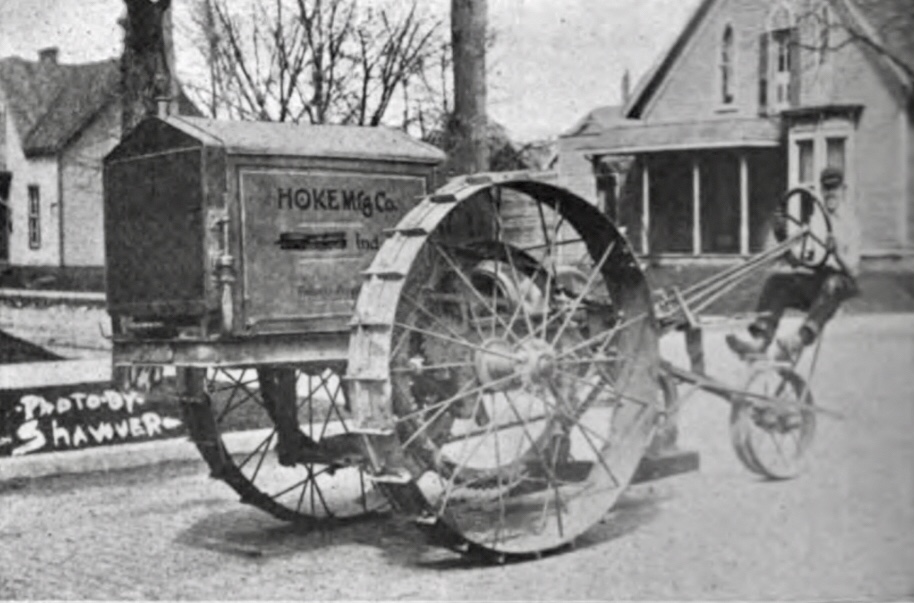
Hoke (1912-1917)

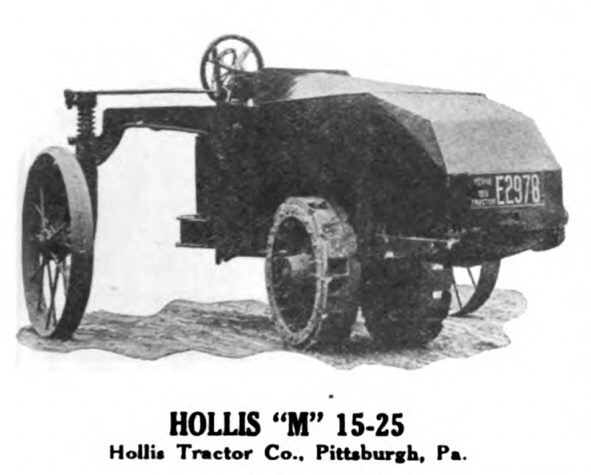
Hollis Model M 15-25

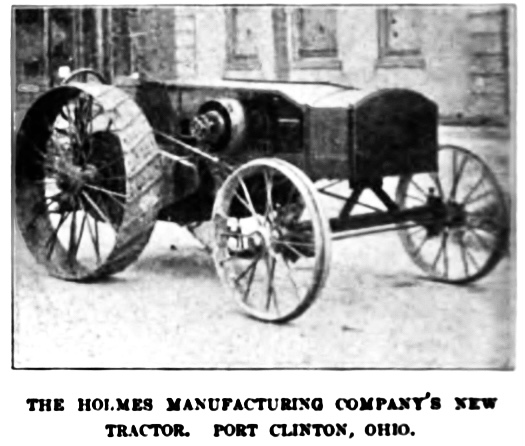
Holmes (1912-1914)

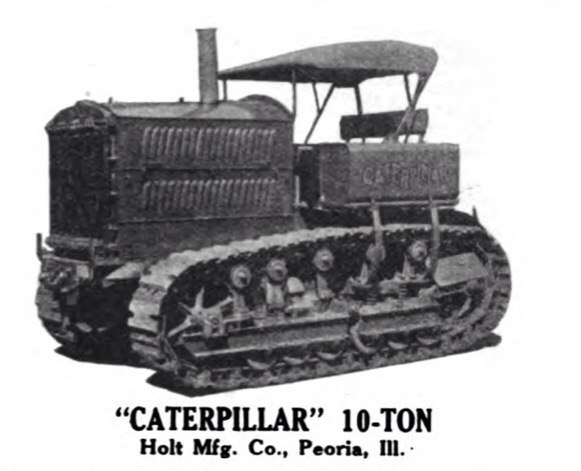
Holt Caterpillar 10 t

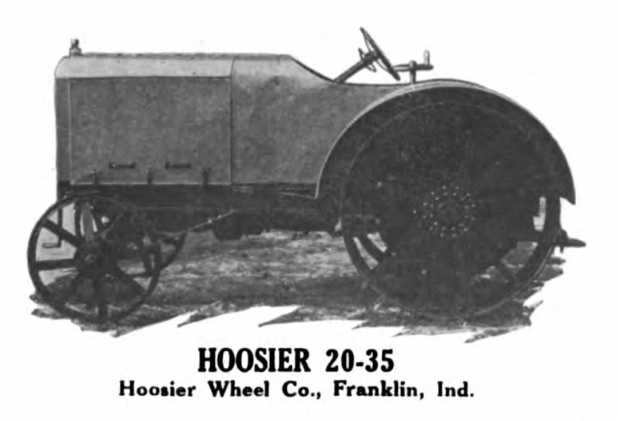
Hoosier 20-35

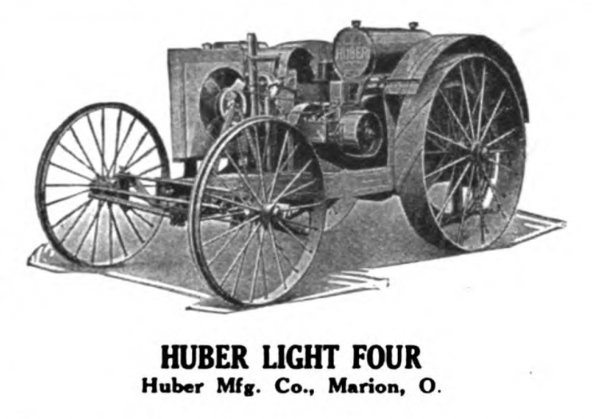
Huber Light Four

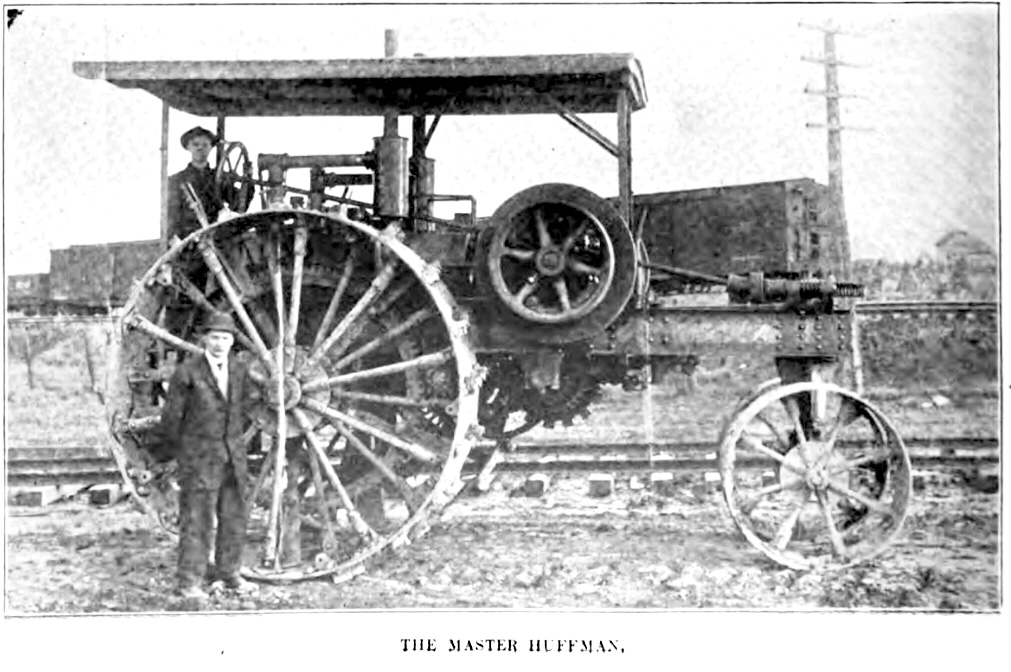
Huffman (1913)

- Haas (USA)
- Hackney (USA)
- Hagan (USA)
- Hagerstown Steam Engine (USA) steam tractor
- Hahn-Eclipse (USA)
- Hanomag (Germany)
- Hanomag-Barreiros (Spain)
- Hanzi (China)
- Happy Farmer (USA)
- Harrison Machine Works (Belleville, Illinois, USA)
- Hart-Parr (USA) – merged into the Oliver Farm Equipment Company in 1929; purchased by Oliver Corporation
- Hattat Agricultural Engines (Turkey)
- Hatz (Germany)
- Heer Engine Company (USA)Heer
- Hefty (USA)
- Heider (USA) Heider
- Heilman Machine Works (USA) steam tractor
- Heinze (USA)
- HELA (Germany) HELA
- HEMOS
- Henneuse (USA)
- Henry, Millard & Henry Co. (USA)
- Herriau
- Hession (USA)
- Hesston (USA) – tractors were part of Fiat; hay equipment and name purchased by AGCO
- Highlander (England, UK) – specialist forestry conversions
- Hindustan (India) – now MGTL
- Hinomoto (Japan) – Relaunched in 2019 by Sotrac ( Portugal - EU )
- Hitachi (Japan)
- Hittner (Croatia)
- HMT (India)
- Hofherr HSCS (Germany)
- Hofherr-Schrantz (Austro-Hungarian)
- Hoke (USA)
- Holder GmbH (Germany)
- Hollis (USA)
- Holmes (USA) Danville Foundry and Machine Company
- Holt Manufacturing Company (USA) – merged with Best to form the Caterpillar Tractor Company
- Homesteader (USA) – Clinton, AR – garden tractors
- Homier Farm-Pro (USA)
- Honda (Japan)
- Hoosier (USA)
- Hoover, Owens and Rentscheler (USA) steam tractor
- Richard Hornsby & Sons (England, UK)
- Horwood Bagshaw (Australia)
- Howard (Australia) – tractor, rotavators and rotary tillers
- Howard Farmers (England, UK)
- HOYO (Romania) – assemble Tai Shan
- HSCS (Austria/Hungary)
- Huber (USA)
- Huffman (USA)
- Hume (USA)
- Hürlimann (Switzerland) Hürlimann
- Hydratiller (USA)
- Hyundai (South Korea)

== I ==
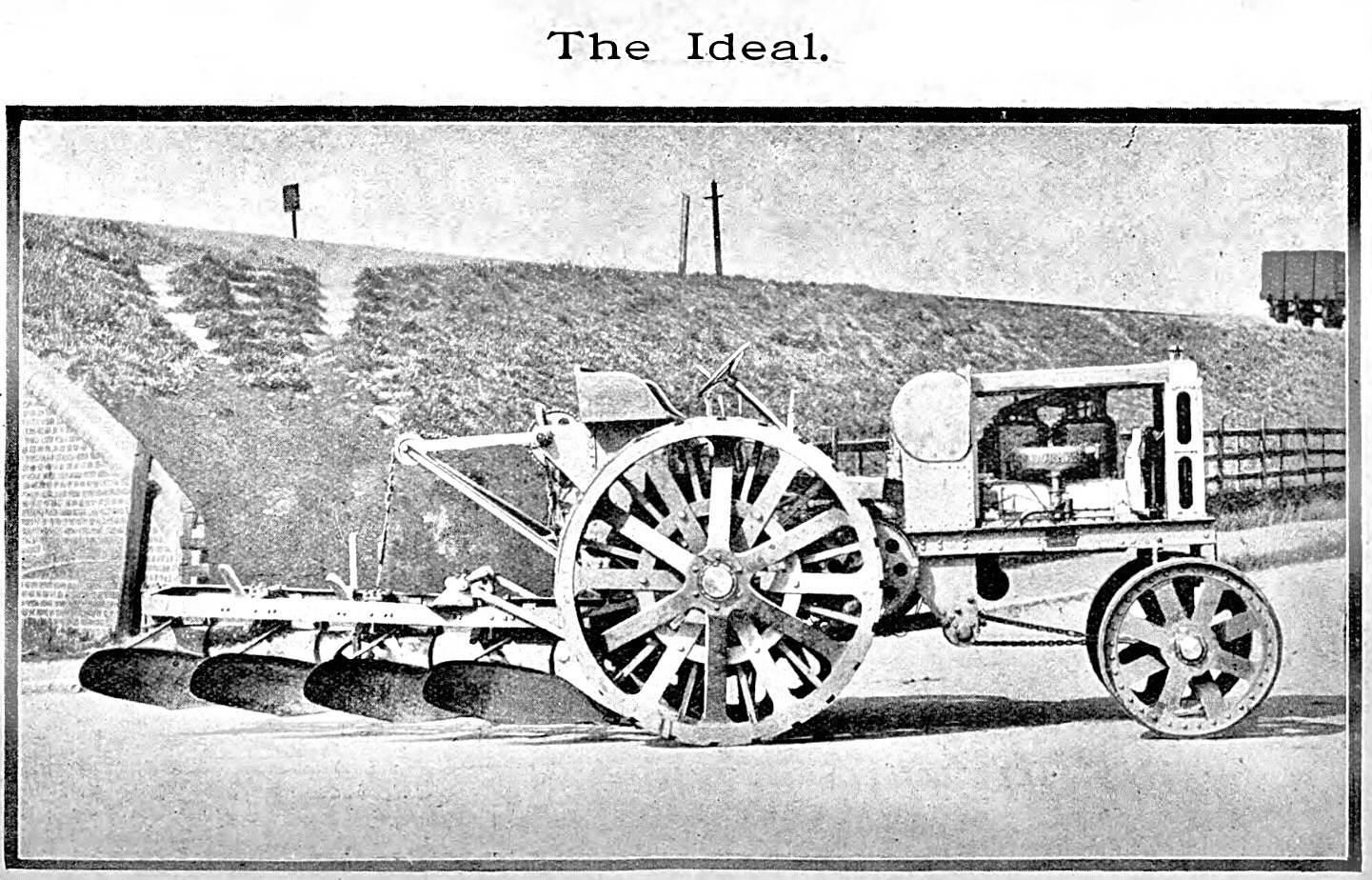
Ideal 35 hp (1917)

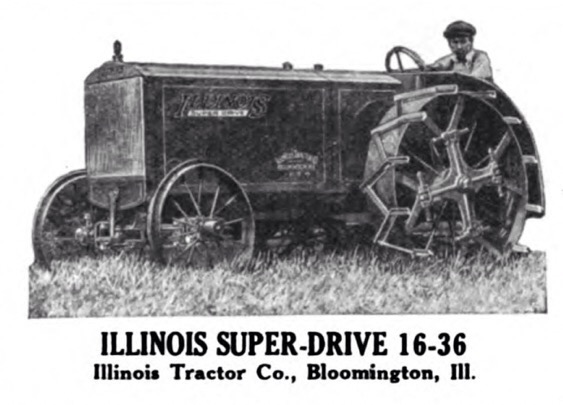
Illinois Super-Drive 16-36

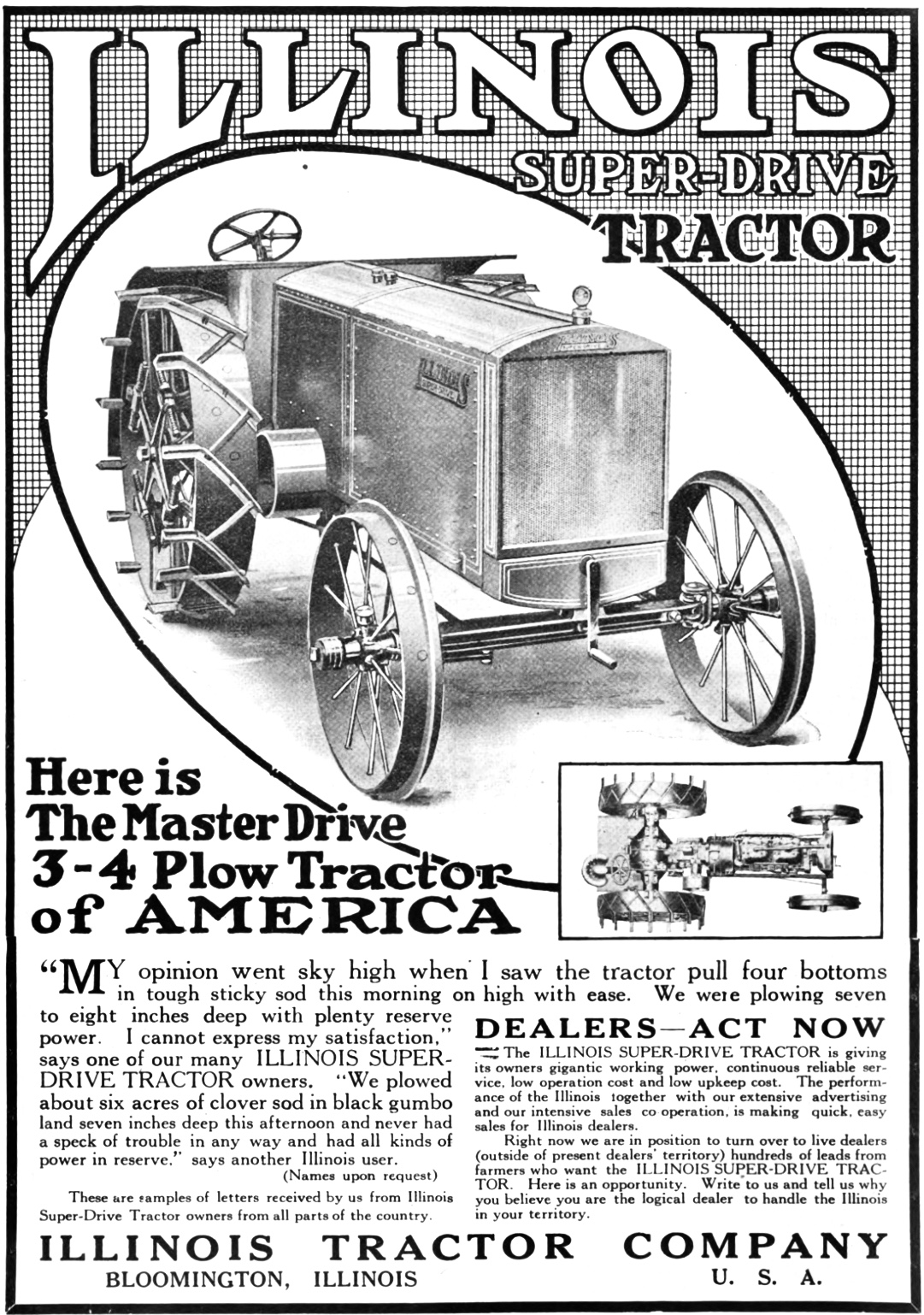
Illinois advertisement (1919)

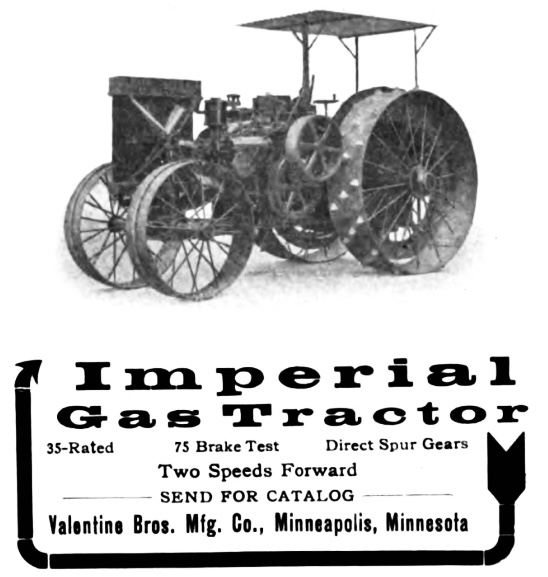
Imperial - Valentine (1902-1922)

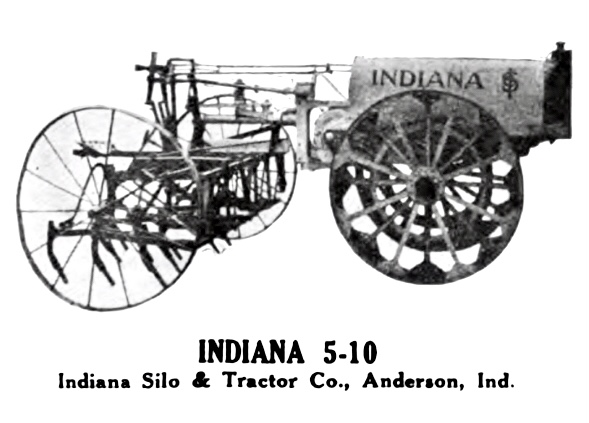
Indiana 5-10

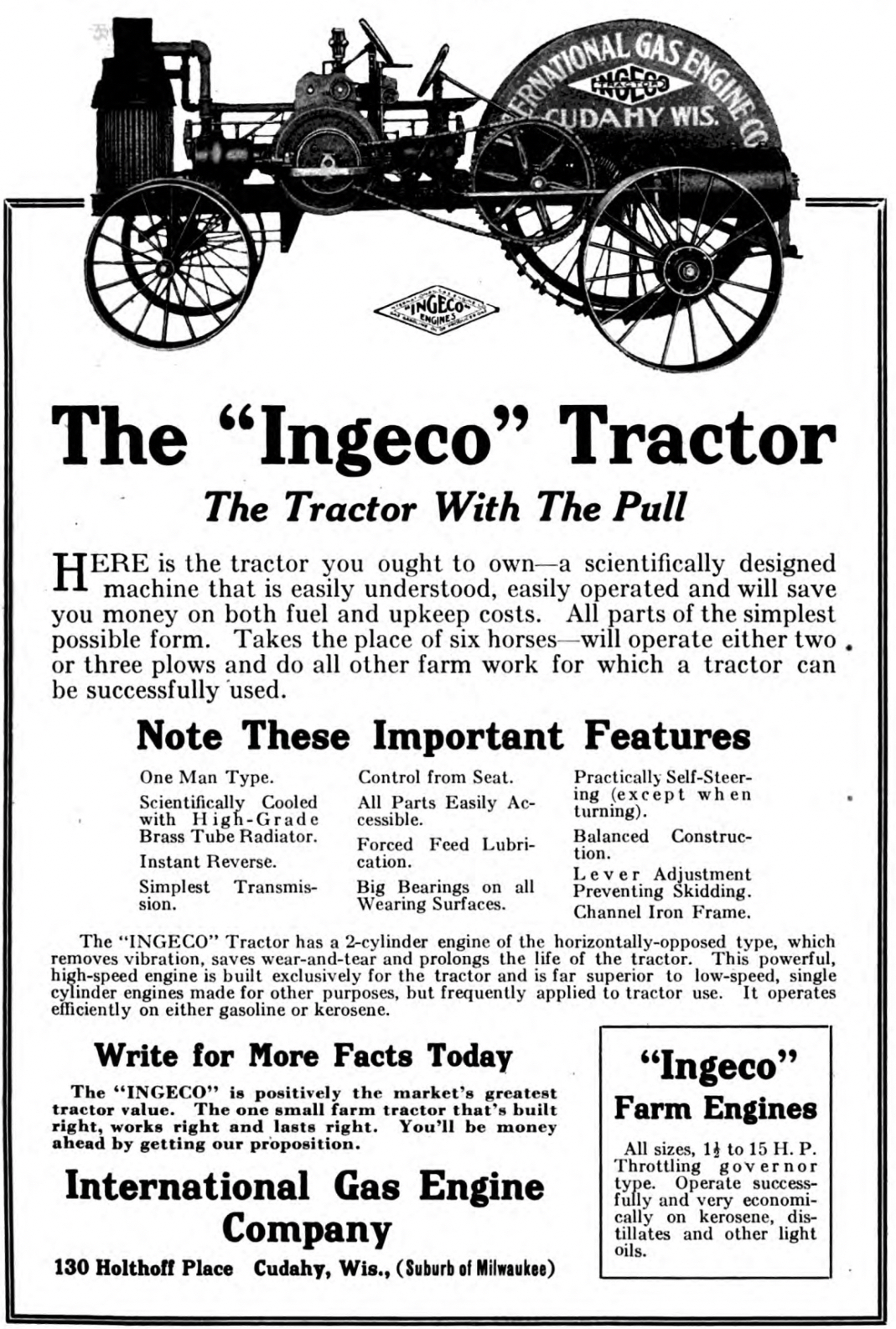
International Gas Engine Ingeco (1915-1919)

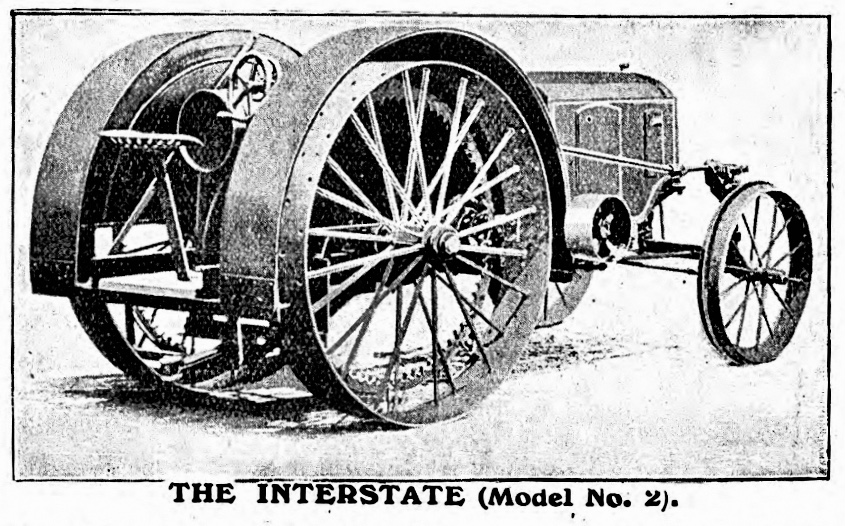
Interstate Model 2 (1918)

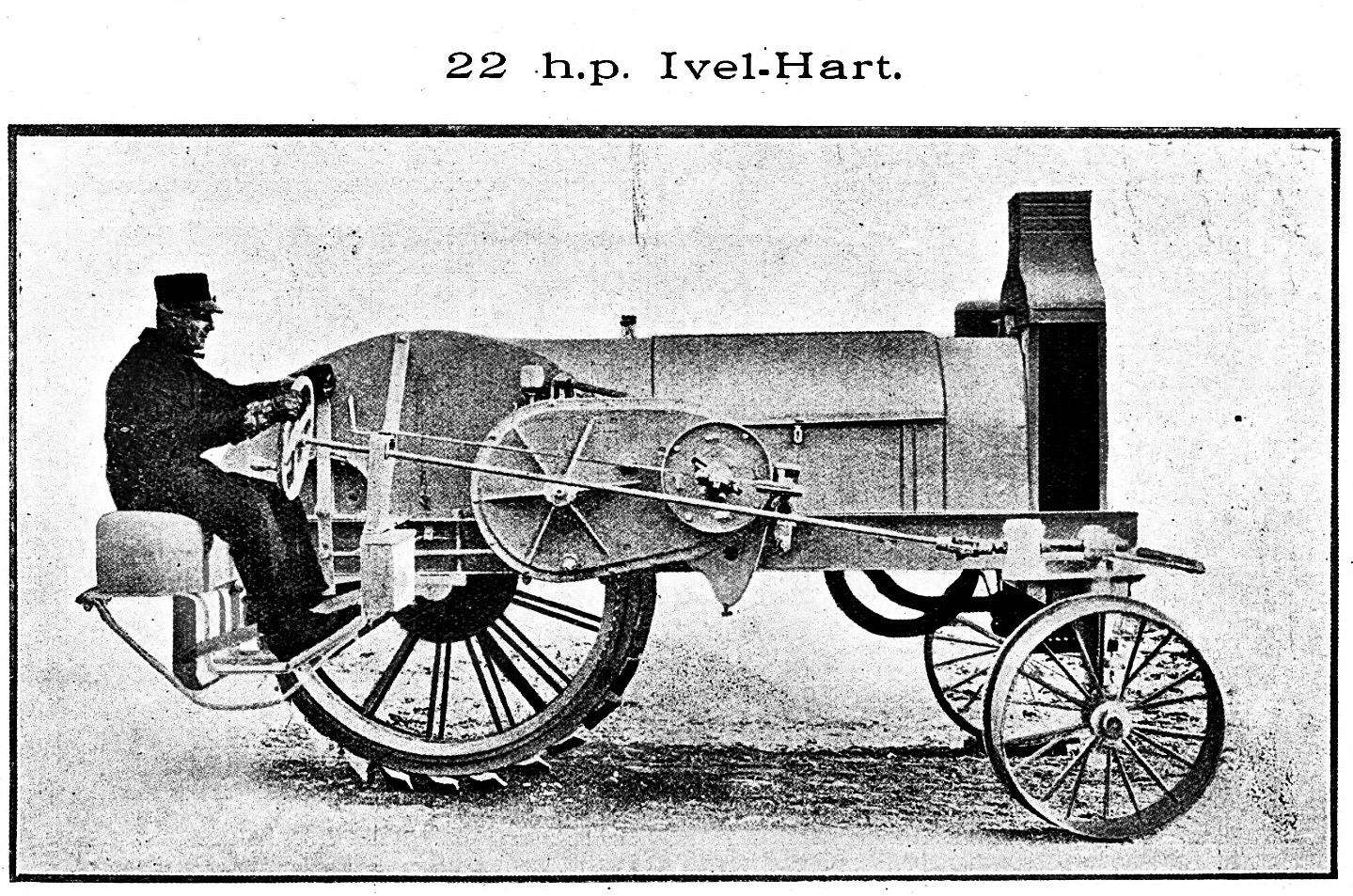
Ivel-Hart 22 hp (1913-1917)

- IAR (Romania)
- Ideal (England, UK)
- IFA (Germany)
- Illinois (USA)
- Illinois Thresher (USA) steam tractor
- IMA (Argentina)
- Imor (Brazil)
- Imperial Machine Co. – previous Valentine established 1902 (Minnesota, USA)
- Imperial (Australia)
- Imperial Super Drive (Canada)
- Independent Harvester (USA)
- Indiana (USA)
- Indo Farm (India)
- Ingersoll Power Equipment USA
- Industrija Motora Rakovica (IMR) (Serbia)
- Intercontinental (USA)
- International Gas Engine (USA)
- International Harvester (Australia)
- International Harvester (USA) – agriculture division sold to Tenneco and merged with Case to form Case IH in 1985
- International TOE (Turkey) – licensed IH
- Interstate tractor (USA)
- Is Bora (Turkey) – Shibauara
- Ishikawajima-Harima (Japan) – now Shibaura
- Isoto (Turkey) – license Tuber
- Issoise (France)
- ITC (USA)
- Ivel (England, UK) – invented by Dan Albone
- Ivel (USA) - rights acquired by G.M. Weeks from Ivel (England, UK)

== J ==
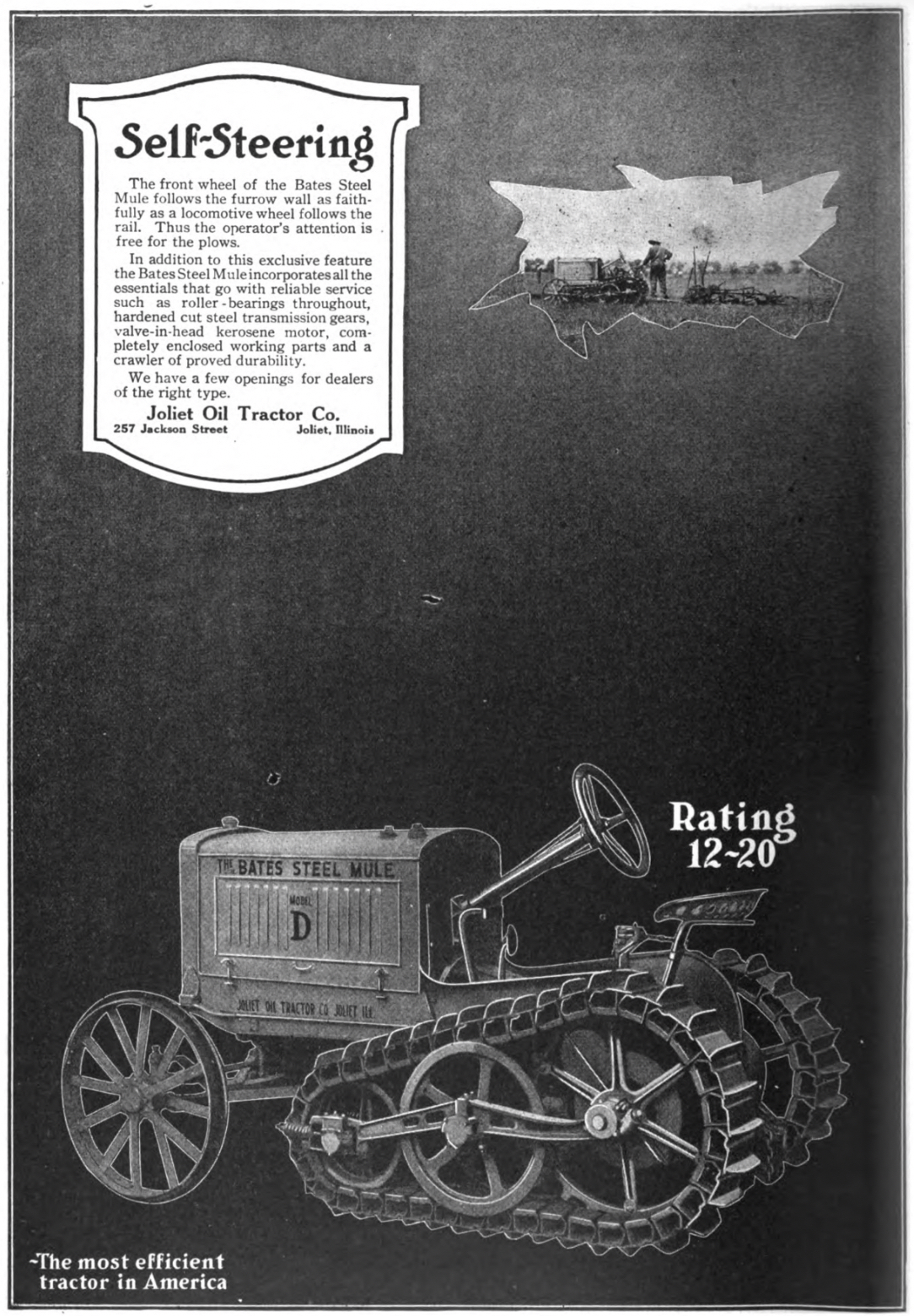
Bates Steel Mule 12-20 Joliet Oil Tractor

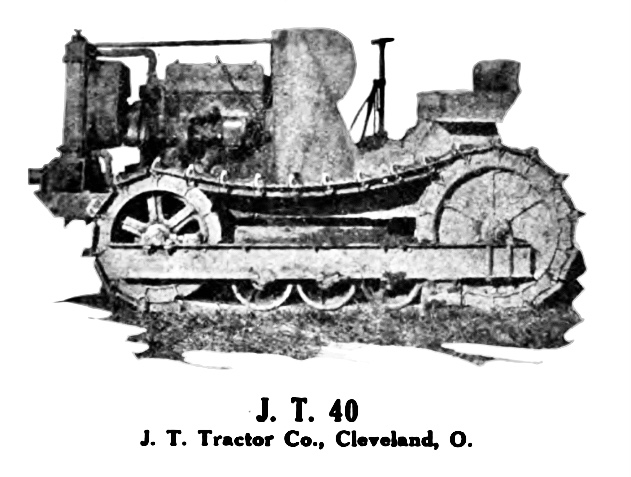
J.T. 40

- J & H Howard
- Jackson (USA)
- JDS (Germany)
  - Eicher
    - Valtra Eicher
- Jeep (USA)
- Jela
- Jelbart (Australia)
- Jiangling (China)
- John Blue (USA)
- John Deere Hattat (Turkey)
- John Deere Lanz (Germany) – formerly Heinrich Lanz AG, originally Heinrich Lanz Company
- John Goodison Thresher (USA) steam tractor
- Johnston (Sweden / France)
- Joliet (USA)
- J.T. Tractor (USA)
- Juling (China)
- Jumbo (USA)
- June (Sweden)
- D. June and Co. (USA) steam tractor
- JWD (United Kingdom)

== K ==
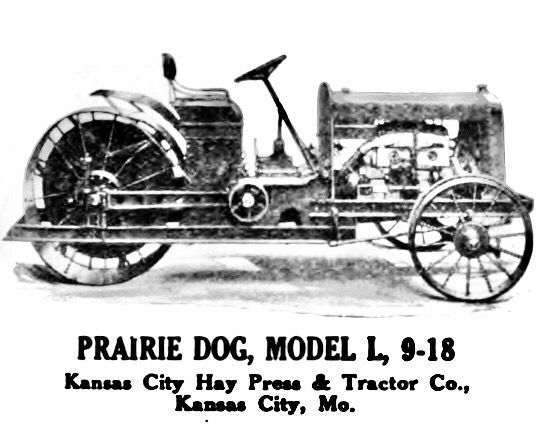
Kansas City Hay Press & Tractor Co. Prairie Dog, Model L 9-18

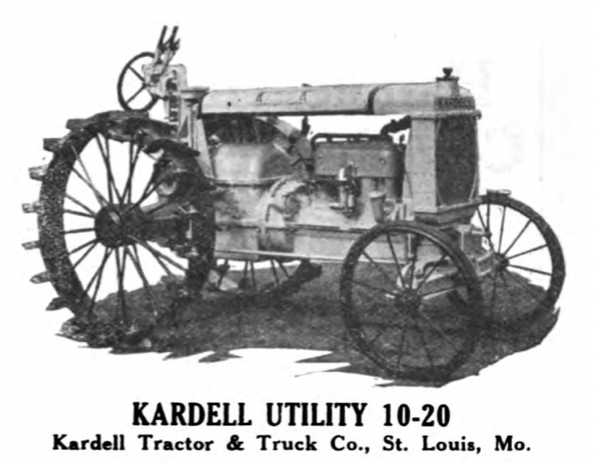
Kardell Utility 10-20

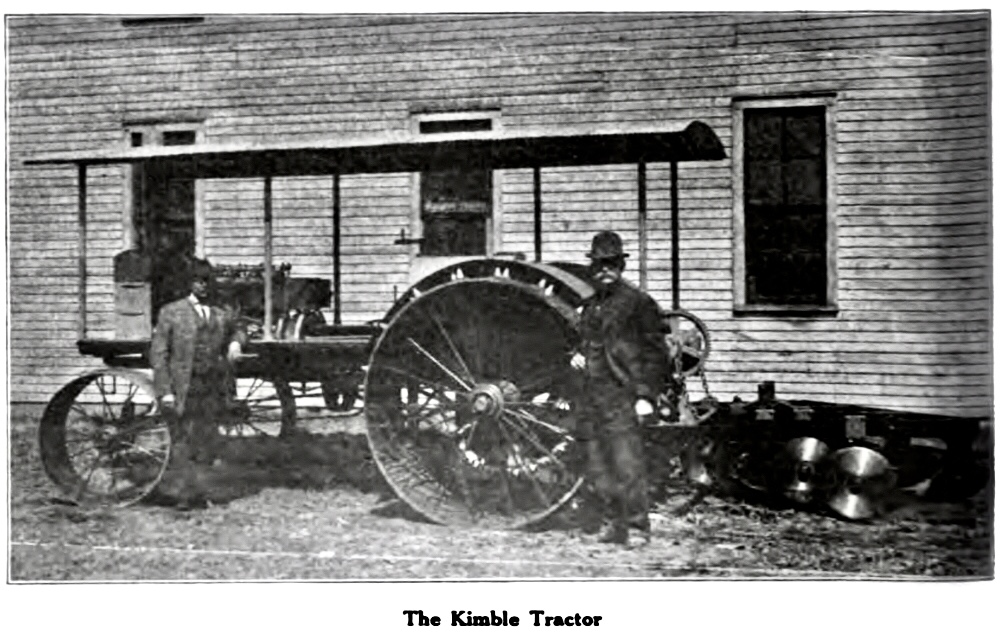
Kimble (1913)

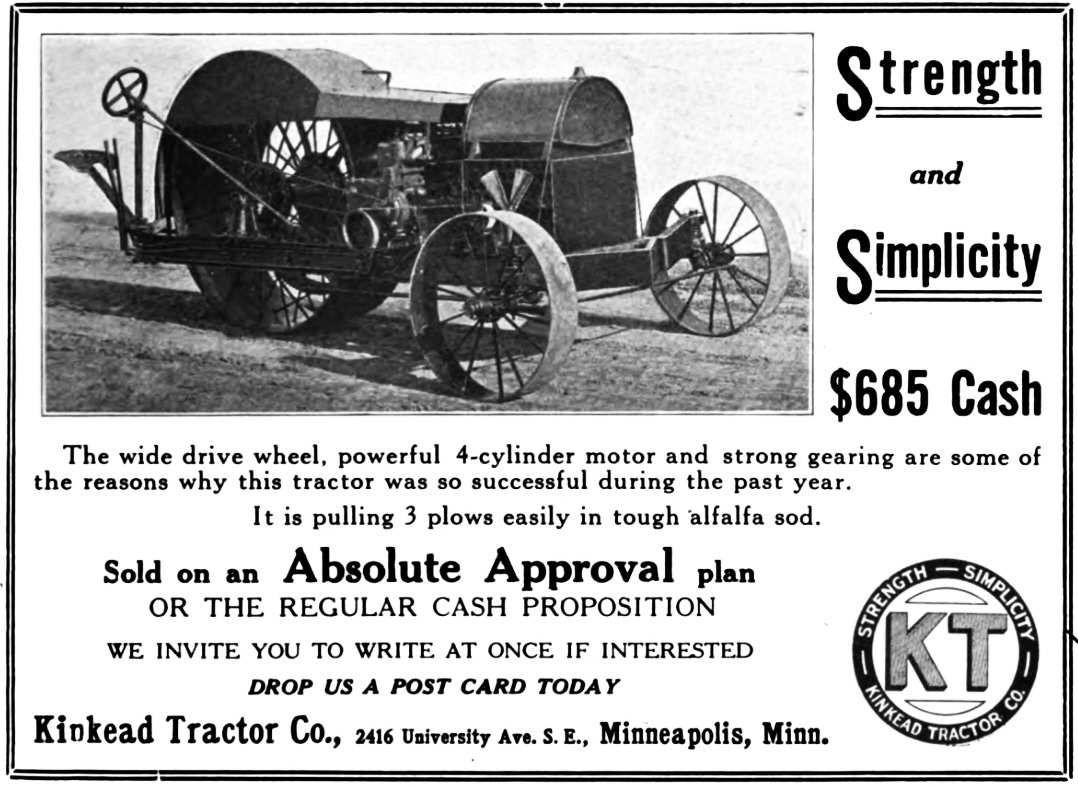
Kinkead (1915-1917)

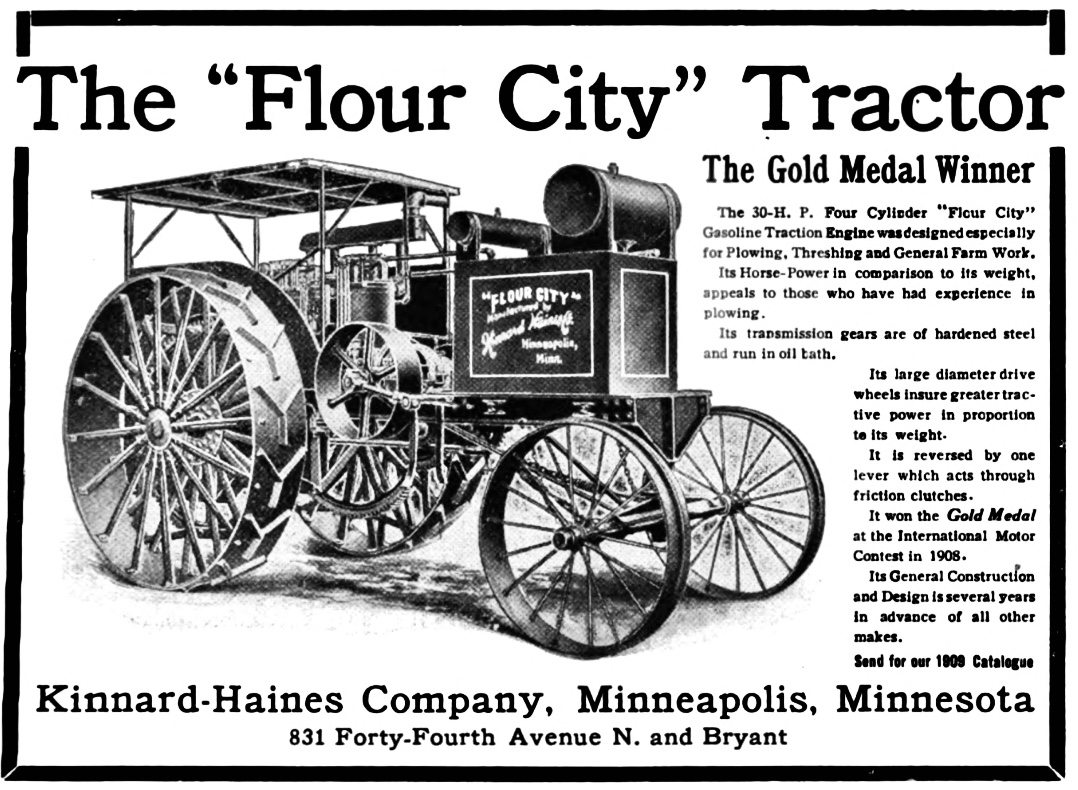
Kinnard-Haynes Flour City 30 hp (1908-1910)

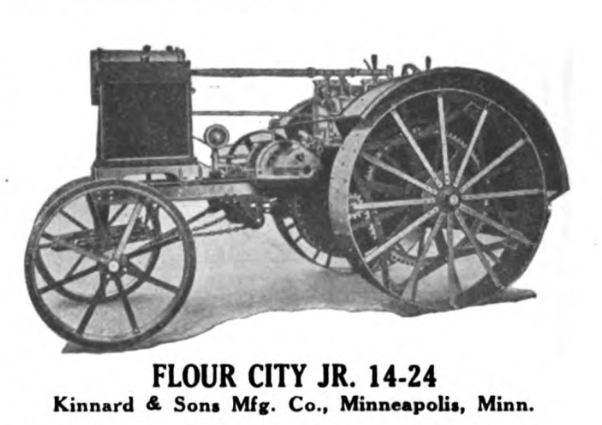
Kinnard & Sons Flour City Jr. 14-24

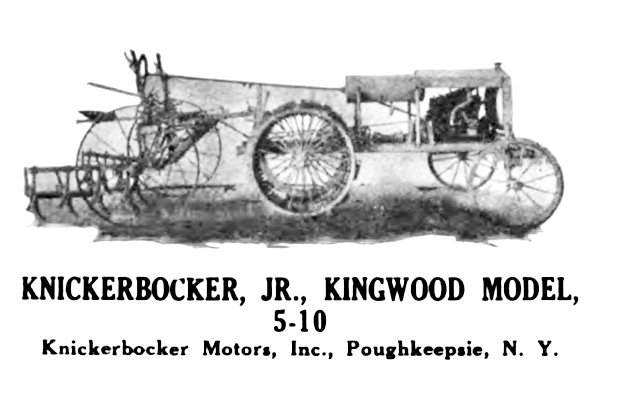
Knickerbocker Kingwood Model 5-10

- Kaelble (Germany)
- Kansas City Hay Press Co. (USA)
- Kardell (USA)
- Karl Blank (Germany)
- KBZ (Russia)
- Keck-Gonnerman Co. (USA)
- Kelkel (Germany)
- Kelley O.S. (USA) steam tractor
- Kelly & Lewis (Australia)
- Kelpie (England, UK)
- Kemna
- Kenney-Colwell (USA)
- KHD (Austria)
- Killen-Strait (USA)
- Kimble (USA)
- Kínai
- Kinkead (USA)
- Kinnard & Sons (USA) - successor Kinnard-Haynes
- Kirloskar (India)
- Kirov Plant (Russia)
- Kirschmann (USA)
- Kitten (USA)
- Kiva (France)
- Knudson (USA)
- Kodiak (USA)
- Kögel (Germany) Kögel
- Kolomenec (Russia)
- Komatsu (Japan)
- Komatsu International (Japan)
- Kommunar (USSR)
- Komnick (Germany)
- Koni
- Köpfli (Switzerland)
- Koyker
- Kramer (Germany) – merged with Neuson, who then merged with Wacker AG
- Krasser (Austria)
- KTMCO (Iran / Kurdistan) – subsidiary of ITMCO
- Kuhnhausen (Germany)
- Kullervo (Finland)
- Kullmo (Sweden)
- Kulmus (Germany) Kulmus
- Kumiai (Japan)
- Kunow (USA)
- Kunz (Switzerland)
- Krümpel (Germany) Krümpel

== L ==
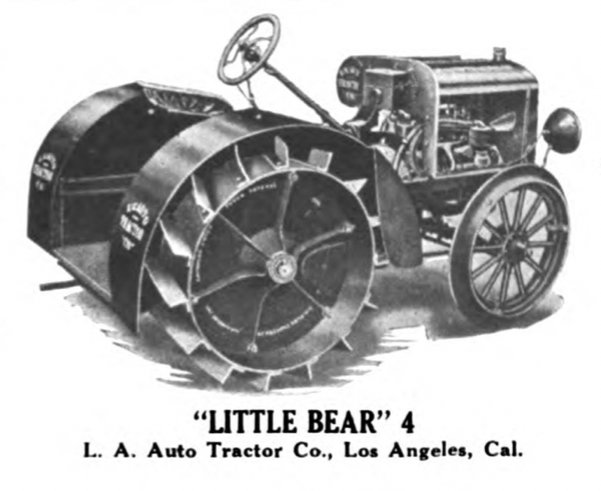
L.A. Auto Tractor Co. „ Little Bear“ 4

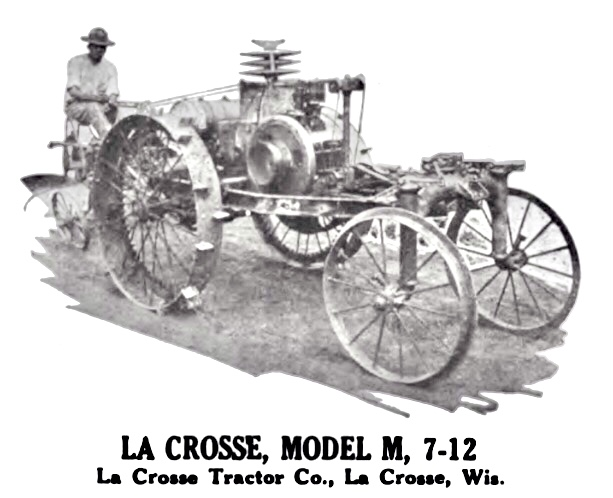
La Crosse Model M 7-12

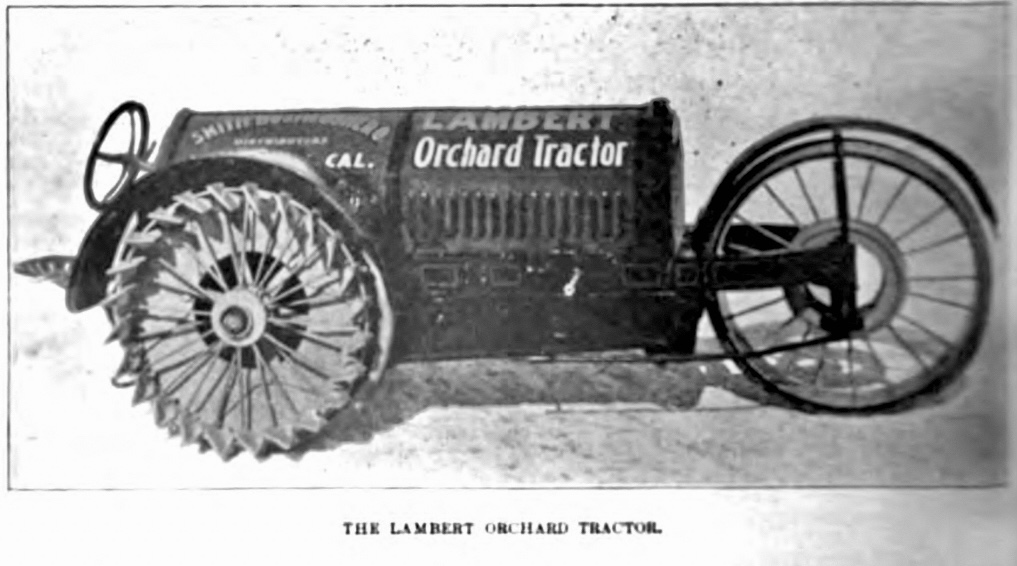
Lambert Orchard (1912-1916)

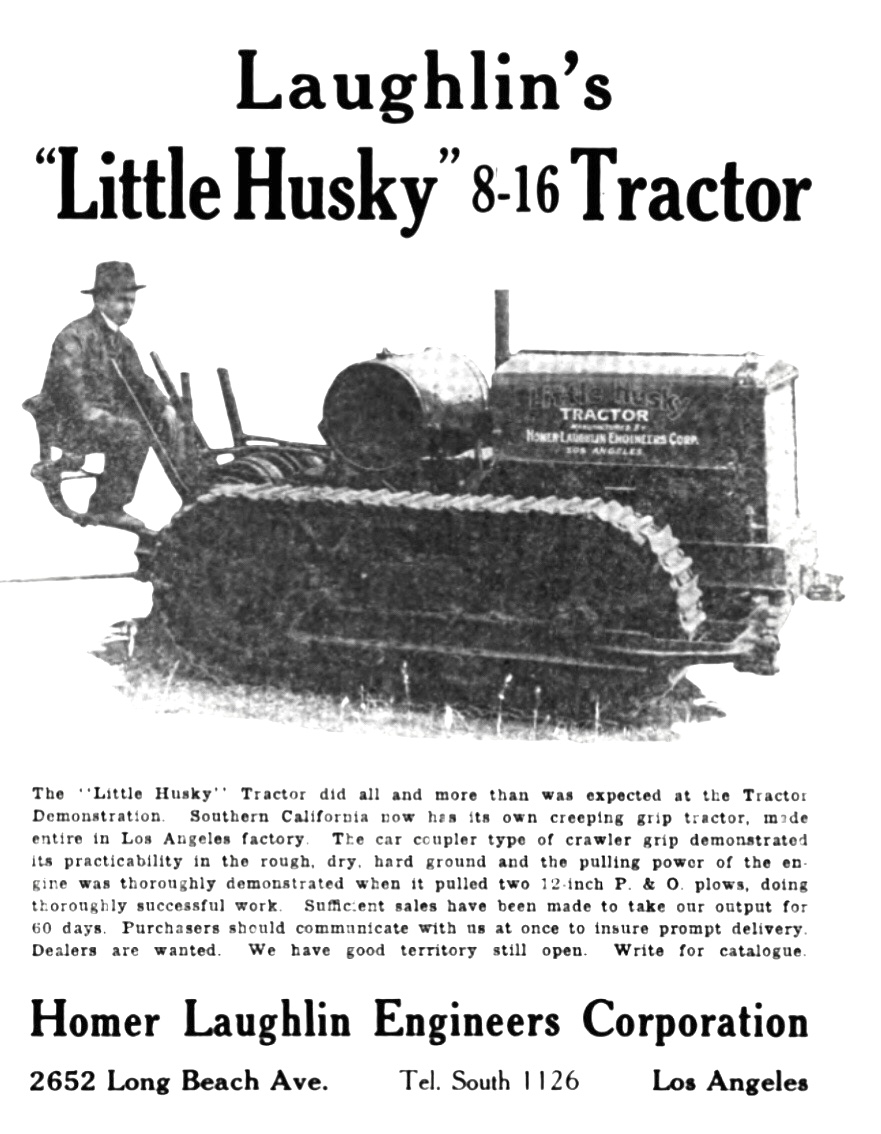
Laughlin 8-16 (1918-1919)

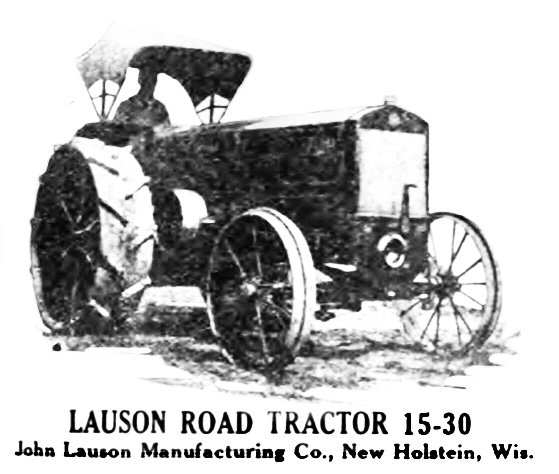
Lauson Road Tractor 15-30

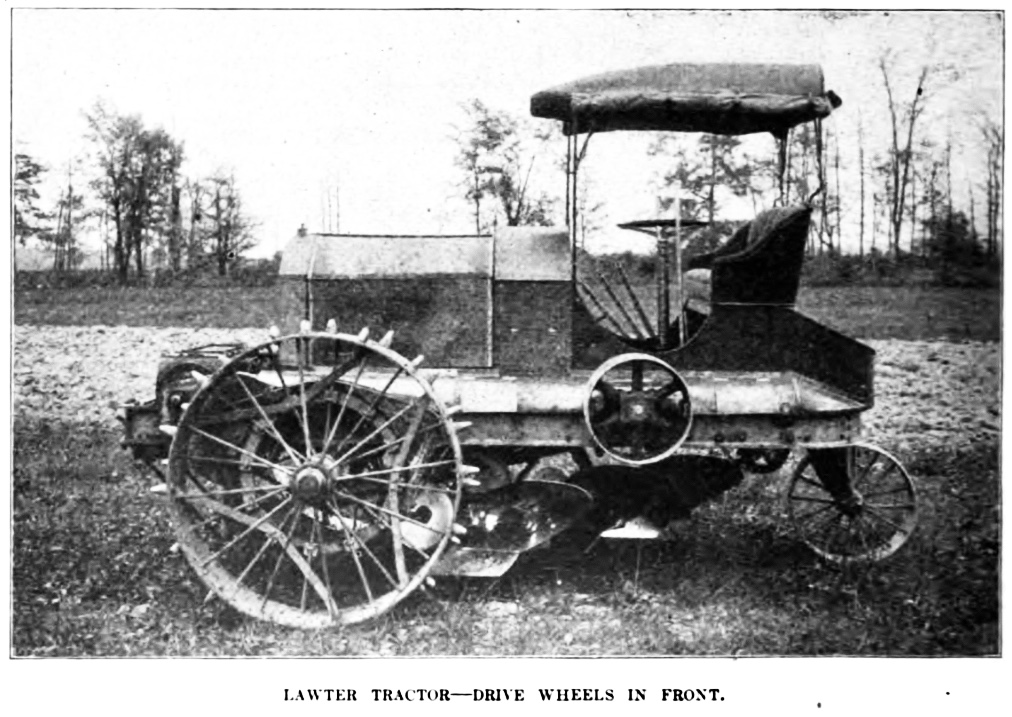
Lawter (1913-1918)

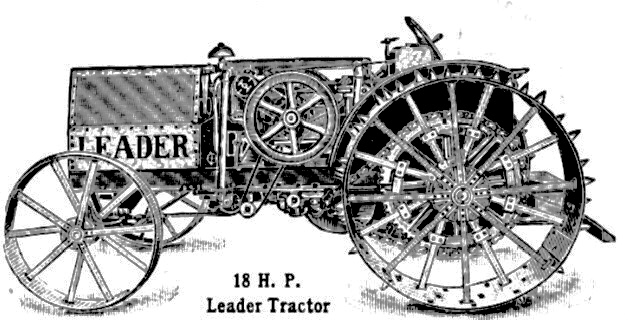
Leader (1913) 18 hp

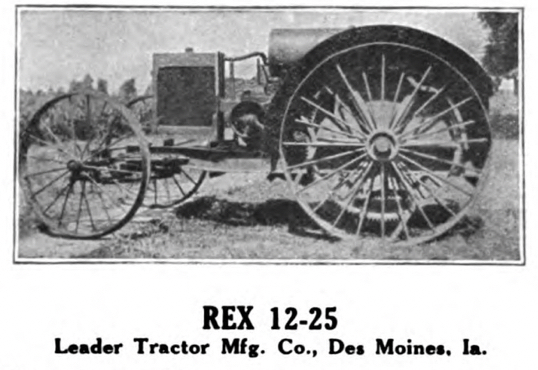
Leader Tractor Rex 12-25

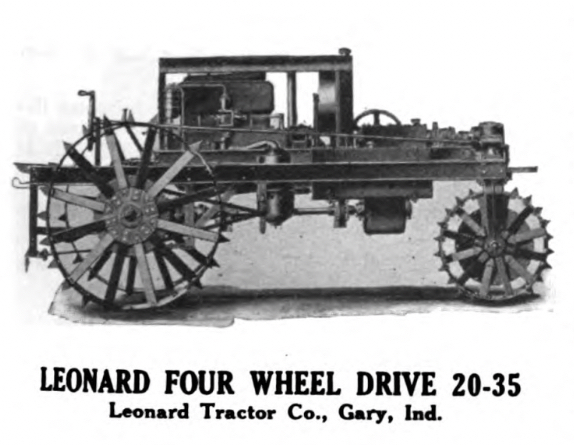
Leonard Four Wheel Drive 20-35

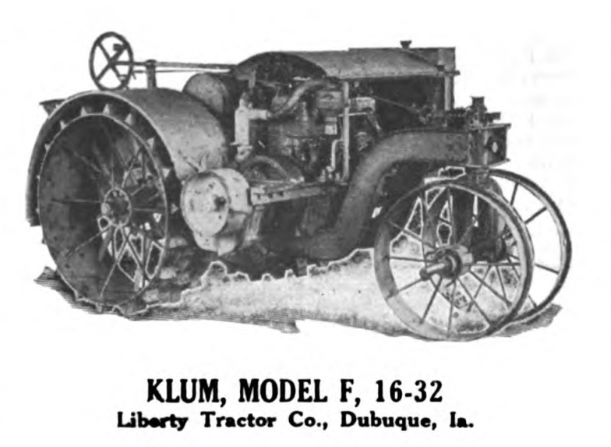
Liberty Tractor Klum Model F 16-32

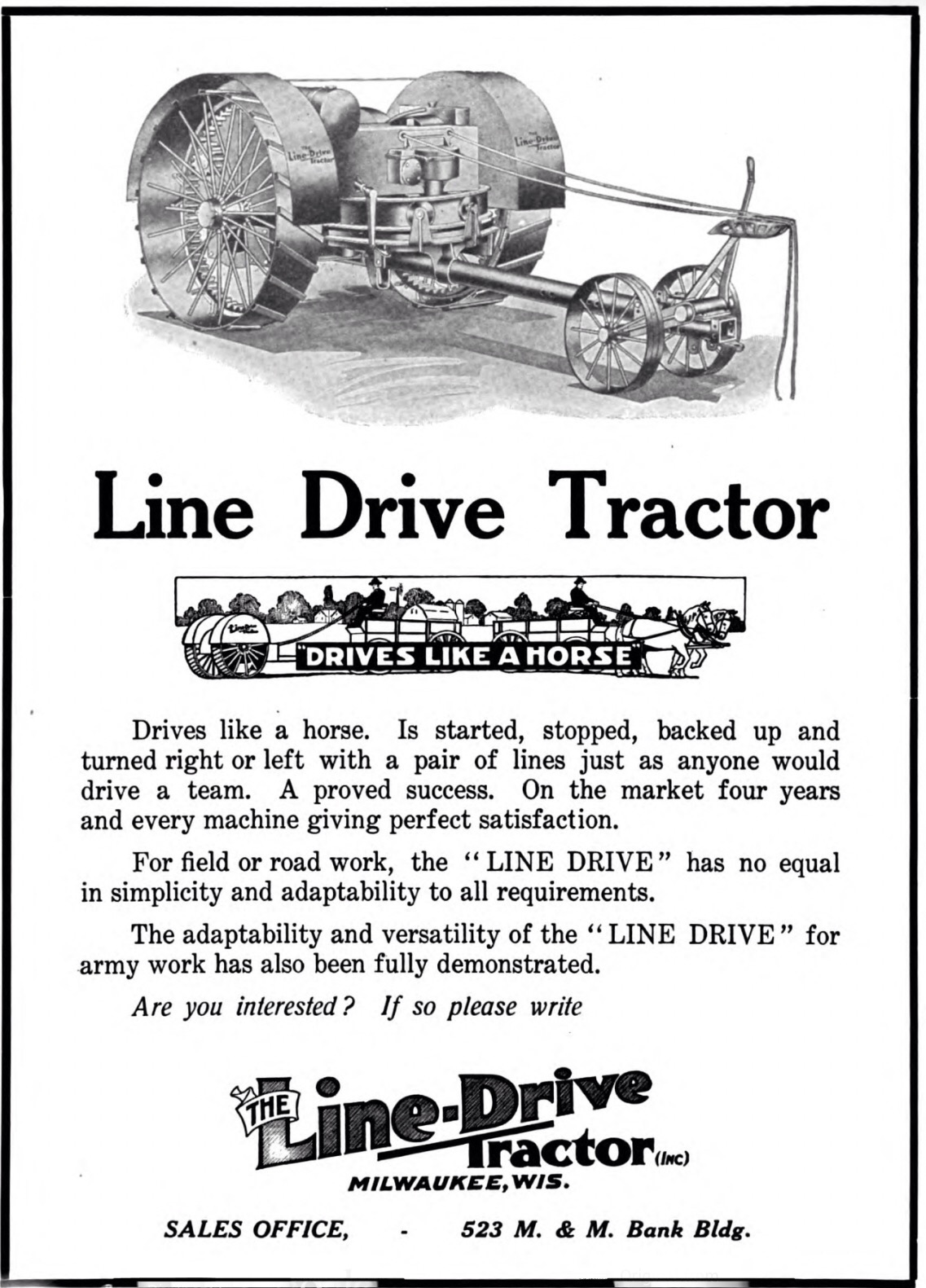
Line Drive Tractor (1917)

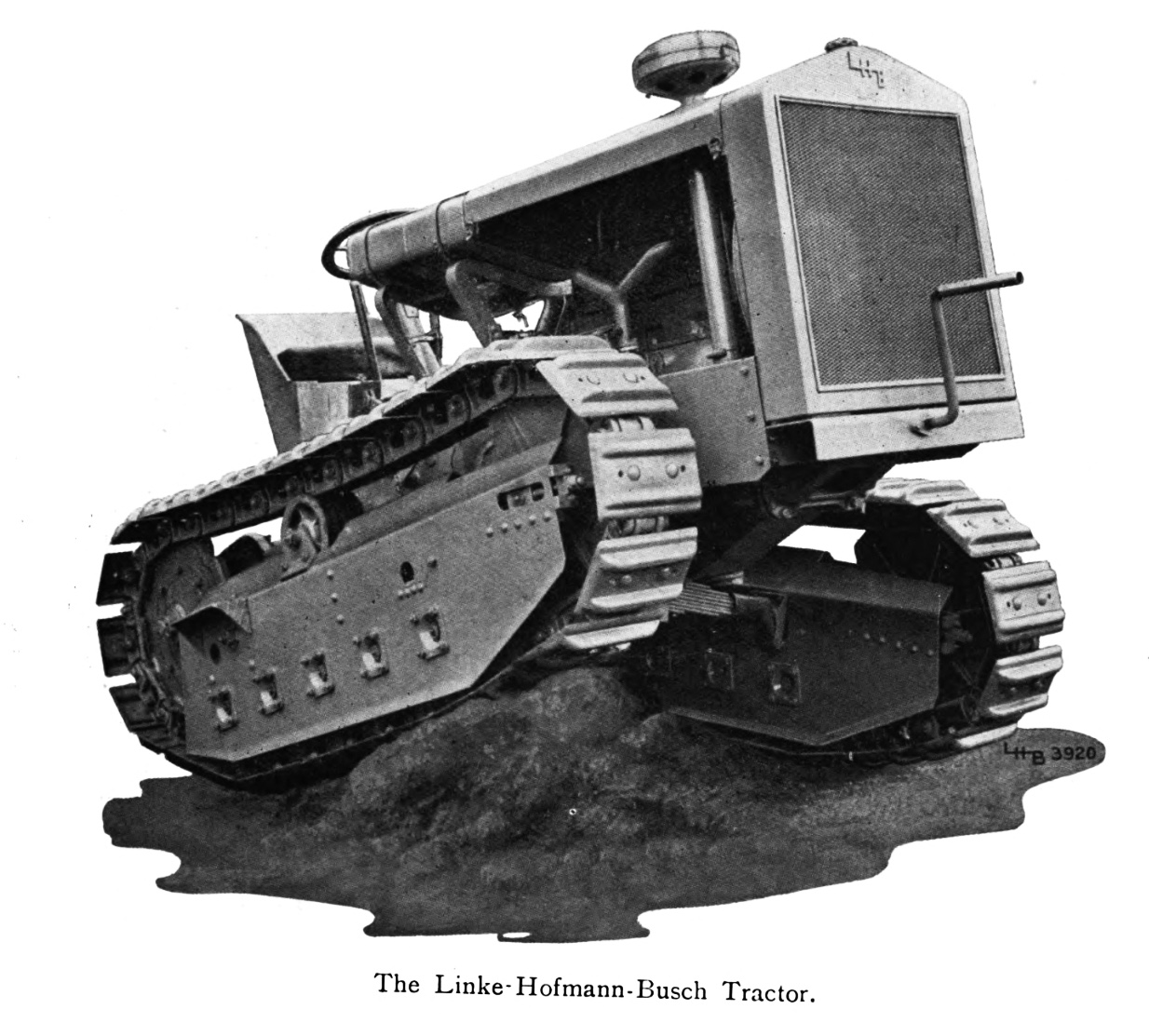
Linke-Hofmann-Busch „Rübezahl“ 35-45 (1926-1935)

- L&T – John Deere (India) – joint venture, bought out by Deere & Company
- Labourier (France)
- L.A. Auto Tractor (USA)
- LaCrosse (USA)
- L'Agro (France)
- Lambert Orchard (USA)
- Lamborghini (Italy) — Lamborghini Trattori tractors were the original product of the current Lamborghini sports car company
- Land and Button (USA) steam tractor
- Landhope (Japan) – by Iseki
- Landleader (Japan) – by Iseki
- Lansing Iron & Engine Works (USA) steam tractor
- Lanskrona (Sweden)
- Lanson (USA)
- Landrin (France)
- LandTrac (USA) – by Long
- LANZ (Germany) – original brand name of Heinrich Lanz AG, bought out in 1956 by John Deere owner Deere & Company
- Lanz Iberica (Spain) Lanz Iberica
- Latil (France)
- Lauer (Germany?)
- Laughlin (USA)
- Lauson (USA)
- Lawter (USA)
- Leader Engine Company (USA)
- Leader Tractor Company (USA)
- Legras (France)
- Lehr's Big Boy (USA)
- Lely Multipower (USA)
- Lely (The Netherlands)
- Lenar
- Lenox (USA)
- Leo Rumely (USA)
- Le Percheron (France)
- Le Pratique (France)
- Le Robuste (France)
- LeRoi (USA)
- Letourneur & Marchand (France)
- LESA (Italy)
- LeTourneau (USA)
- Lefebvre (France)
- Leyland (England, UK) – later Marshall
- LG (South Korea) – now LS
- LG-Fiat (South Korea) – now LS-New Holland
- LG Montana (USA) – now Montana
- LG-New Holland (South Korea) – now LS-New Holland
- LHB (Germany)
- Liaz (Czech)
- Liberty (USA)
- Lightforce Deluxe
- Lightforce Tractore
- Line Drive Tractor (USA)
- Linke-Hofmann-Busch (Germany)
- Linn maker of the Linn tractor – Republic Motor Truck Company (USA)
- Lioness (England, UK)
- Lipezki Traktorny Sawod (Russia) Lipezki Traktorny Sawod
- Lister (England, UK)
- Li-Trac (Germany)
- Little Giant (USA)
- LMP Agrimotor (France)
- Loiseau (France)
- Loko-Mobil
- Long (USA)
- LongAgri (USA)
- Longpierre (France)
- Lopel (Italy)
- Lorraine Dietrich (France)
- LS Mtron (South Korea)
- LTS (Germany)
- Luoyang Fiat (China)
- LUX-TRAC (Luxembourg)
- Luzhong (China)

== M ==
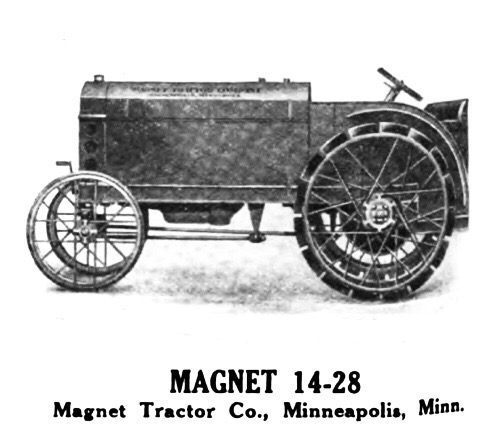
Magnet 14-28

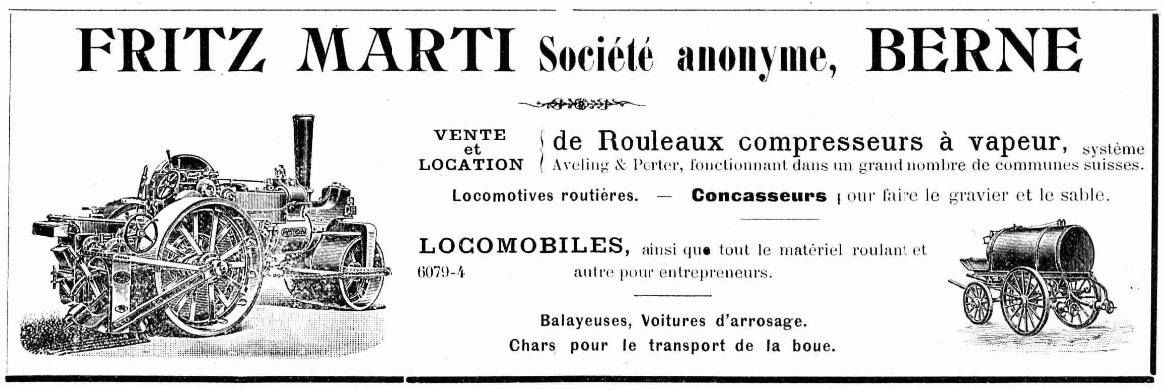
Fritz Marti (1914)

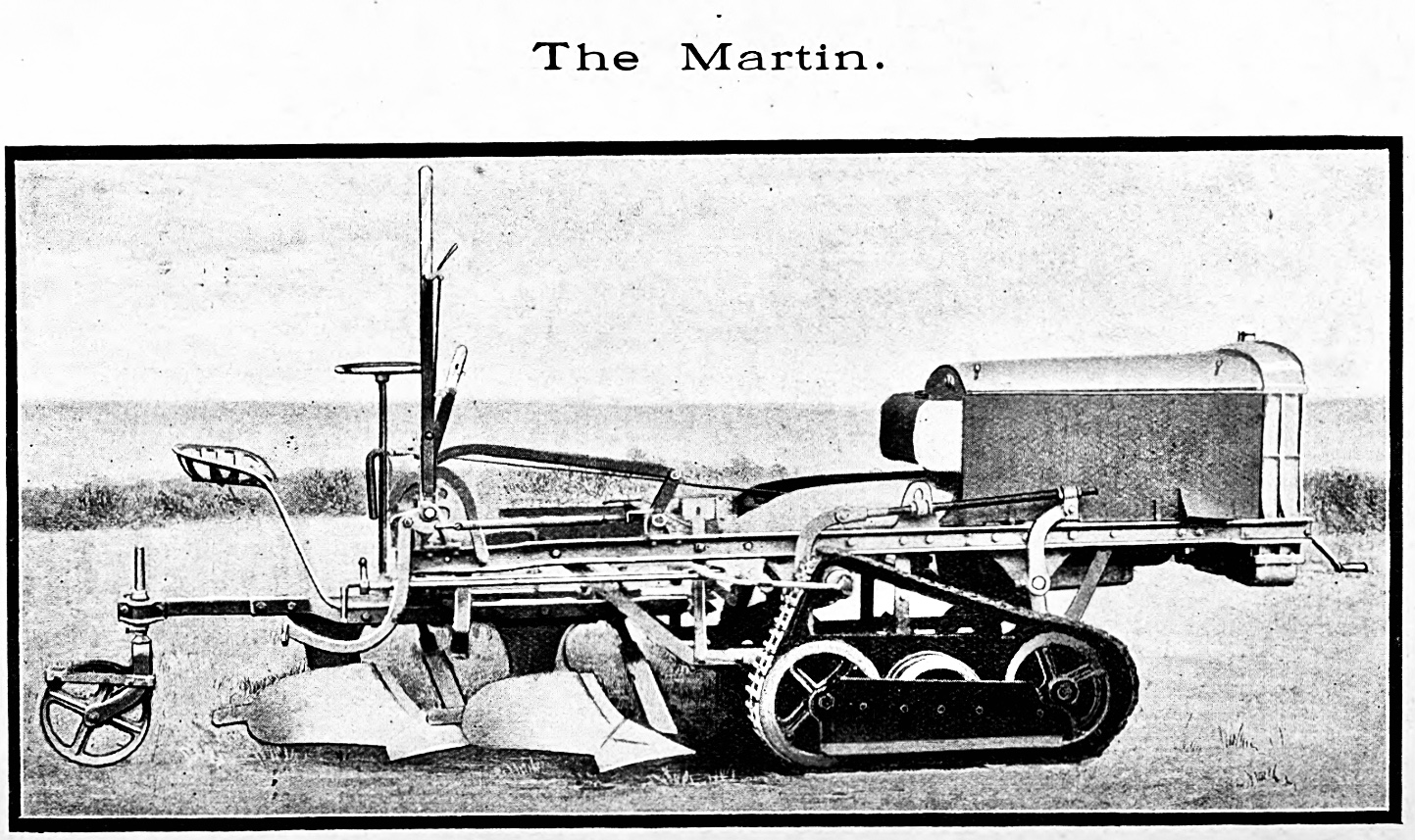
Martin's Motor Plough 25-30 (1915-ca. 1921)

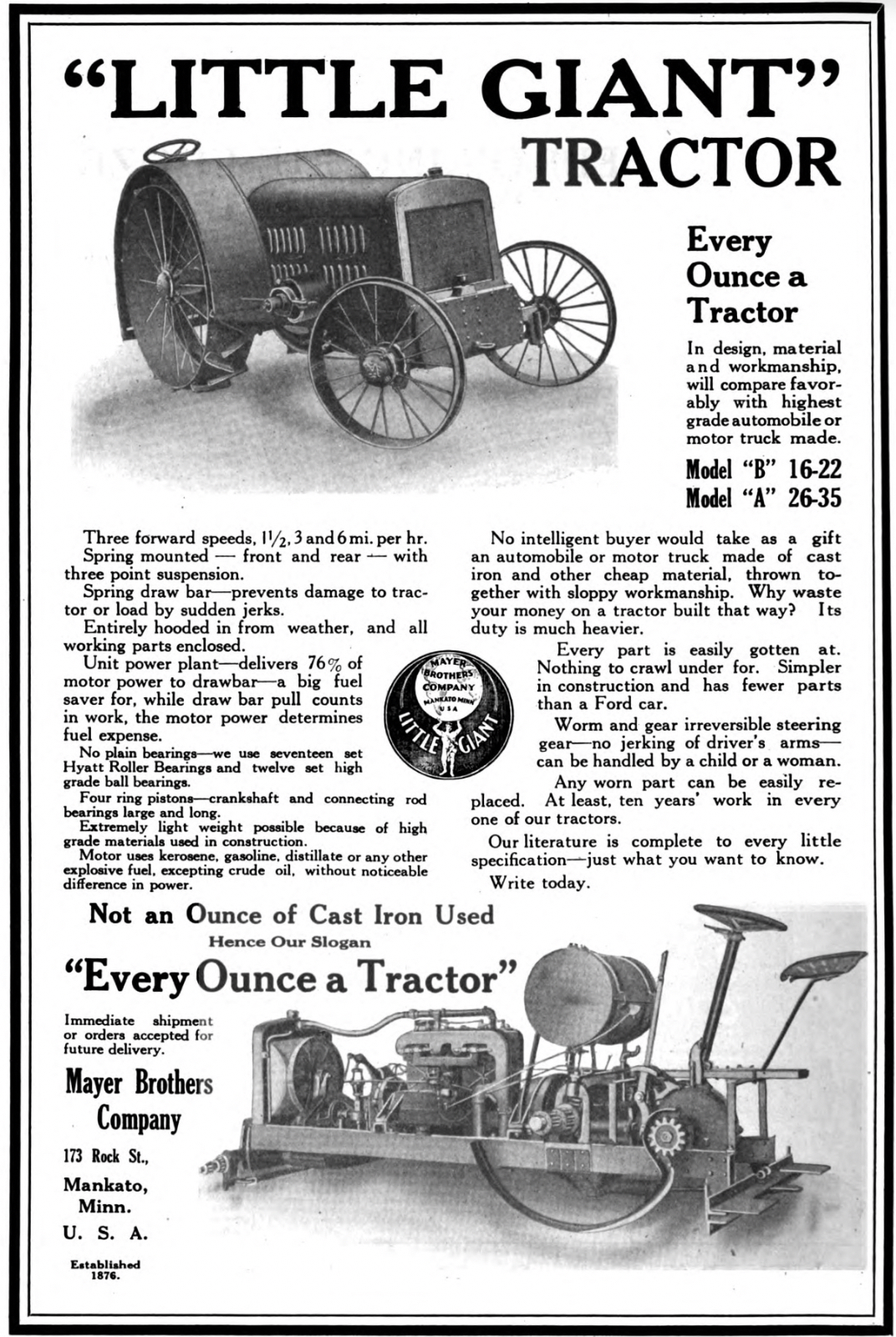
Mayer Brothers Little Giant Model A & Model B (1913-1927)

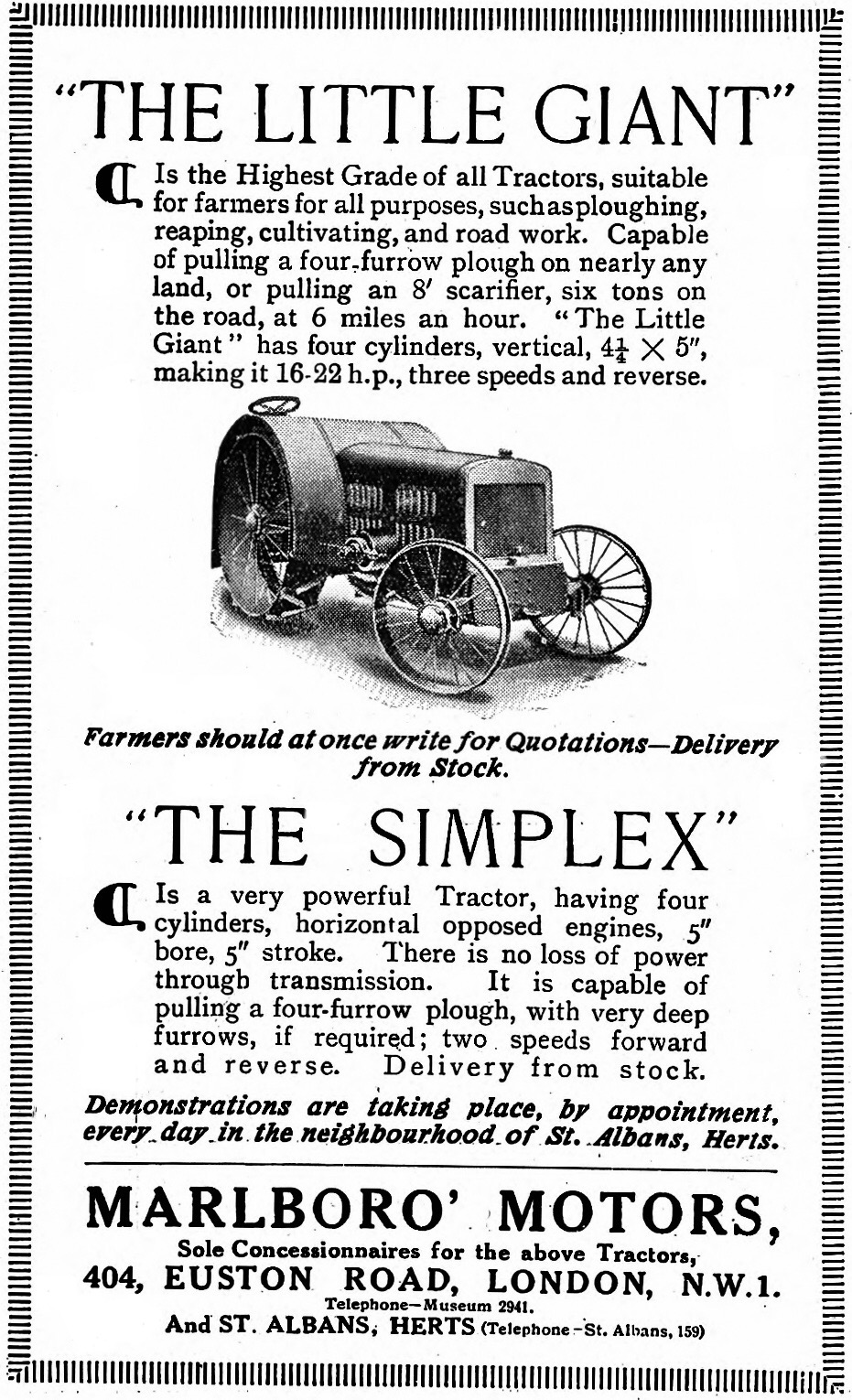
Mayer Bros. „The Little Giant“ (1918)

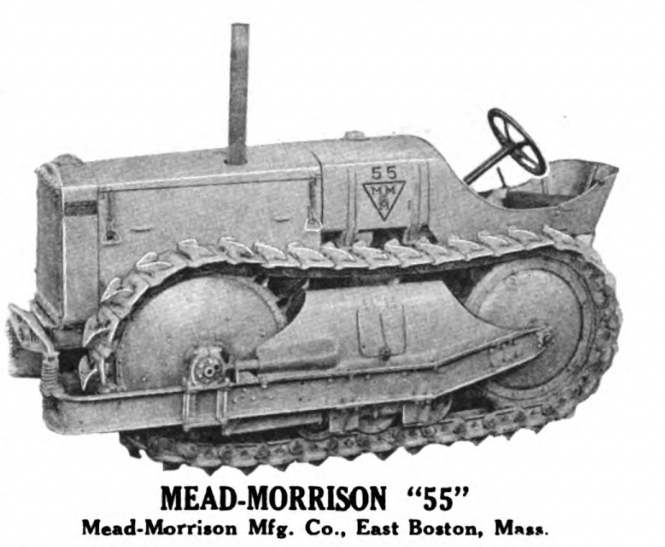
Mead-Morrison 55

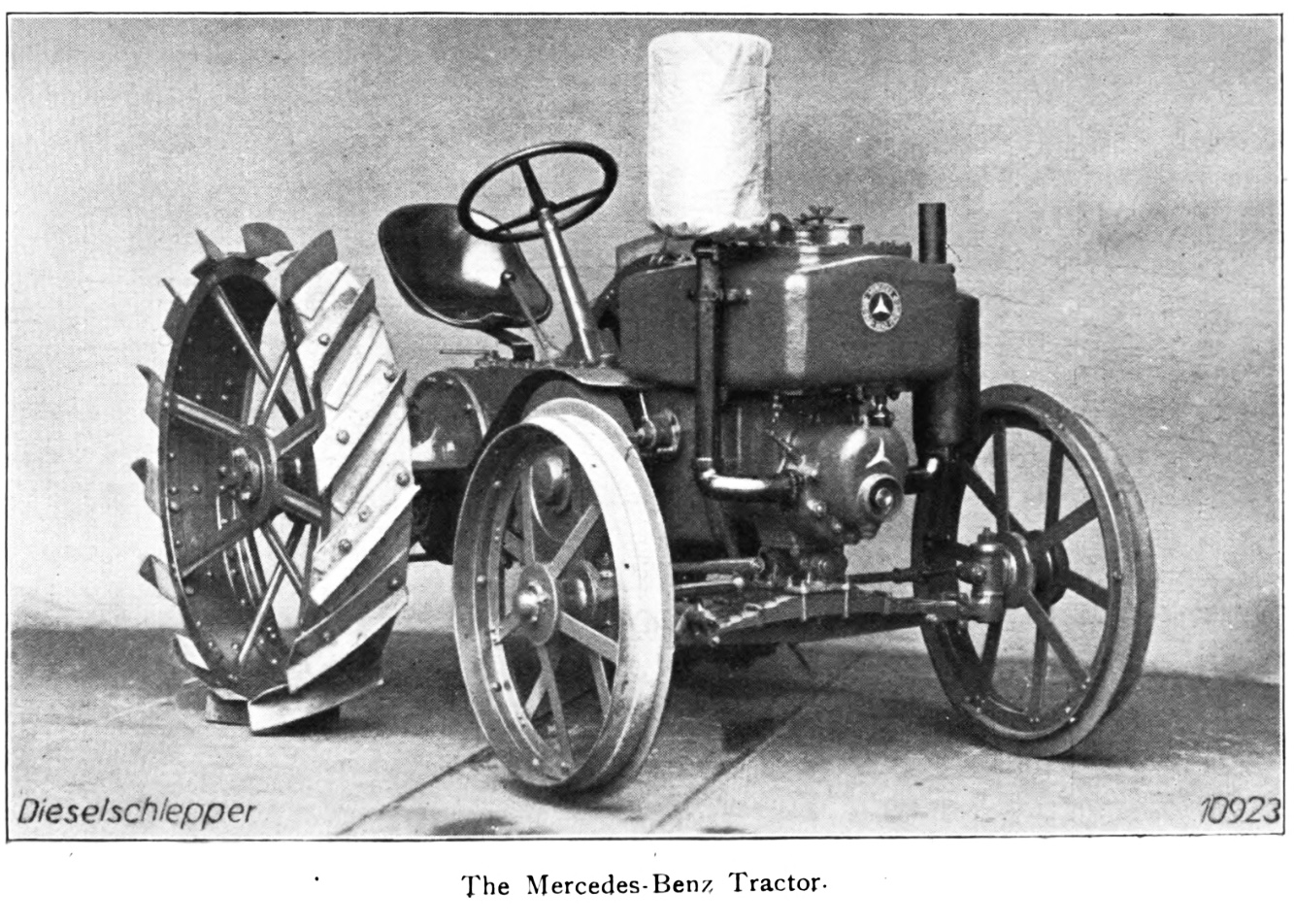
Mercedes-Benz Dieselschlepper OE (1928-1935)

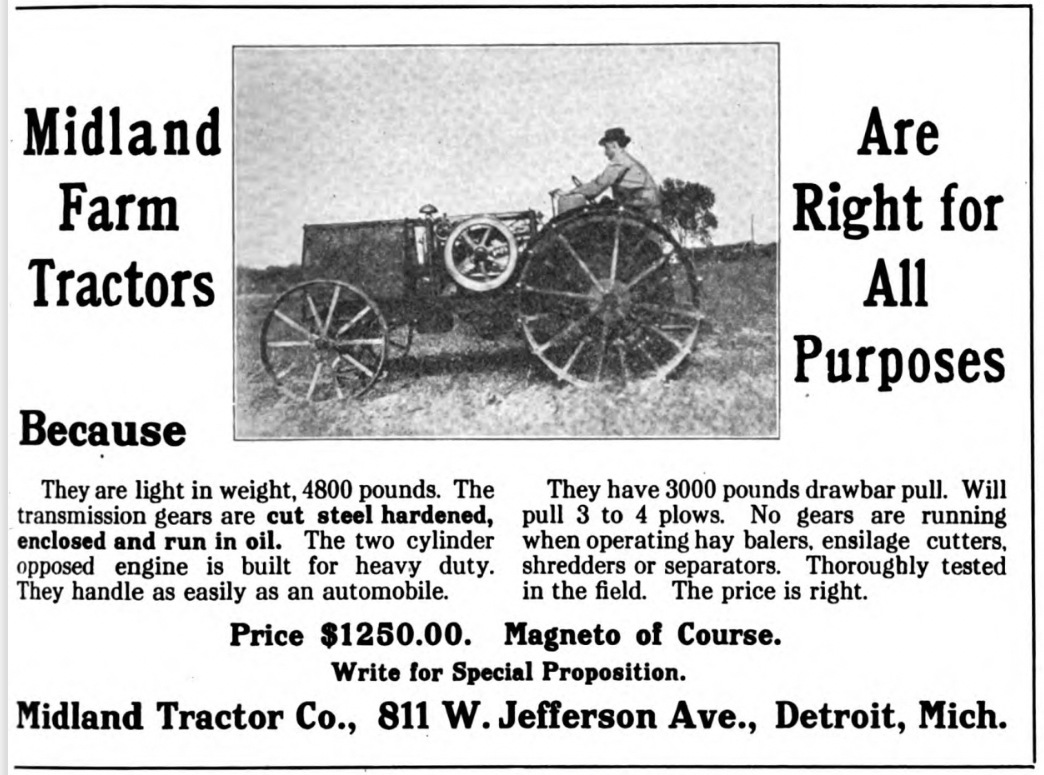
Midland Tractor (1912-1913)

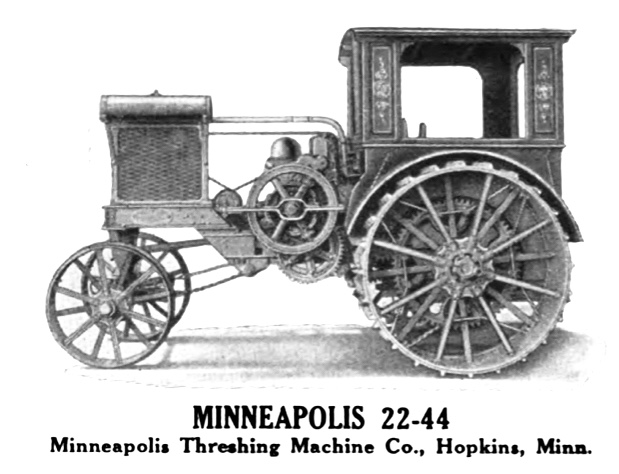
Minneapolis Treshing Machine 22-44

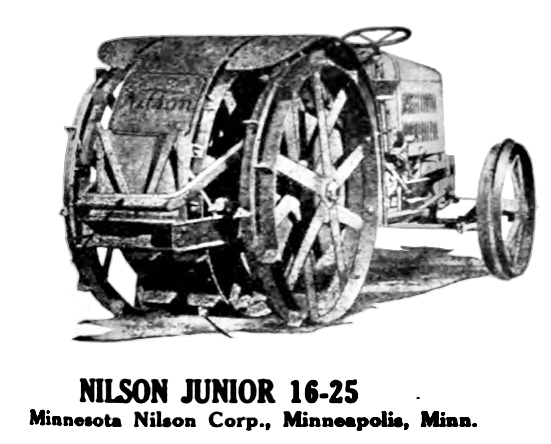
Minnesota Nilson Junior 16-25

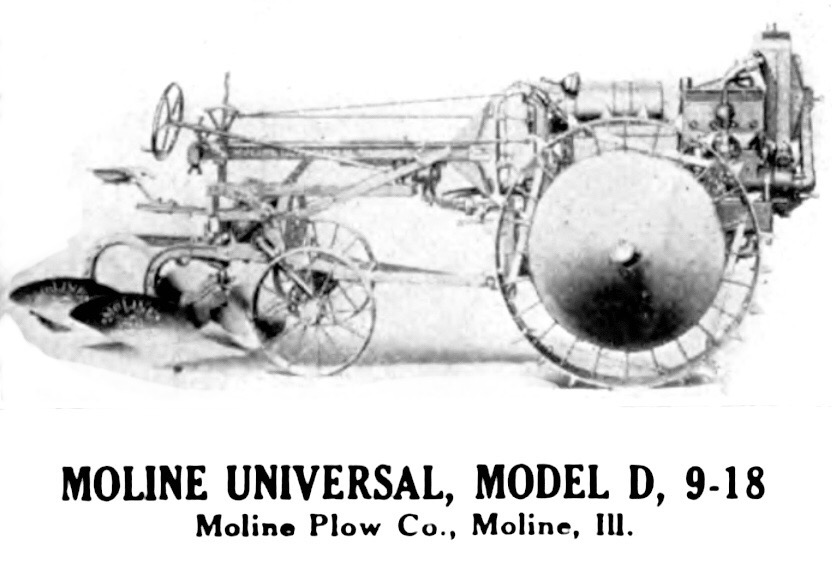
Moline Universal Model D 9-18

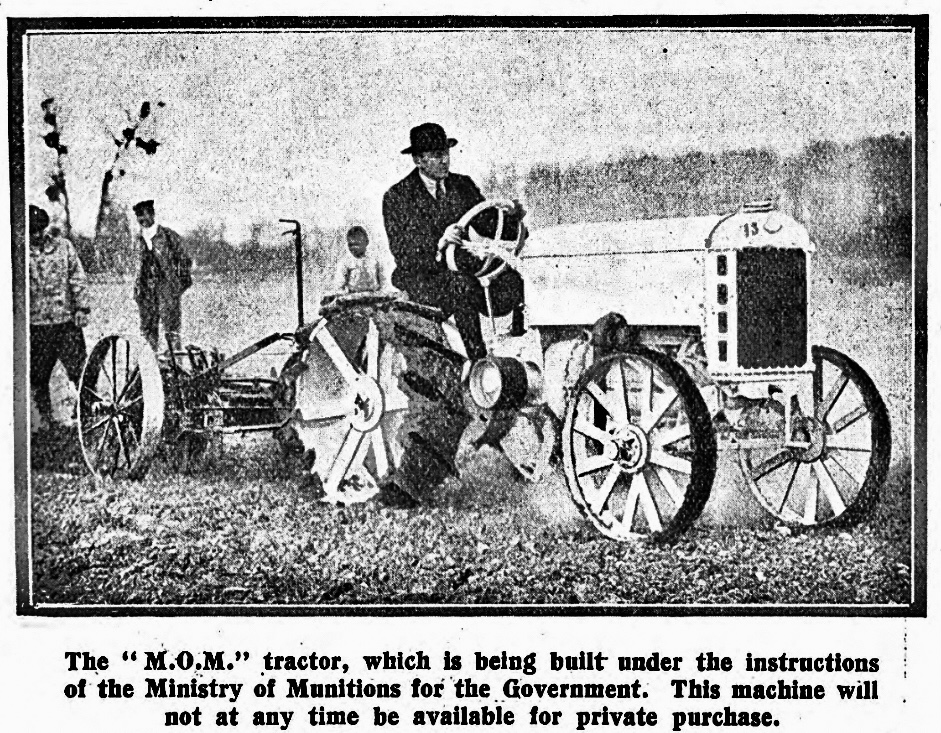
M.O.M Tractor (1918)

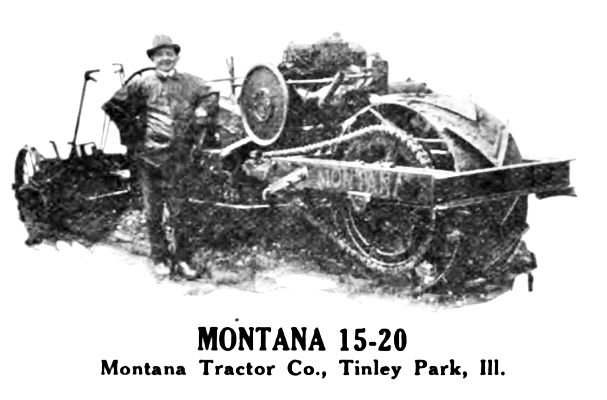
Montana 15-20

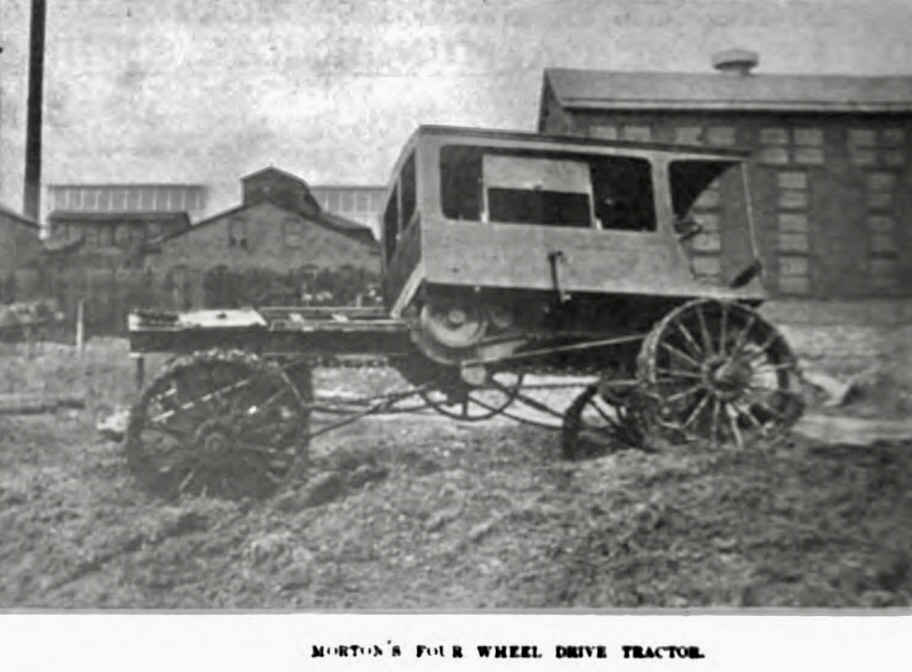
Morton (1912-1917)

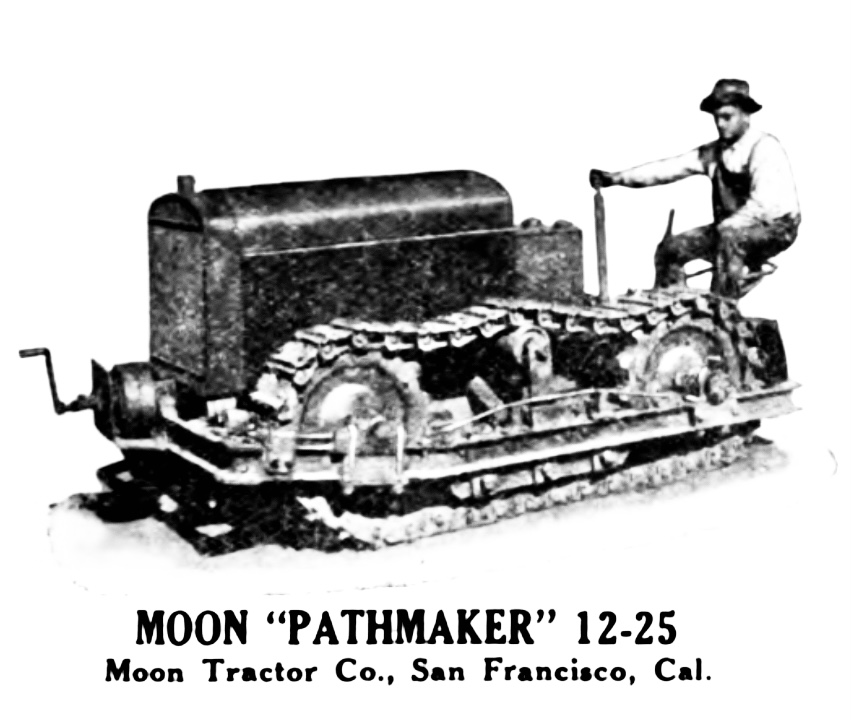
Moon Pathmaker 12-25

- M.R.S. (USA)
- MacLaren (England, UK)
- Macrosa (Argentina)
- Madson (USA)
- Magnet (USA)
- Mahindra & Manhindra (India)
- Malkotsis (Greece)
- Malcus (Sweden)
- Malves (Brazil)
- Malyshev Factory (USSR)
- MAN (Germany)
- Mancini (Argentina)
- Mann's Patent Steam Cart and Wagon Company (England, UK)
- MAP (France)
- Marbach (Switzerland)
- Marion (USA) steam tractor
- Märkische Motorpflug-Fabrik (Germany) Arator
- Marshall, Sons & Co. (England, UK) – builders of Field Marshall brand
- Marshall Tractors (England, UK) – formerly Leyland tractors
- Marti (Fritz Marti) (Switzerland)
- Martin (USA)
- Martin (Germany)
- Martin Diesel (Slovak)
- Martin's (England, UK)
- Maskell (England, UK)
- Massey Ferguson USA
- Massey-Harris (Canada)
- Massey-Harris-Ferguson (Canada)
- Matbro (England, UK)
- Mathew (USA)
- Mathis-Moline (France)
- Maverick (USA)
- Maxim (USA)
- Maxion (Brazil) – backhoes still built using name
- Maxitrac
- Maxwell (USA)
- Mayer Brothers (USA)
- Maytag (USA)
- McConnell (Canada) – sold to AGCO Corporation, later AgcoStar
- McCormick (USA) – merged with others to form International Harvester
- McCormick-Deering (USA) – by International Harvester
- McCormick TOE (Turkey) – licensed IH
- McDonald Thresher (USA) steam tractor
- McDonald (Australia)
- McIntyre (USA)
- McKee Ebro (Canada)
- McLaren (England, UK) – see J&H McLaren & Co.
- McMarar (USA) steam tractor
- MDW-Fortschritt (East Germany)
- Mead-Morrison (USA)
- Mecavia (France)
- Medved (Russia)
- MeMo (USA)
- E. Meili Traktorenfabrik (Switzerland) Meili
- Mercedes-Benz (Germany) Mercedes-Benz Dieselschlepper OE
- Mercer (USA)
- Merk (Switzerland)
- Merritt & Kellogg (USA) steam tractor
- Metis (Slovak)
- MIAG (Germany)
- Midland Tractor (USA)
- Midwest Engine Corporation (USA) Midwest Utilator
- Millennium (USA)
- Minneapolis (USA) – merged with Moline Plow to form Minneapolis-Moline
- Minneapolis-Moline (USA) – purchased by White Farm Equipment
- Minneapolis Treshing (USA)
- Minneapolis-Moline Türk Traktör (Turkey)
- Minnesota (USA)
- Mistral (France)
- MODAG (Germany) MODAG
- Moffett (Ireland)
- Mogul (USA)
- Moline Plow Company (USA) – merged with Minneapolis to form Minneapolis-Moline
- M.O.M Tractor (England, UK) Ministry of Munitions
- Monarch (USA) – purchased by Allis-Chalmers
- Montana (USA)
- Montana LS (Brazil)
- Montana Solis (Brazil)
- Moon (USA)
- Moorburger Treckerwerke (Germany) Moorburger Treckerwerke
- Moosburner (Germany) Moosburner
- Morris George W. (USA) steam tractor
- Morris-Leyland (Turkey)
- Morton (USA)
- Motala (Sweden)
- Motocultores Pasquali (Spain)
- Motomeccanica (Italy) Motomeccanica
- Motoyuyera (Argentina)
- Motrac Werke AG. 1937–1969 (Switzerland)
- Motransa (Spain)
- Mountain State (USA)
- Mt. Super (Slovakia)
- MTW (Germany) – Ritscher
- Muir-Hill (England, UK)
- Müller (Brazil)
- Munktell (Sweden) – merged with Bolinder to form Bolinder-Munktell
- Muri (Switzerland)
- MVM (Russia)
- MWM (Motoren Werke Mannheim AG) (Germany)
- Myth-Holm (England, UK) – formerly Muir-Hill

== N ==
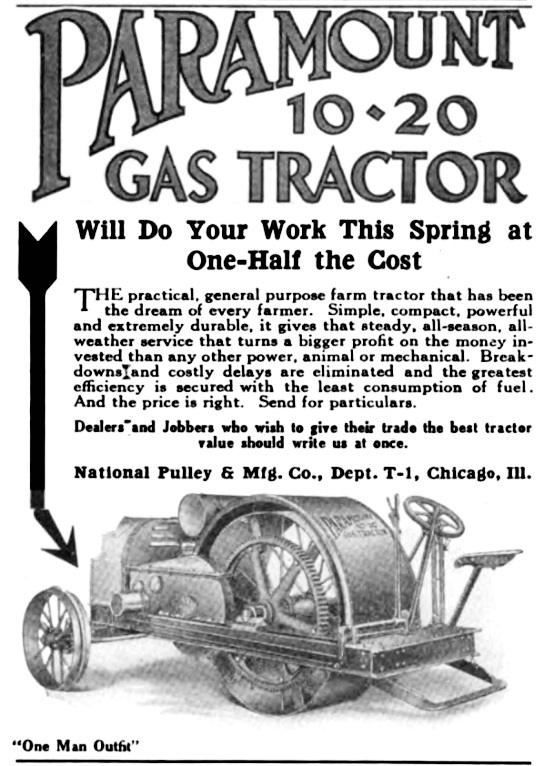
Paramount 10-20 National Pulley (1916)

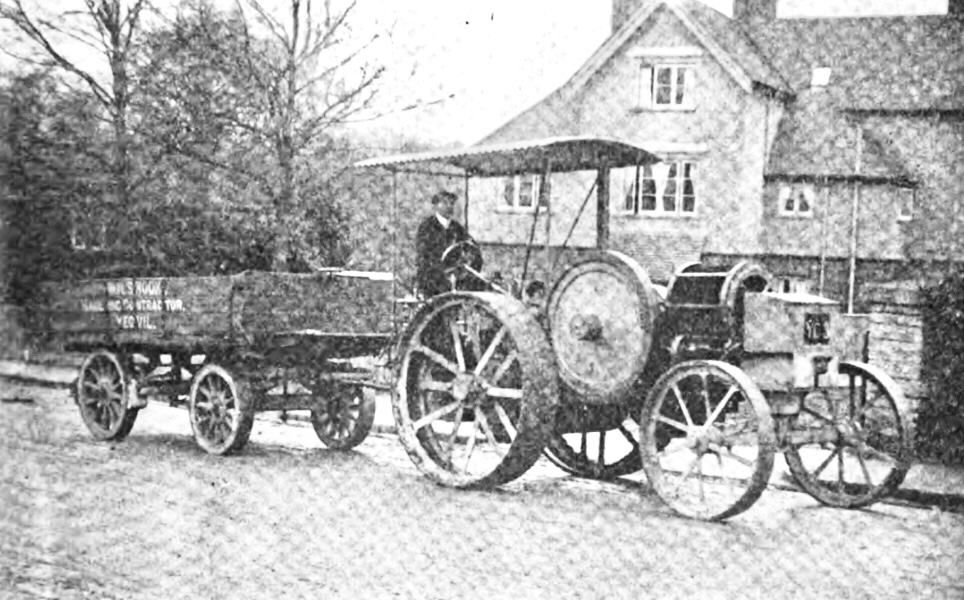
Nautilus Works 30 hp (1912)

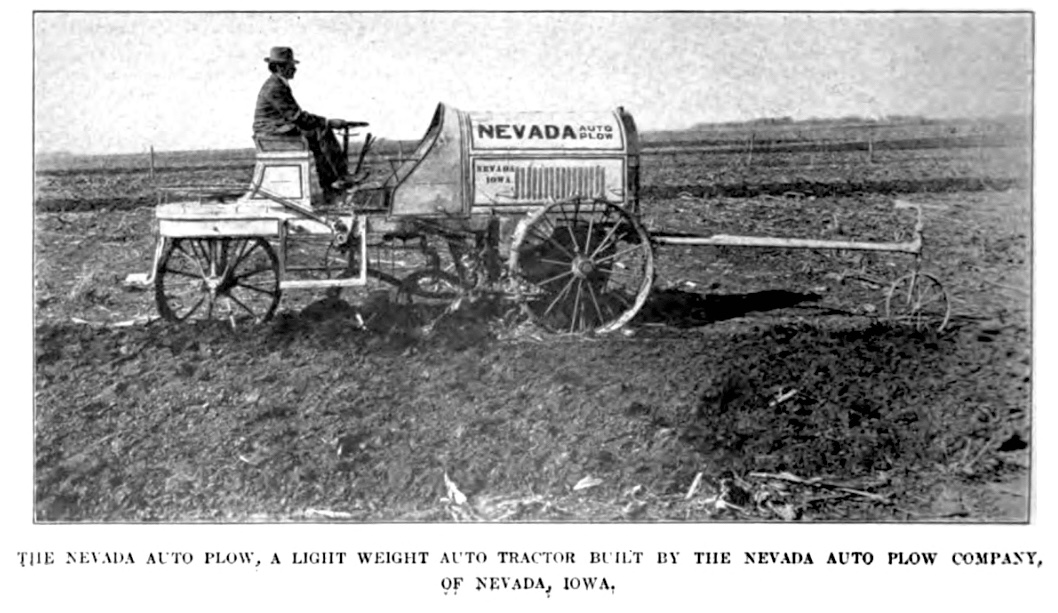
Nevada Auto Plow (1914)

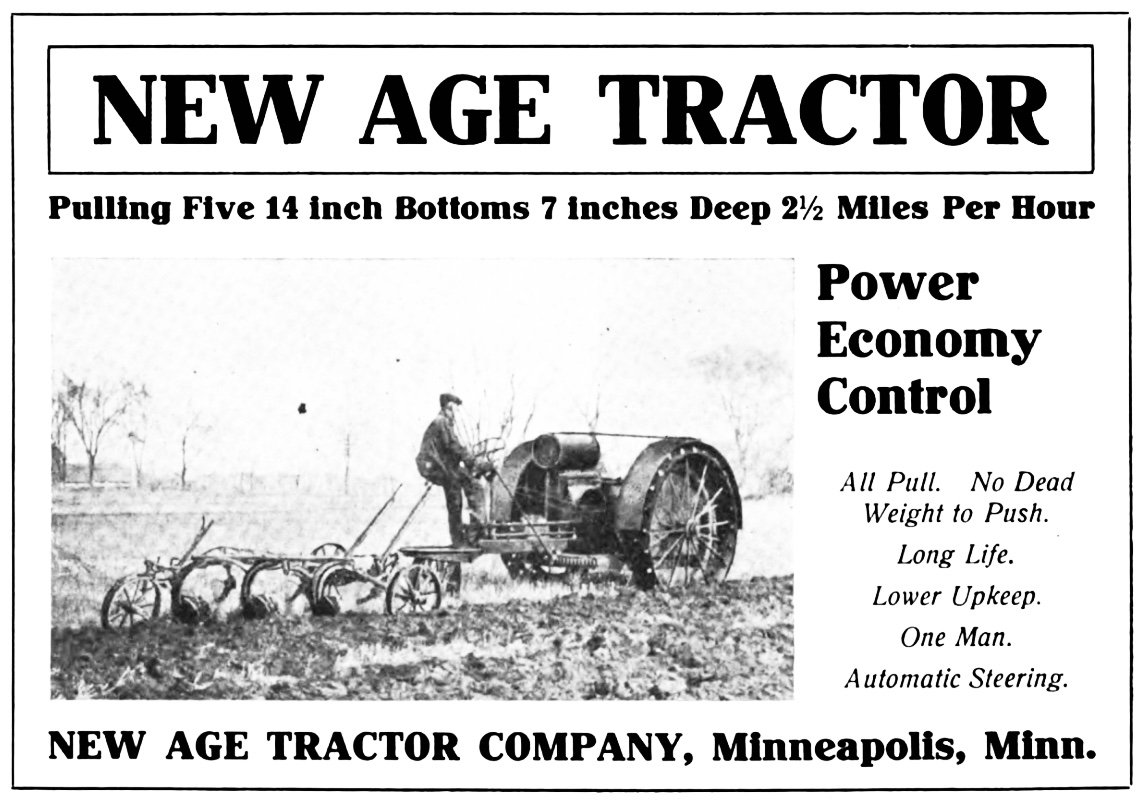
New Age Tractor (1915-1921)

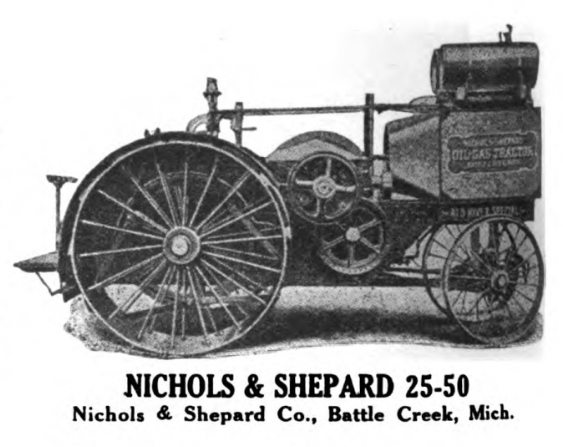
Nichols & Shepard 25-50

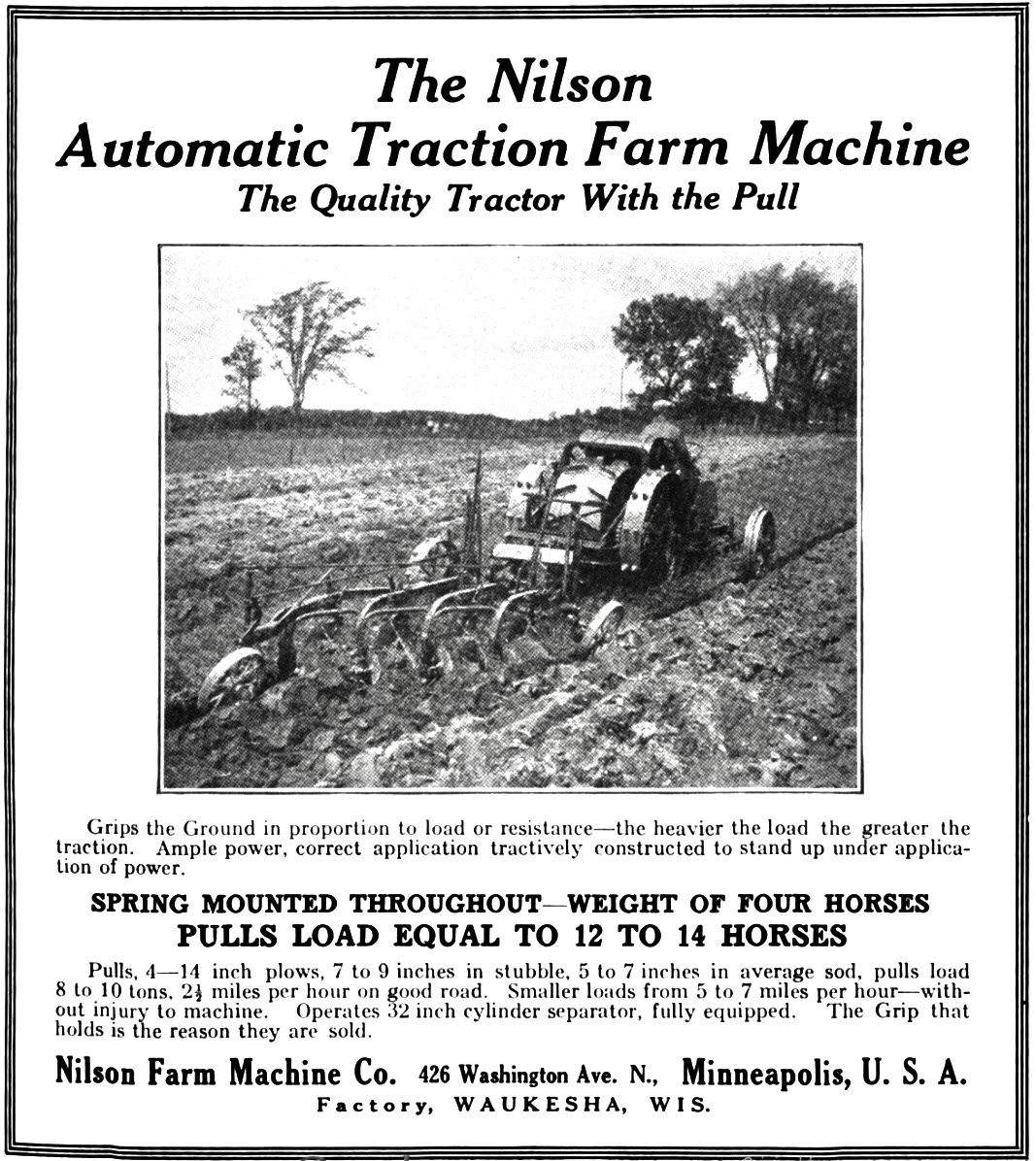
Nilson (1913-1929)

- Nallahay
- NanYue (China)
- Napoleon (USA) steam tractor
- National Pulley (USA)
- Naughton (Australia)
- Nautilus Works (England, UK)
- Nedalo (Netherlands) – Ford conversions
- Nelson (USA)
- Neuhaus (Switzerland)
- Nevada Auto Plow (USA)
- New Age Tractor (USA)
- New Britain Machine Co. (USA) garden tractor
- New Holland Agriculture (USA)
- New Holland Tractors (India)
- Newman (England, UK)
- Nibbi (Italy)
- Nichols & Shepherd (USA) – merged to form Oliver Farm Equipment Company in 1929
- Nilson (USA)
- Nohab (Sweden)
- Nordtrak (Germany) Nordtrak
- Normag (Germany) Normag
- North Land (USA)
- Northrop (England, UK)
- Northwest Thresher (USA) steam tractor
- Nuffield (England, UK) – later Leyland, and then Marshall Tractors
- Nuffield Morris (Turkey)

== O ==
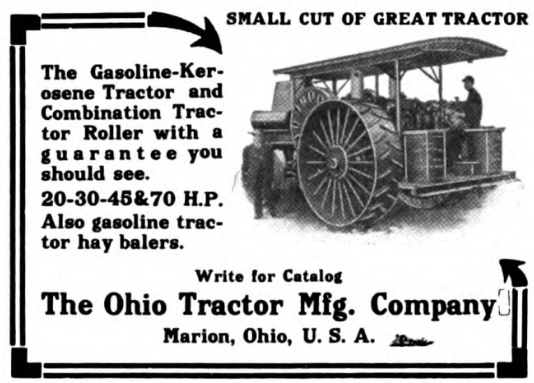
Ohio Tractor (1908-1915)

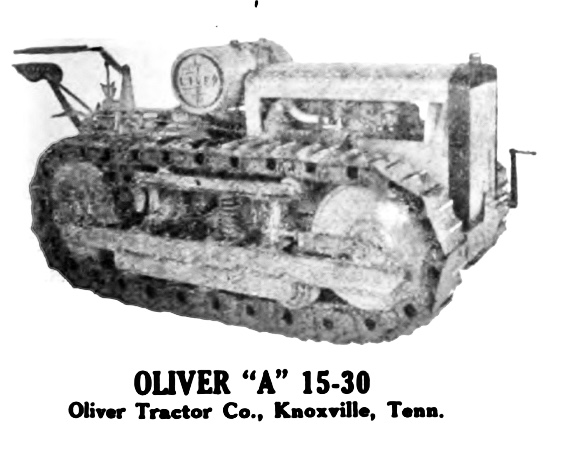
Oliver A 15-30

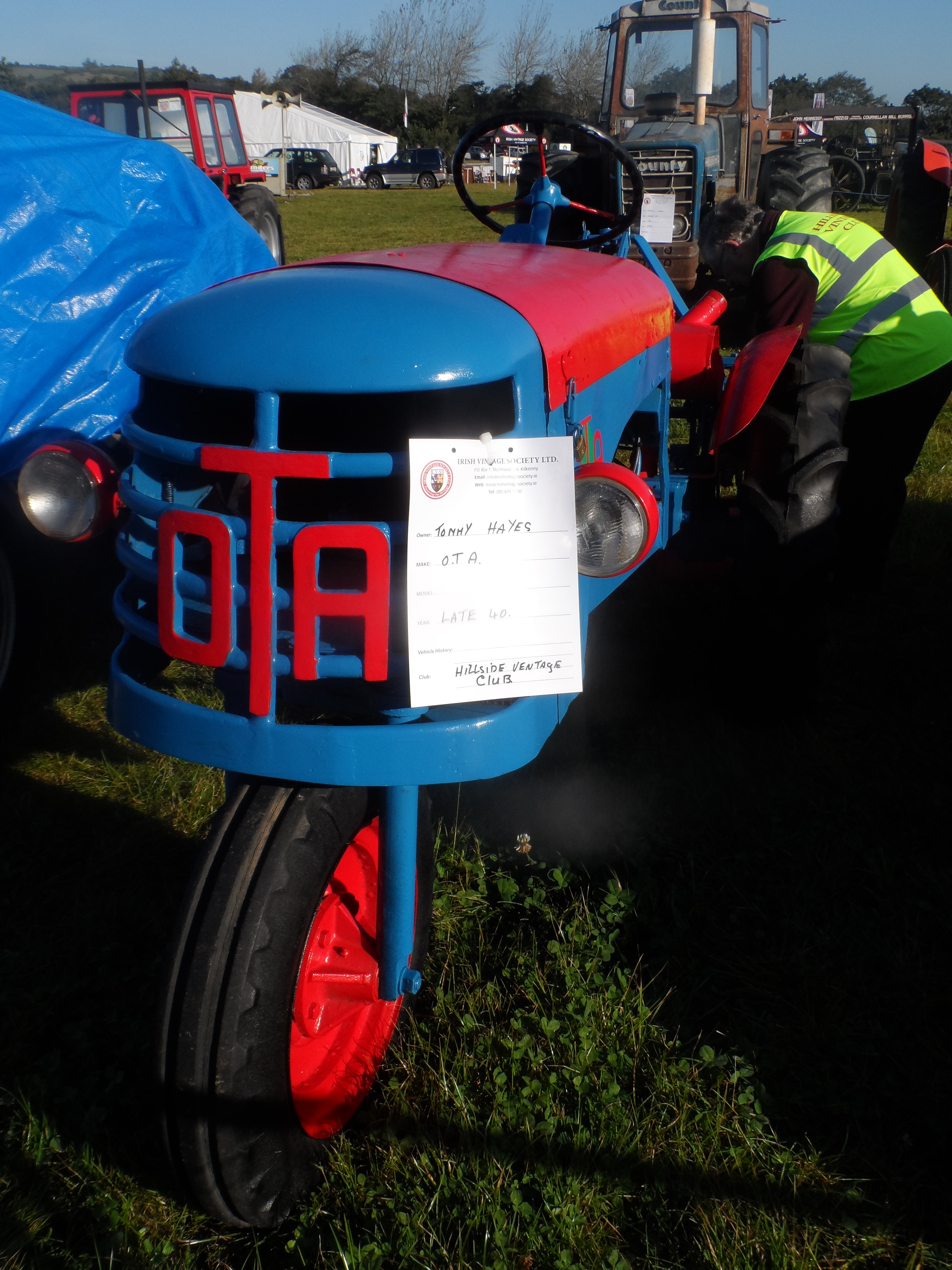
An English OTA (Oak Tree Appliances) tractor from late 1940s

- O&K / Orenstein and Koppel (Germany)
- Ohio (USA) steam tractor
- Ohio Tractor (USA)
- Oliver (USA)
  - Oliver Farm Equipment Company (USA)
  - Oliver Corporation (USA) – purchased by White Farm Equipment
  - Oliver Cletrac (USA)
  - Oliver Hart-Parr (USA)
- OM (France)
- OM (Italy)
- Omnitractor (England, UK)
- OMP (Italy)
- One Man Motor Plow (Canada)
- Opperman (England, UK)
- Orsi (Italy)
- Oak Tree Appliances (OTA) (England, UK)
- OTO (Odero Terni Orlando) (Italy)
- Ottawa (USA)
- Otto (USA)
- OUTZ
- Overtime (England, UK)/ (USA)
- Owen, Lane and Dyer (USA) steam tractor

== P ==
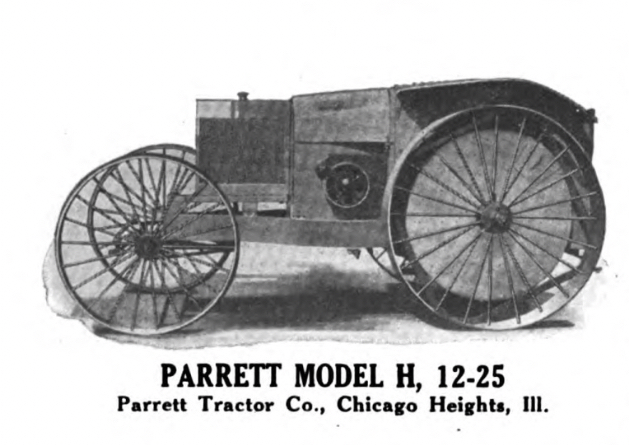
Parrett Model H 12-25

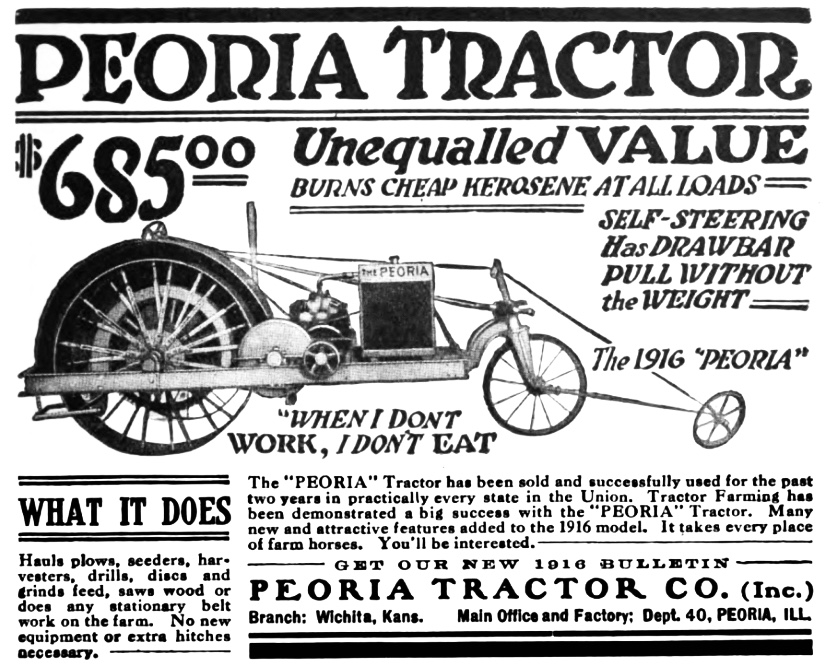
Peoria 10-20 (1914-1917)

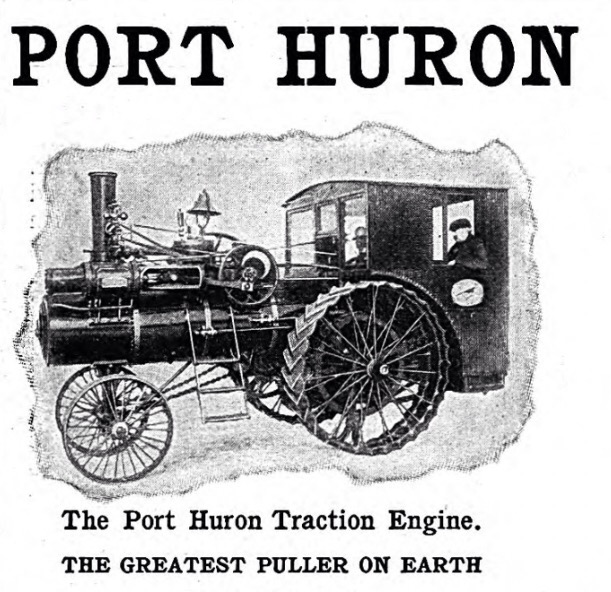
Port Huron Steam Tractor (1901)

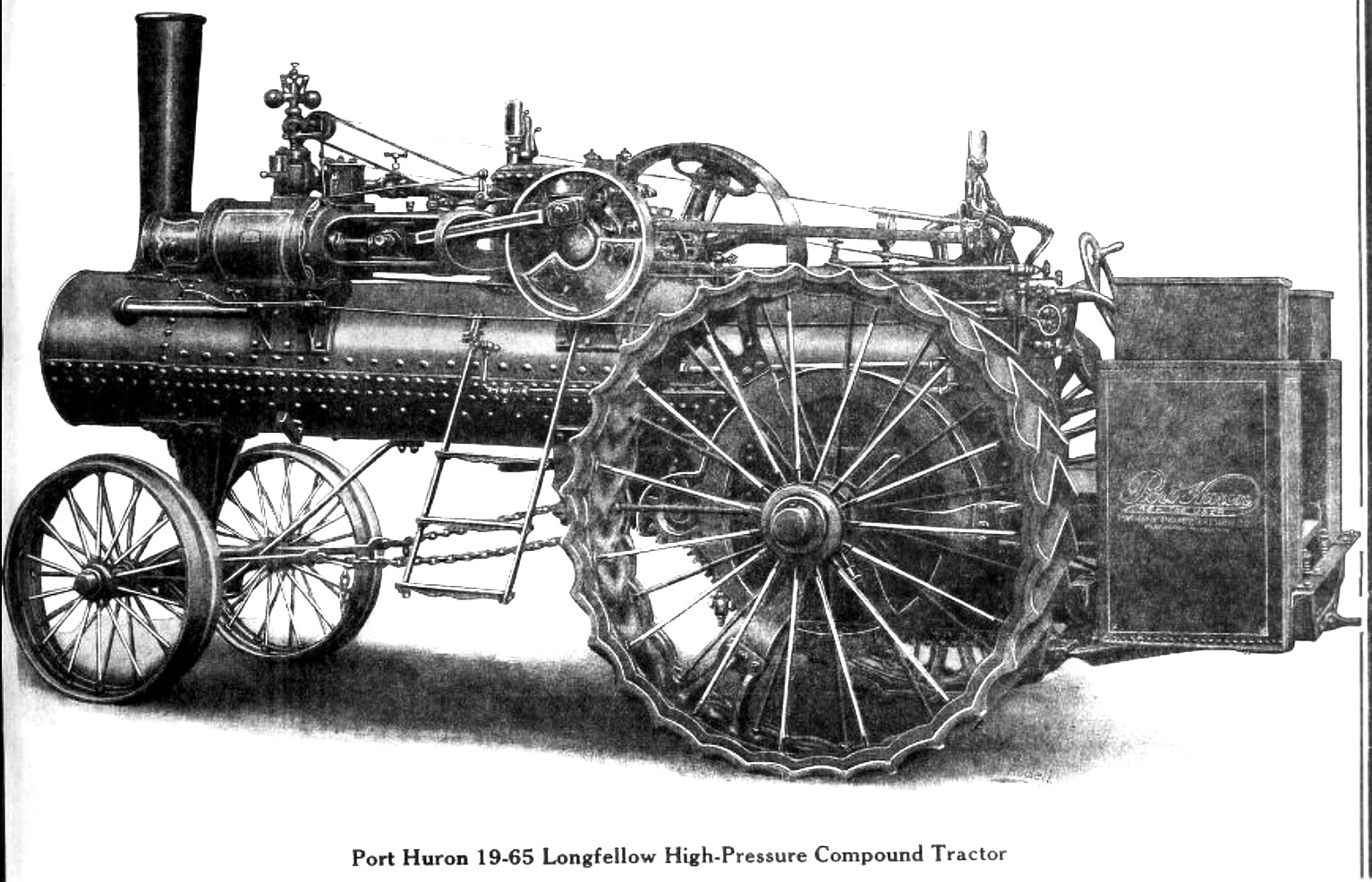
Port Huron 19-65 (1911)

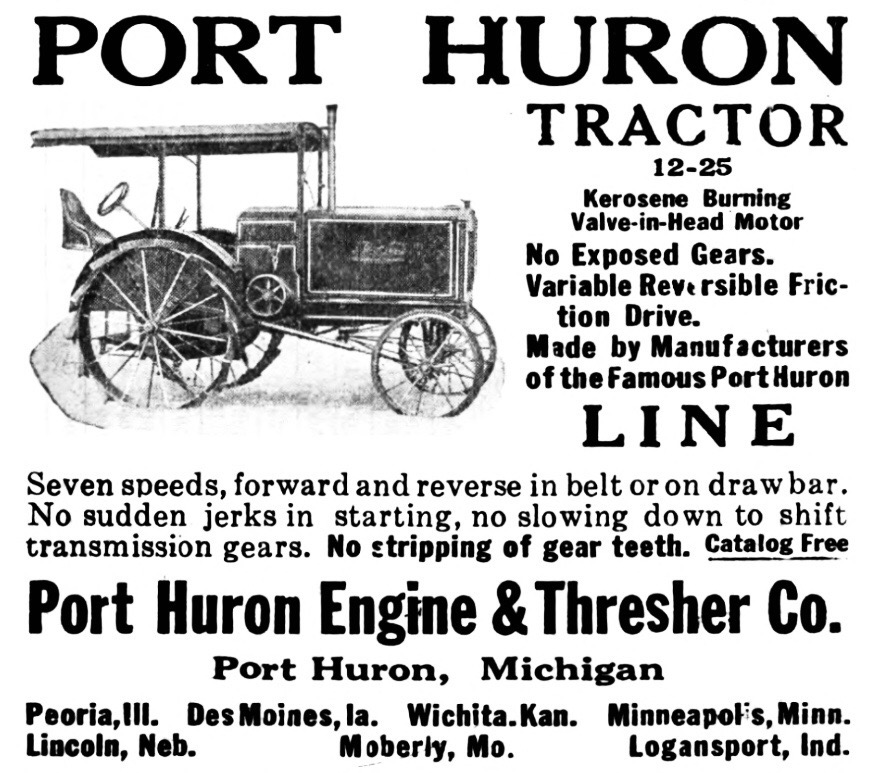
Port Huron advertisement (1921)

- Pacific Power Implement (USA)
- Page George (USA) steam tractor
- PAL (USA)
- Panda
- Panther (India)
- Panzer (USA)
- Paramount (USA)
- Parca
- Parrett (USA)
- Pasco (Brazil)
- Patissier (France)
- Pavesi (Italy)
- Pavesi-Tolotti (Italy)
- Pawlodarski (Kazakhstan) Pawlodarski
- Pecard (France)
- Peerless (USA)
- Peoria (USA)
- Perkis (Turkey) – based on Ursus
- Perl (Austria)
- Petropoulos (Greece)
- Petters (England, UK)
- PGS (Italy)
- Phillips (Australia)
- Phoenix (Australia)
- Phoenix (USA)
- Pillman (South Africa)
- Pingris & Mollet-Fontaine (France)
- Pioneer (USA)
- Pioneer (China)
- Planet, Jr (USA)
- Platten (Germany)
- Plymouth (USA) – became Silver King
- PMA (Algeria) – now Cirta
- Pöhl (Germany)
- Pollack (Argentina)
- Pol-Mot (Poland)
- Polytrac (Switzerland)
- Pontiac (USA)
- Porsche (Germany) Porsche-Diesel Motorenbau
- Port Huron (USA)
- Power Track
- Power-Horse (USA)
- Power King (USA)
- Praga (Czech)
- Prairie Queen tractors (USA)
- President (England, UK) – designed by BMB (British Motor Boats)
- Price Jacob (USA) steam tractor
- Primul (USSR)
- Primus (Germany) Primus
- Profintern (USSR)
- Pronar (Poland)
- PTZ (Kazhakistan)
- Puch (Austria)
- Punjab (India)
- Pujman (Czech)

== Q ==
- Quaker Mule (USA)
- Quattrino
- Querry & Fils (France)
- Quincy (USA)

== R ==
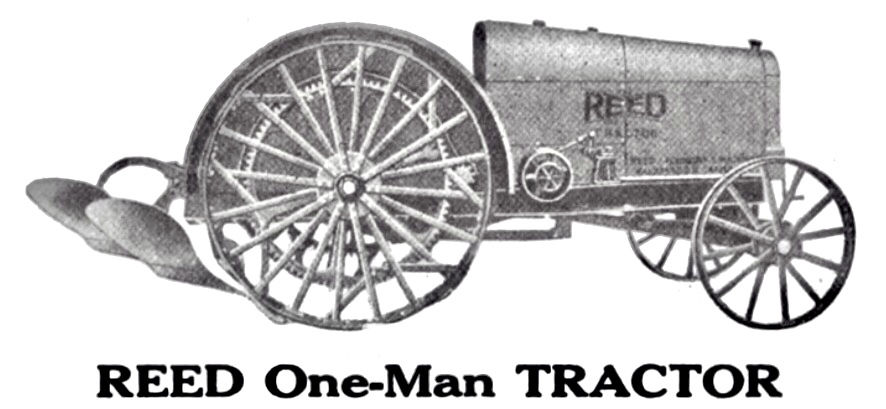
Reed 12-25 (1916-1922)

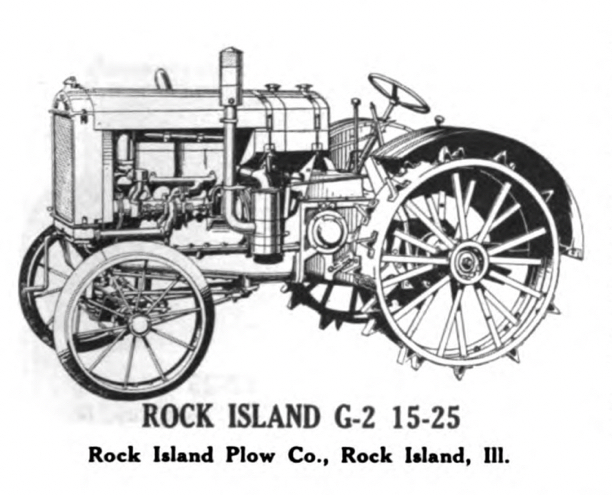
Rock Island G2 15-25 (1929-1937)

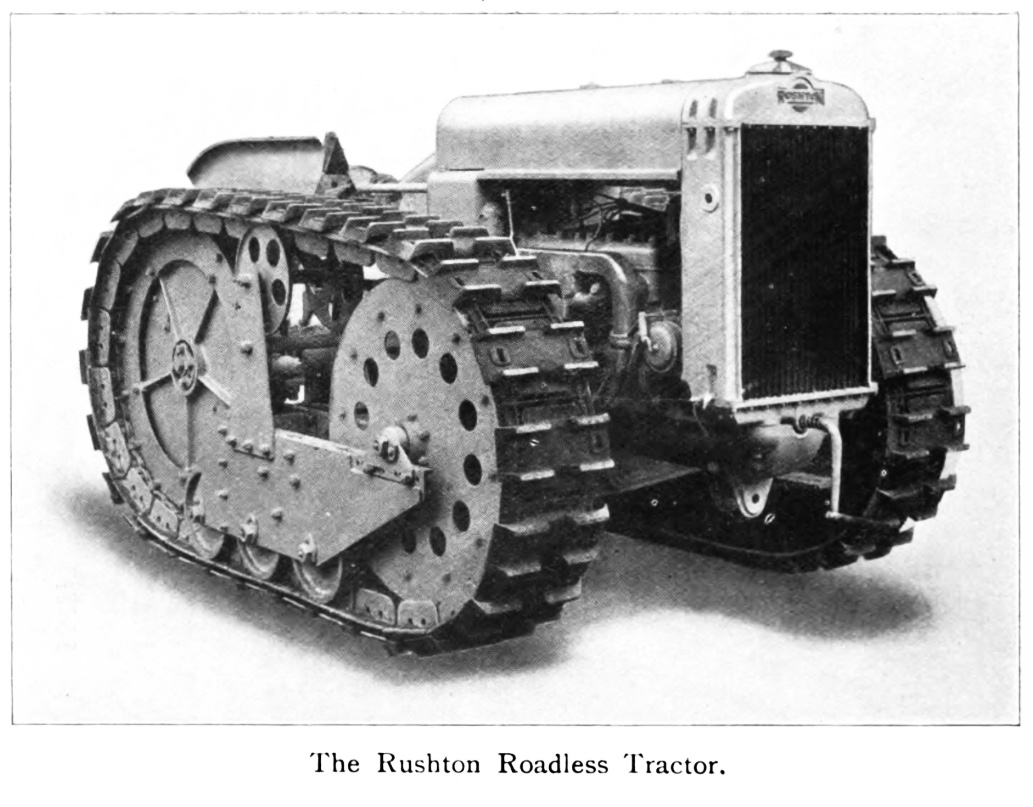
Rushton Roadless (1929-1932)

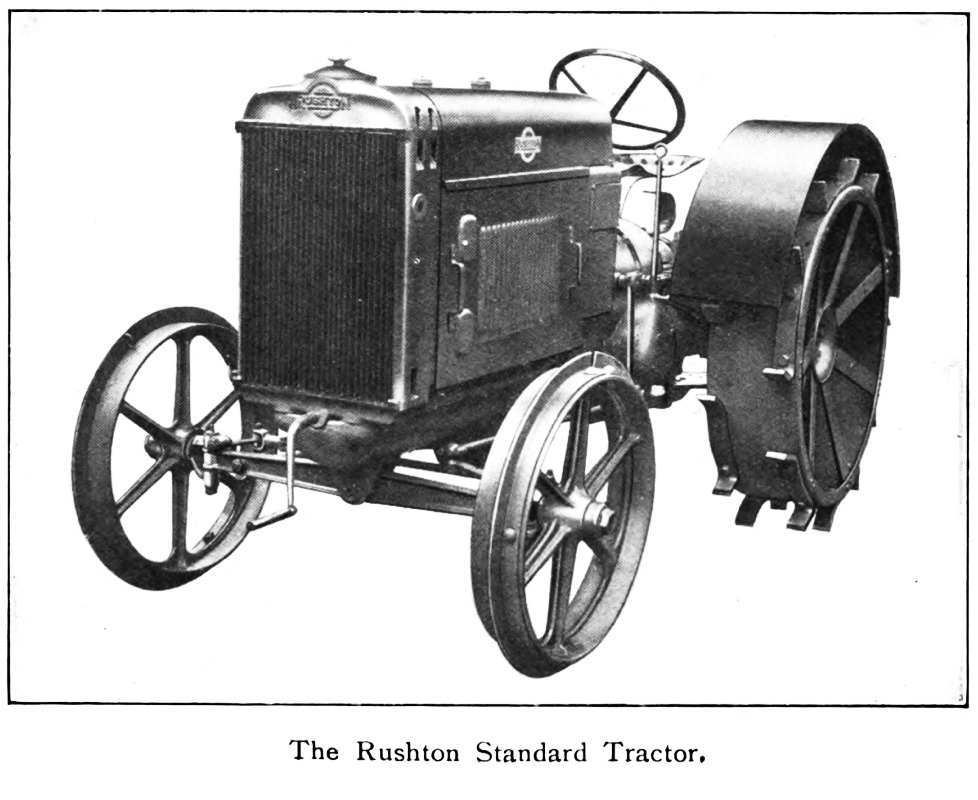
Rushton 14-20 (1929-1932)

- RÁBA (Hungary)
  - RÁBA-Steiger
- Randi (Italy)
- Ransomes, Sims & Jefferies (England, UK)
- Rapid (Spain)
- RATAR (Yugoslavia)
- Rayes (USA)
- Raygo Wagner (USA)
- Record (Greece)
- Red Star
- Reed (USA)
- Reeves (USA)
- Rein Drive (Canada)
- Remington (USA)
- Renault Agri (France) – purchased by Claas in 2003
- Renault Sonalika International (RSI) – (Mauritius / India)
- Rhino International (USA)
- Rice (USA)
- Richard Continental (France)
- Richter (Australia)
- RIMAS (Denmark) – Ford conversions
- RIP (France)
- Rite (USA)
- Ritscher (Germany)
- Rival (France)
- Roadless (England, UK)
- Roberts and Doan (USA) steam tractor
- Robinson and Co. (USA) steam tractor
- Robey (England, UK) – steam tractors
- Rock Island (USA) – purchased Heider, was then purchased by Case
- Rockol (USA)
- Rogers (USA)
- Rogowski (Brazil)
- Rohff (France)
- Röhr (Germany)
- ROLA (Sweden)
- Rollo (Denmark)
- Rombel (Romania)
- Rome (USA)
- Ronaldson Tippett (Australia)
- Ross J.M. and Sons (USA) steam tractor
- Roux
- Rotania (Argentina)
- Roths Industries (USA)
- Royal (Germany)
- R & P Tractor (USA)
- Rubine (Italy)
- Ruhrstahl (Germany) Ruhrstahl
- Rumely (USA)
- Ruris (Romania)
- Rushton (England, UK)
- Ruston (England, UK)
- Ruslan (Argentina)
- Russell & Company (Steam Tractor) - American(USA)
- Ruston & Hornsby (England, UK)
- Ruston, Proctor and Company (England, UK) – steam tractors
- Rüttger (Germany) Rüttger
- Ryan and McDonald (USA) steam tractor
- RYCSA (Argentina)

== S ==
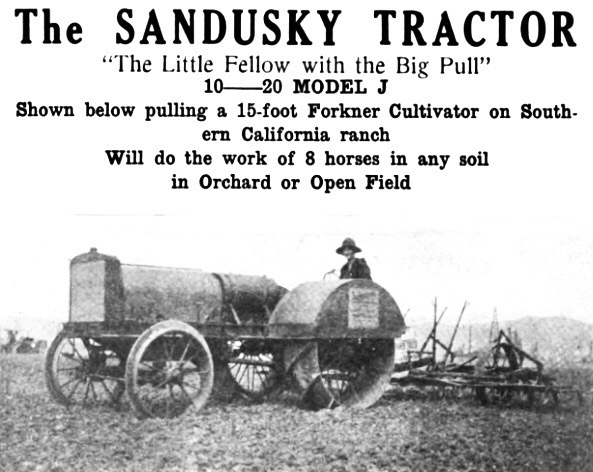
Sandusky 10-20 Model J (1918-1922)

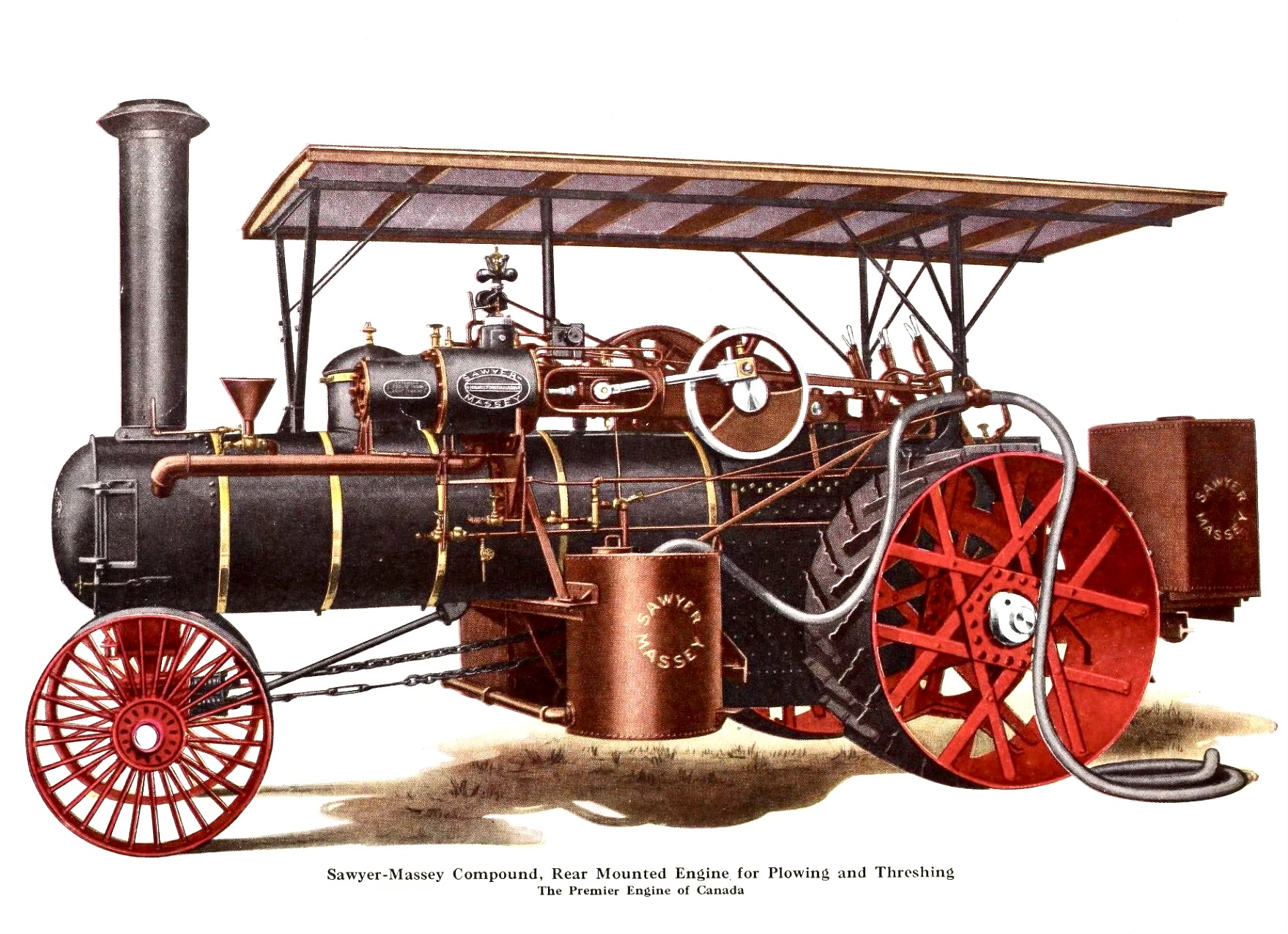
Sawyer Massey Class C (1914)

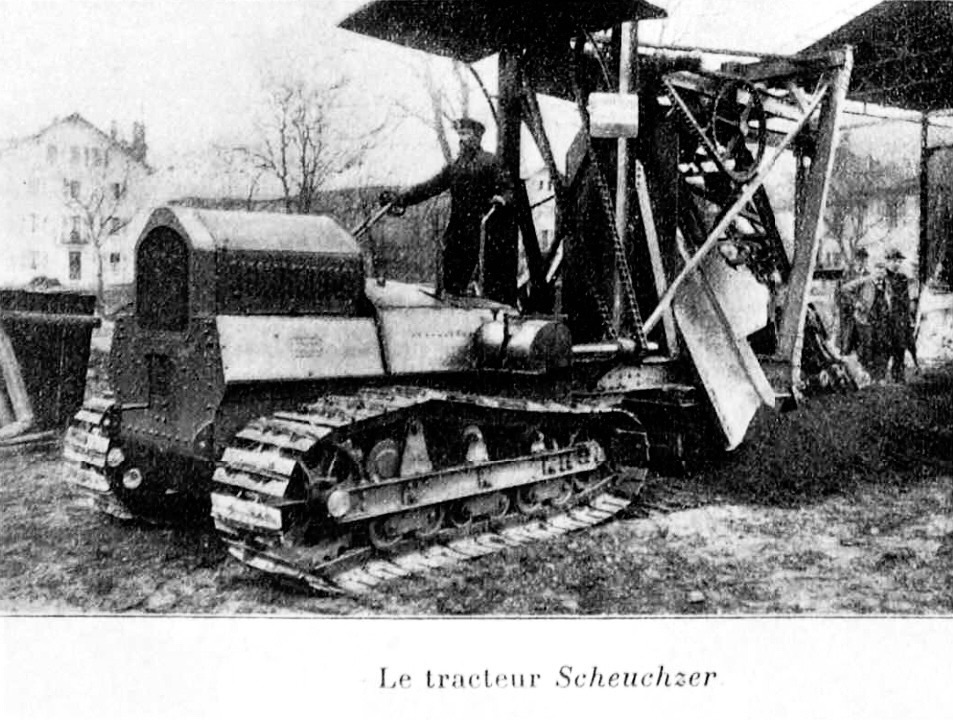
Scheuchzer tractor (1919)

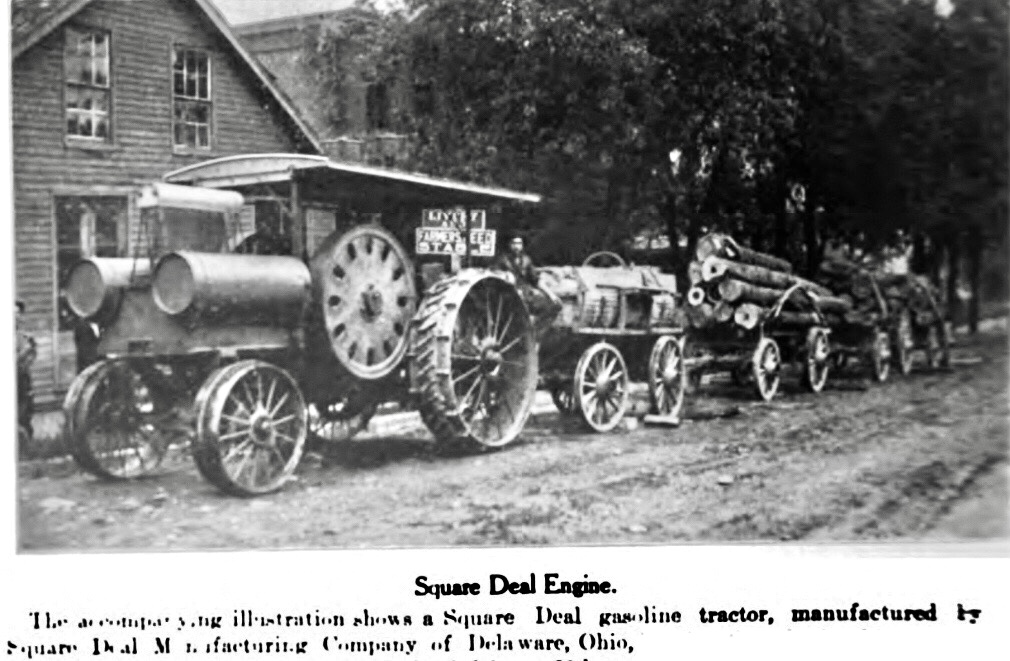
Square Deal (1909)

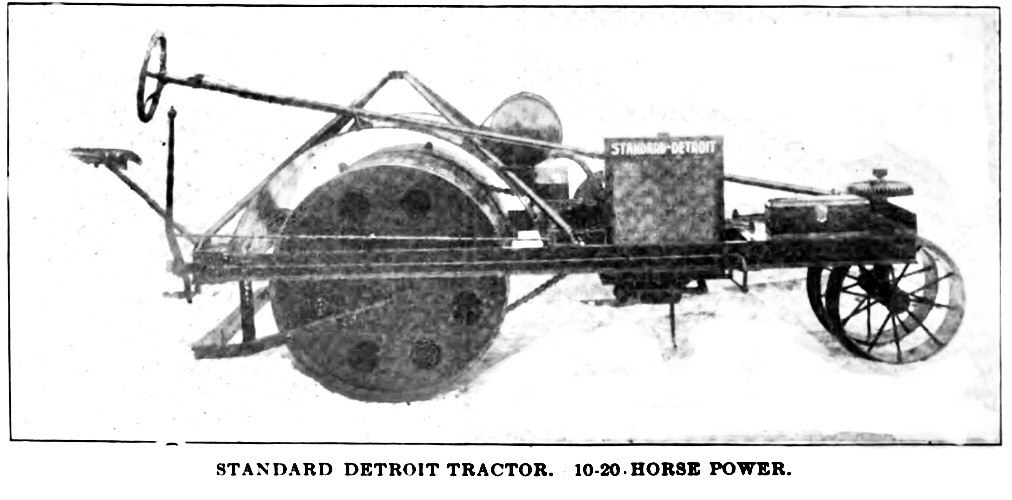
Standard Detroit (1916)

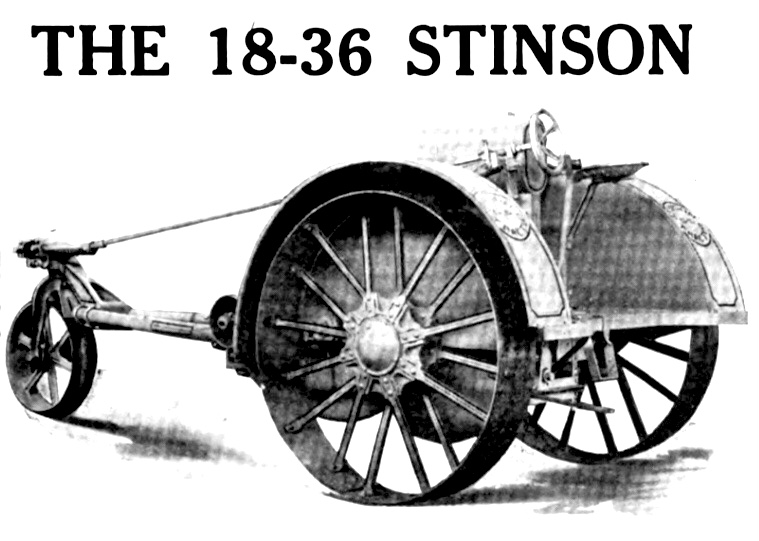
Stinson 18-36 (1918)

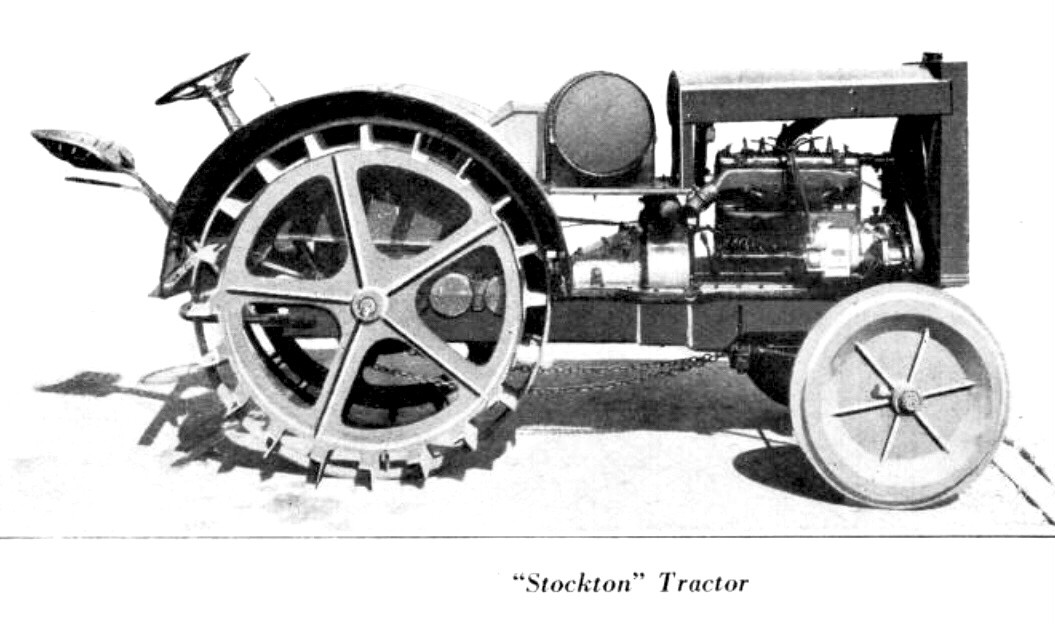
Stockton tractor (1919)

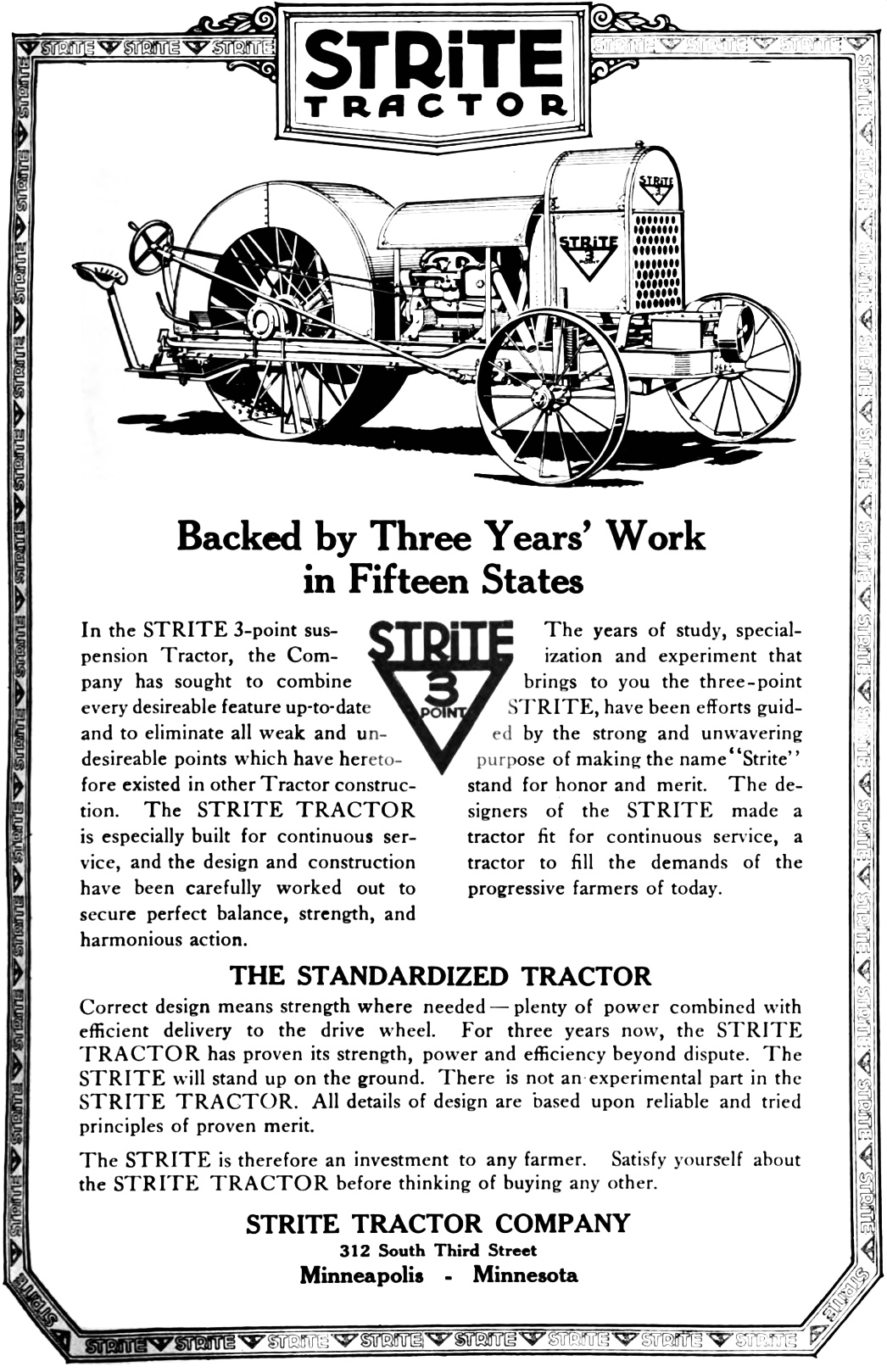
Strite (1913-1921)

- S.A.M.A. Renault (Spain)
- S.W.Wood (USA)
- Sabatier (France)
- Salvert (France)
- SAME (Italy) – taken over by Deutz-Fahr
- SAME Greaves (India) – a joint venture, wholly purchased by Same Deutz-Fahr
- Samson (USA)
- Sandusky (USA)
- Santa Matilde (Brazil)
- Satoh (Japan) – merged with Mitsubishi
- Saukville (USA)
- Saunderson (England, UK)
- SAVA-Nuffield (Spain)
- Savages (England, UK) Savages
- Savatrac (Iran)
- Sawyer Massey (Canada) steam tractor
- Scemia (France)
- Scheidler Machine Works (USA) steam tractor
- Scheuchzer (Switzerland)
- Schilter (Switzerland)
- Schindler (Germany)
- Schlepperwerk Nordhausen (Germany) Schlepperwerk Nordhausen
- Schlüter (Germany)
- Schneider (France)
- Schramm (USA)
- Schönebeck (Germany) Schönebeck
- Scott (USA)
- Scientific Farming Machinery Company (USA)
- Selene (Italy)
- Sepa (Italy)
- Shakti (India)
- Shaw (USA)
- Shelby (USA)
- Shire
- Short Turn (USA)
- Siaco (Italy)
- SIFT (France)
- Silvatec (Denmark)
- Silver King (USA)
- SIMAR-Bodenfräse (Switzerland)
- Simpac Trak (Italy)
- Simpson Jumbo (USA)
- Sirio (Italy)
- Škoda (Czech)
- Slavia (Czech)
- SLC – John Deere (Brazil) – a joint venture, wholly purchased by Deere & Company
- SLM Schweizer Lokomotiv- und Maschinenfabrik (Switzerland)
- SM
- Smallholder (England, UK)
- Società Nazionale Officine di Savigliano (Italy)
- Société Française de Vierzon (France) – purchased by Case
- Solis Brasil (Brazil) – now just Solis
- Someca (France) – purchased by Fiat
- Somua (France)
- Sonalika International (India)
- Speedex Tractors (USA)
- Speedy
- Spencer J.O. Sons & Co. (USA)
- Springfield Engine and Thresher (USA) steam tractor
- Square Deal (USA)
- Square Turn (USA)
- Squire (Australia)
- Standard Detroit (USA)
- Standard St.Paul (USA)
- Standard (India)
- Steiger (USA) – purchased by Case
- Steinbock (Austria)
- Sterling (Canada)
- Stevens A. W. (USA) steam tractor
- Steyr Tractor (Austria)
- Steyr-Nigeria (Nigeria)
- Stinson (USA)
- Stirnimann (Switzerland)
- Stockton (USA)
- Stoewer (Germany)
- Store (Yugoslavia)
- Stotz (Belgium)
- Strite (USA)
- Strong
- Sultan (Turkey)
- Sulzer (Germany) Sulzer
- Sunshine (Australia)
- Sunshine (Kubota) (Japan)
- Sunshine Massey Harris (Scotland, UK / Australia)
- Superson
- Sutcliff
- Svedala (Sweden)
- Svoboda (Czech)
- Sweeney (USA)
- Swed-Trac (Sweden)
- Swiss Locomotive and Machine Works (Switzerland)

== T ==
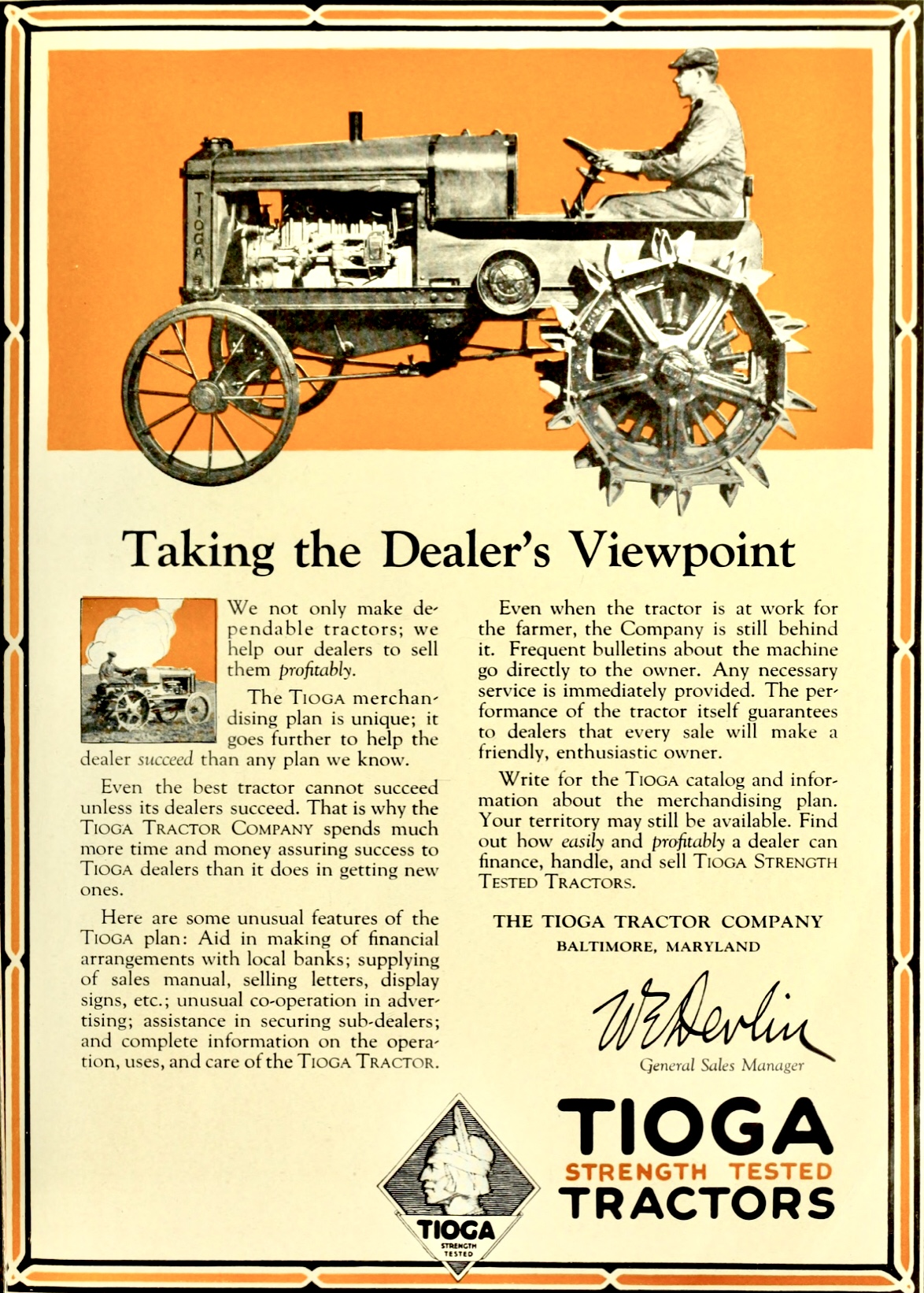
Tioga (1920-1927)

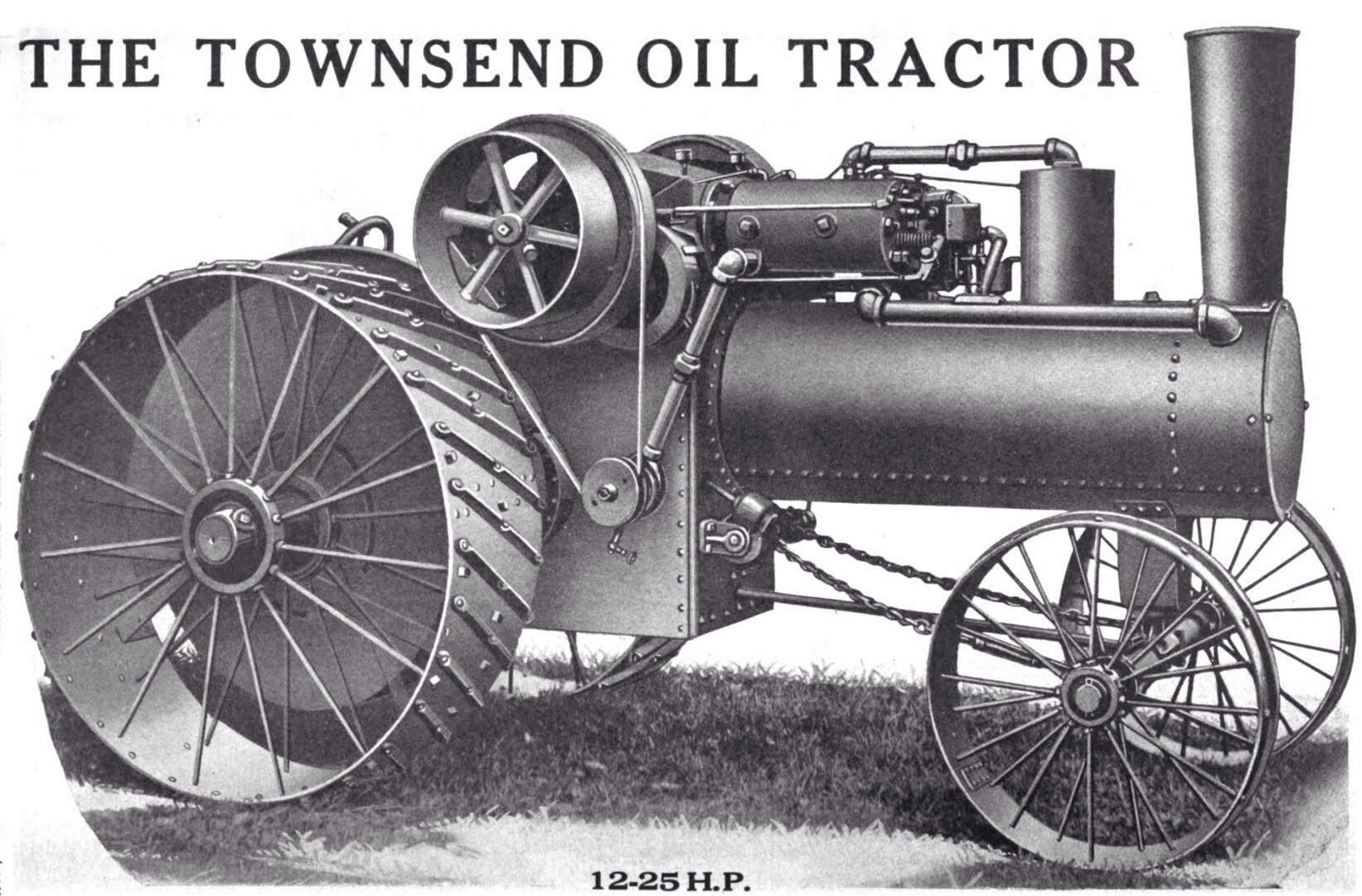
Townsend 12-25 (1918-1924)

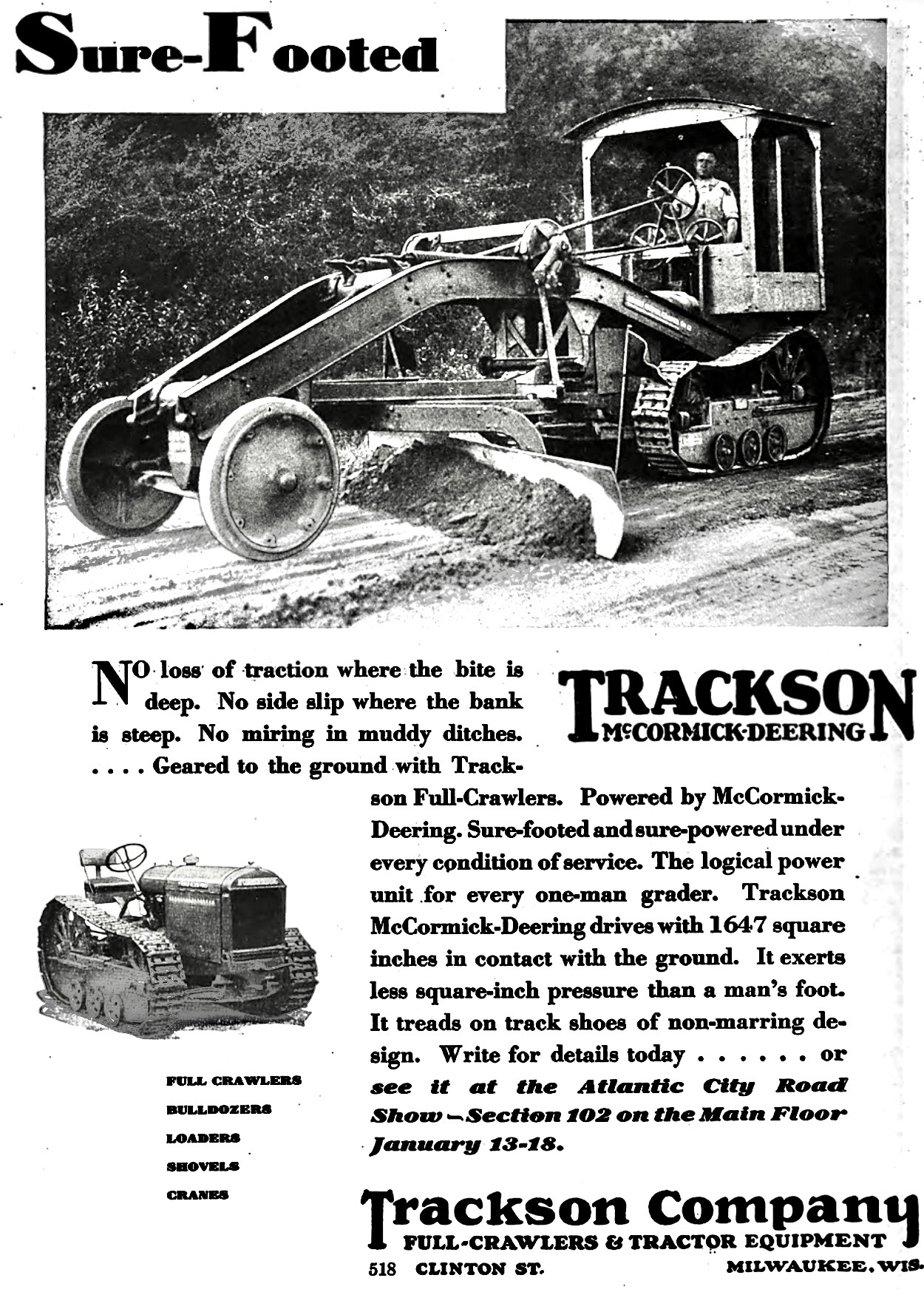
Trackson advertisement (1930)

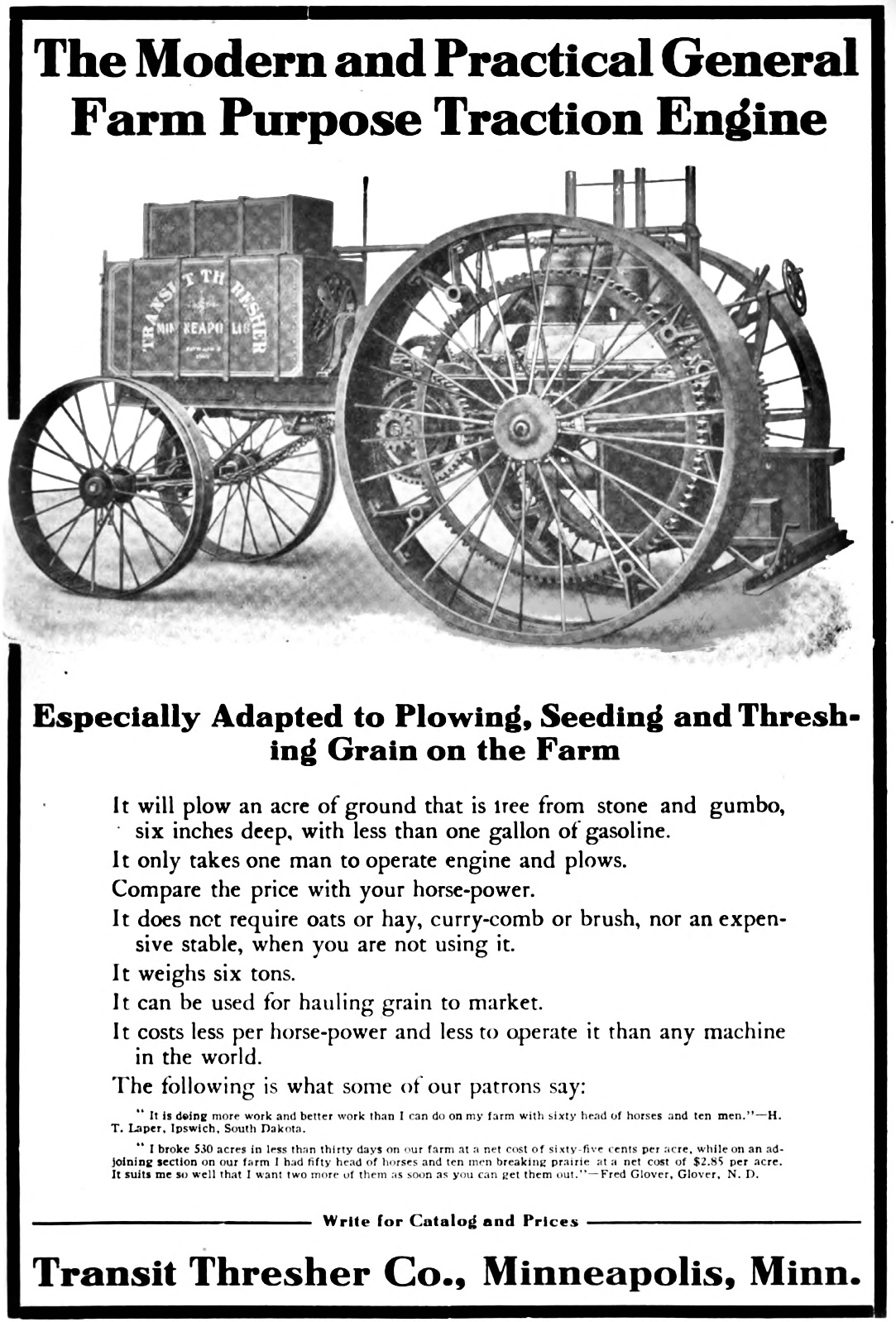
Transit Thresher 25-60 (1905-1910)

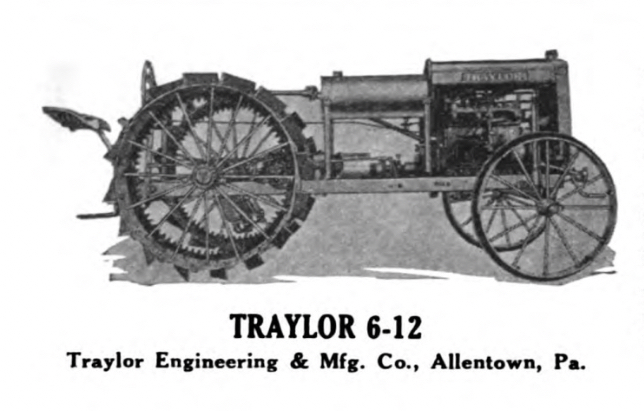
Traylor 6-12 (1920-1929)

- TAISSA (Spain)
- Takra (Finland)
- TAS (USA / Germany) – also sold as MeMo
- Tasker
- Taylor (USA)
- Terra Power
- Terratrac (USA) – crawler tractors built by American Tractor Company; purchased by J.I. Case
- TESA (Spain)
- Thieman (USA)
- Thomas-Bilt (USA) – renamed Tuff-Bilt
- Thorobred (USA)
- TianTuo (China)
- Tidaholms (Sweden)
- Tiger (USA)
- Tiger (China)
- Tiger (Ranger) (Japan)
- TigerTrac (USA)
- Tioga (USA)
- Tirador (Argentina)
- Titan (USA)
- Titan (Steiger) (USA)
- Titano (Italy)
- Titus (Germany)
- TMO (Brazil)
- Tobatta (Brazil)
- Toft (Australia)
- Tolpar (Russia)
- Tom Moore (USA)
- Toma Vinković (Croatia) – now TTB
- Toos (Iran)
- Topp-Stewart (USA)
- The Toro Company (USA)
- Torpedo (Croatia)
- Torpedo Deutz (Croatia)
- Tortone (Argentina)
- Townsend (USA)
- Trackson (USA)
- TracZa (Argentina)
- Track Marshall (England, UK)
- trac-technik (Germany)
- Traction Motor (USA)
- Tractocoop (France)
- Tractomade (Argentina) – licensed by Pauny
  - TMZ Zanello (Argentina)
  - Zanello (Tractomade)
- Tractor Supply Co. (USA)
- Tractormobile (USA)
- Transit Thresher (USA)
- Tratoretto (Brazil)
- Tractors and Farm Equipment limited [TAFE] (India)
- Tractorul UTB (Romania) – in receivership in 2007
- Traylor (USA) Traylor
  - Titan
  - Universal UTB
- Trenam Tractor (USA)
- Triunfo (Argentina)
- Trojan (USA)
- Trusty (England, UK)
- TTB (Croatia) – now Prima and Hittner
- TTS Taschkentski Traktorny Sawod (Uzbekistan) Taschkentski Traktorny Sawod
- TUR (Poland)
- Turf Boss
- TurkFiat (Turkey) – now New Holland
- Türk Otomotiv Endüstrileri (Turkey) Türk Otomotiv Endüstrileri
- Turner (USA)
- Turner (England, UK)
- Twin City tractors (USA) – merged to become Minneapolis-Moline
- Twister (USA)

== U ==
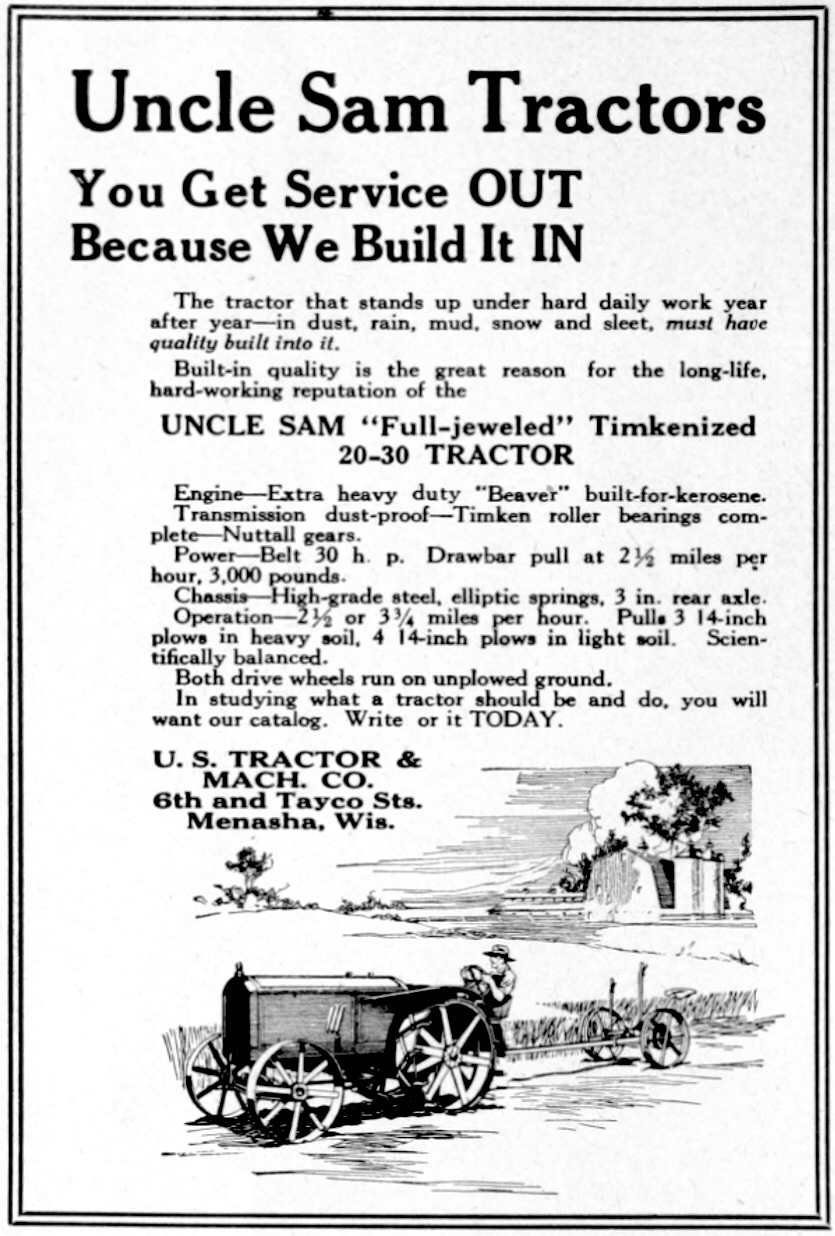
Uncle Sam Tractors (1918-1922)

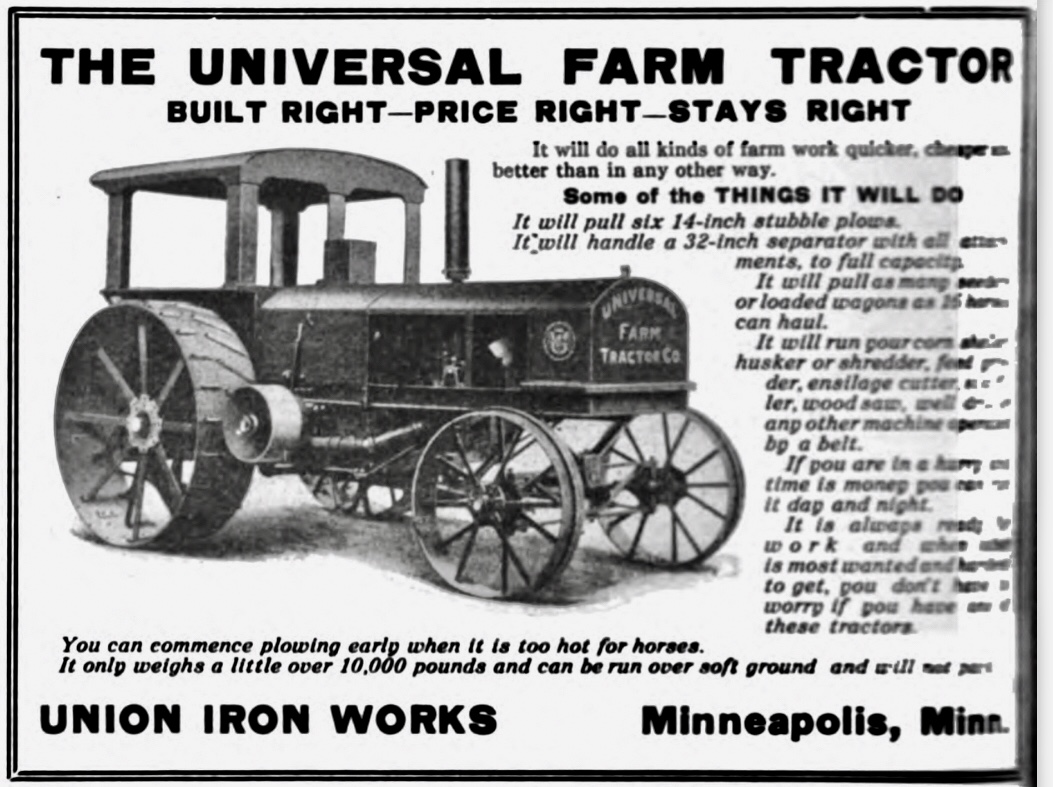
Union Iron Works (1912-1915)

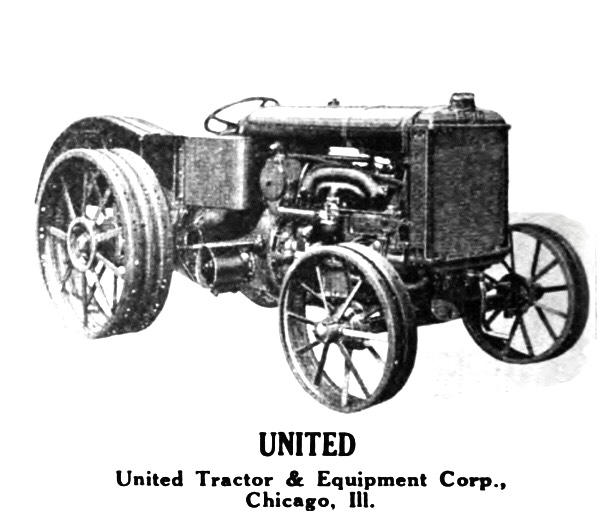
United (1929-1930)

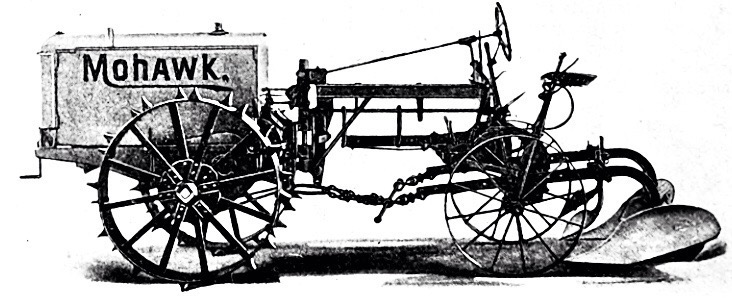
United Tractors Mohawk E 8-16 (1920-1922)

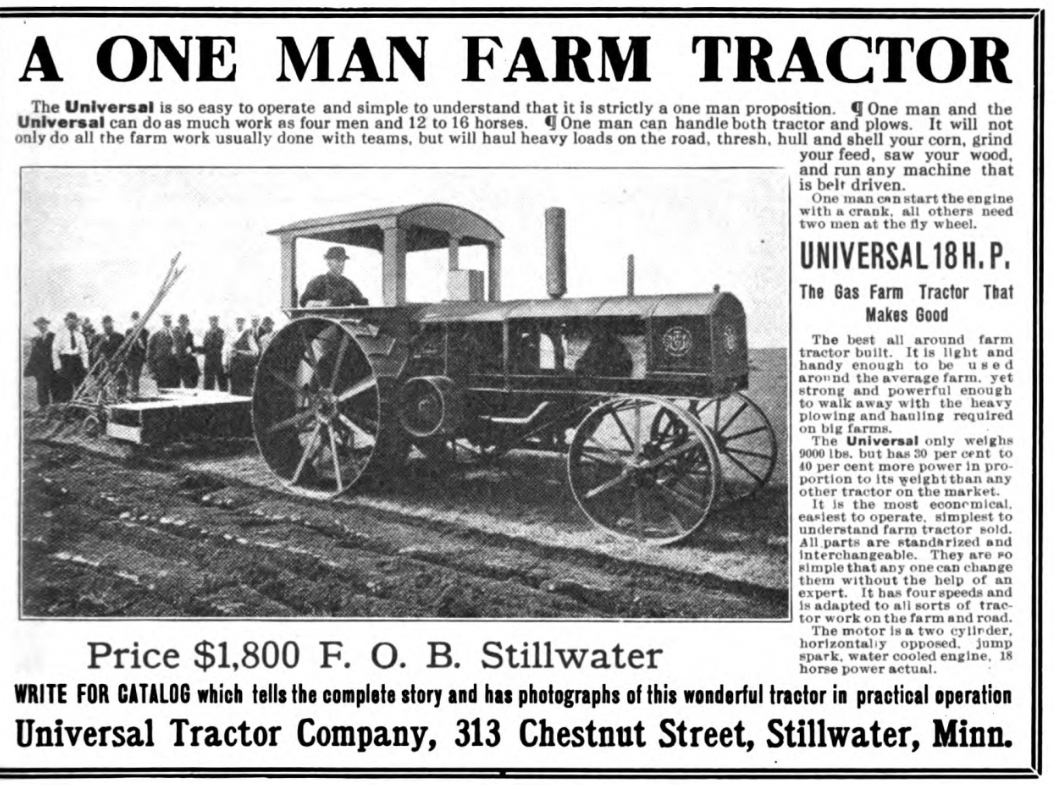
Universal Tractor Company

- U.T.B. (Romania) – now Universal UTB U.T.B.
- Uncle Sam (USA)
- Unigraf Lupo (Argentina)
- Union Iron Works (USA) steam tractor
- Union Tool (USA)
- United (USA)
- United Tractor (USA)
- United Tractors (USA)
- Unit Power Wheel (USA)
- UniTrak (Germany)
- Universal (USA) – built in Ohio
- Universal (Russia) Universal
- Universal Tractor Company (USA)
- UPD
- Upton (Australia)
- U.S. Tractor (USA)
- U.S. Tractor & Machinery (USA)
- Ursus (Germany) Ursus
- Ursus Hellas (Greece)
- Ursus Italtractor (Italy) Ursus
- Urtrak (Germany)
- Utos (Romania)
- Uzel (Turkey) ()

== V ==
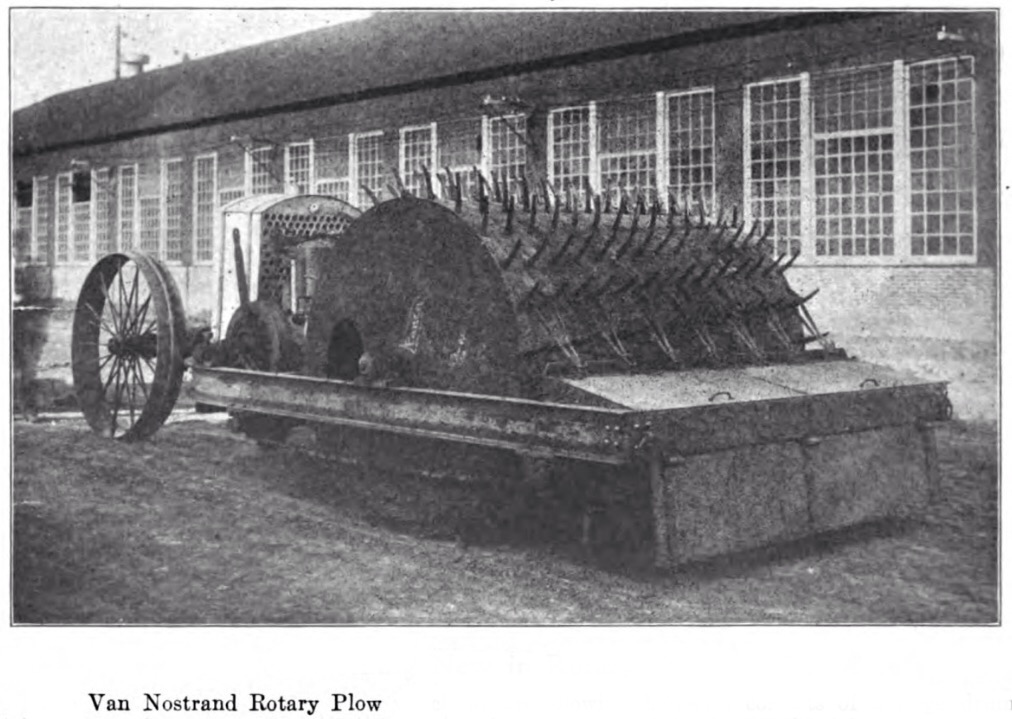
Van Nostrand (1913)

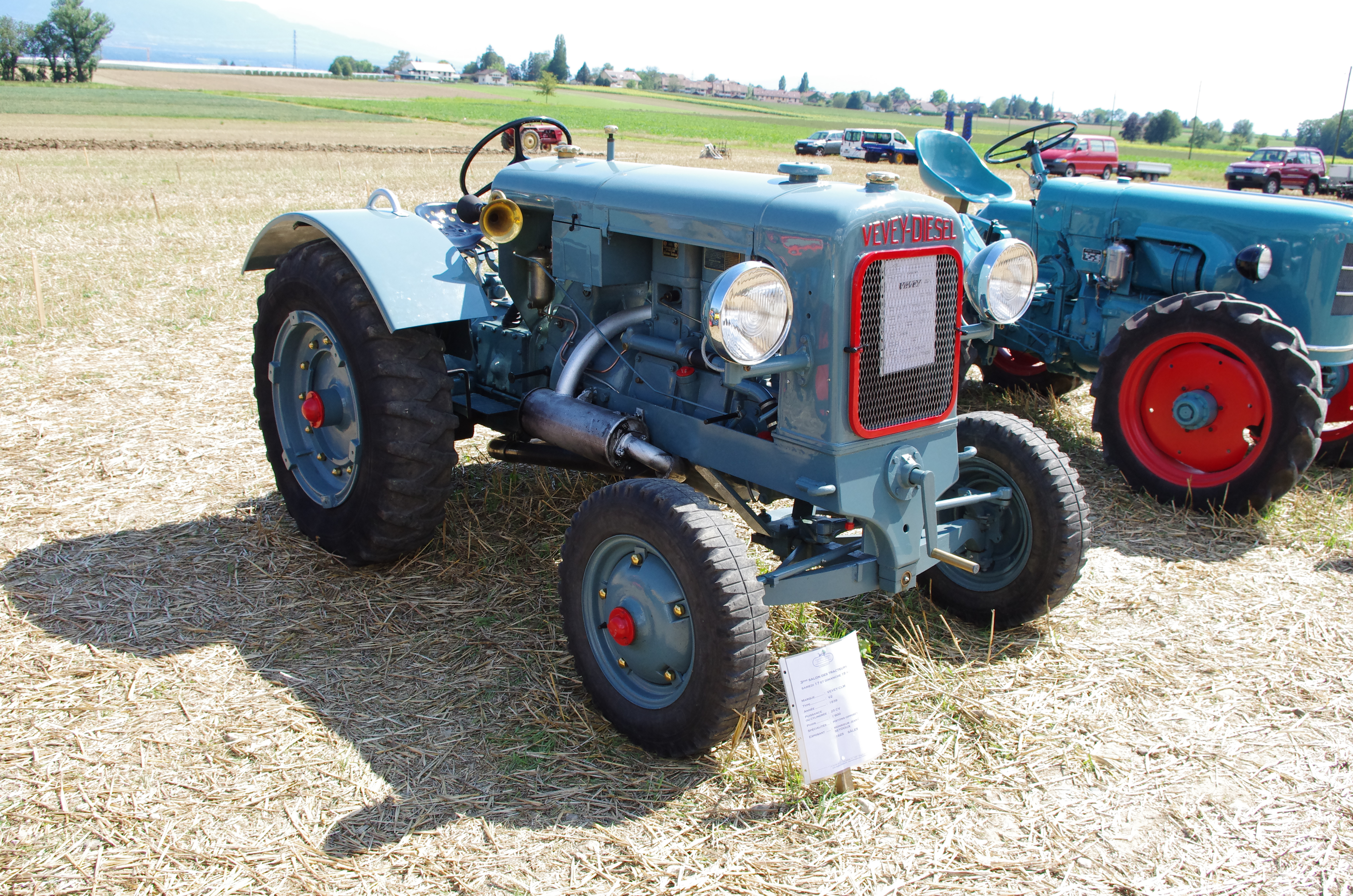
Traktor Vevey CLM V2 1939

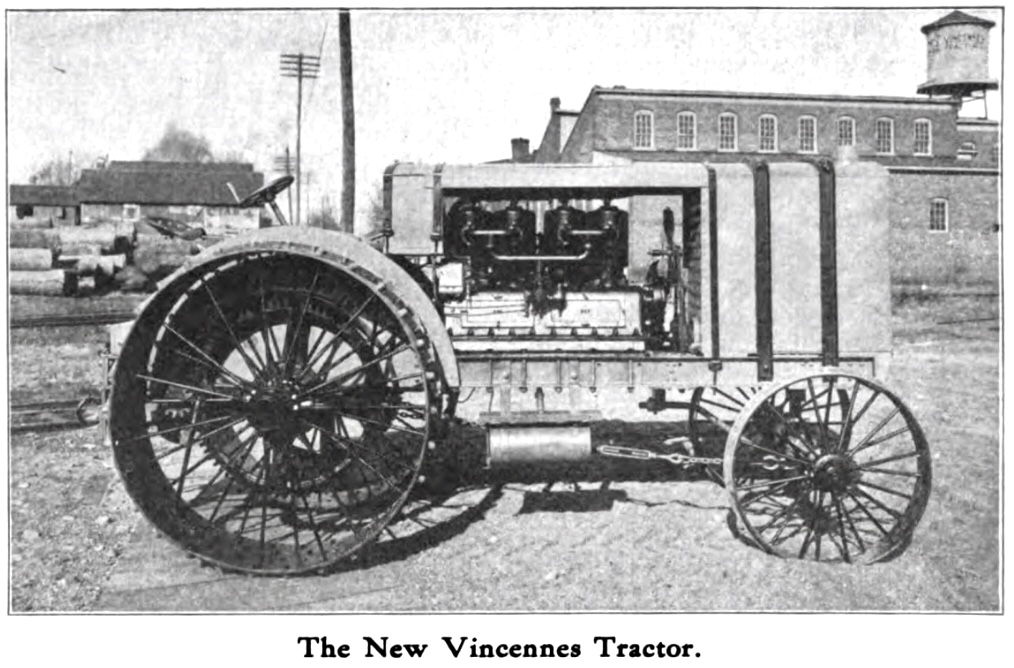
Vincennes Tractor (1913) 40 hp

- Vail-Rentschler (USA)
- Valmet (Finland) – now Valtra
- Valor (France)
- Valtra Valmet (Finland) – now Valtra
- Valtrac (France)
- Vandezande (Belgium)
- Vanguard (USA)
- Van Nostrand (USA)
- Variotrac (France)
- Vassalli (Argentina)
- Velie (USA)
- Vellino (Spain)
- Vendeuvre (France) – purchased by Allis-Chalmers
- Verion (Argentina)
- Vermorel (France)
- Versatile (Canada) – purchased by Ford, now owned by RostSelMash
- Vevey tractors (Switzerland) Vevey
- VeWeMa (Germany)
- Vick (Brazil)
- Victor (Japan)
- Victory (USA)
- Vierzon (France) – purchased by Case Vierzon
- Vincennes Tractor (USA)
- Vittorio Cantatore (Italy)
- Vladimir Factory (Russia)
- Volgograd Tractor Factory (Russia)
- Volvo (Sweden) – merged with Bolinder Munktells, now Valtra
- Volvo BM (Sweden) – now Volvo Construction Equipment
- Volvo BM Valmet (Harvesters) (Sweden) – now Valtra

== W ==
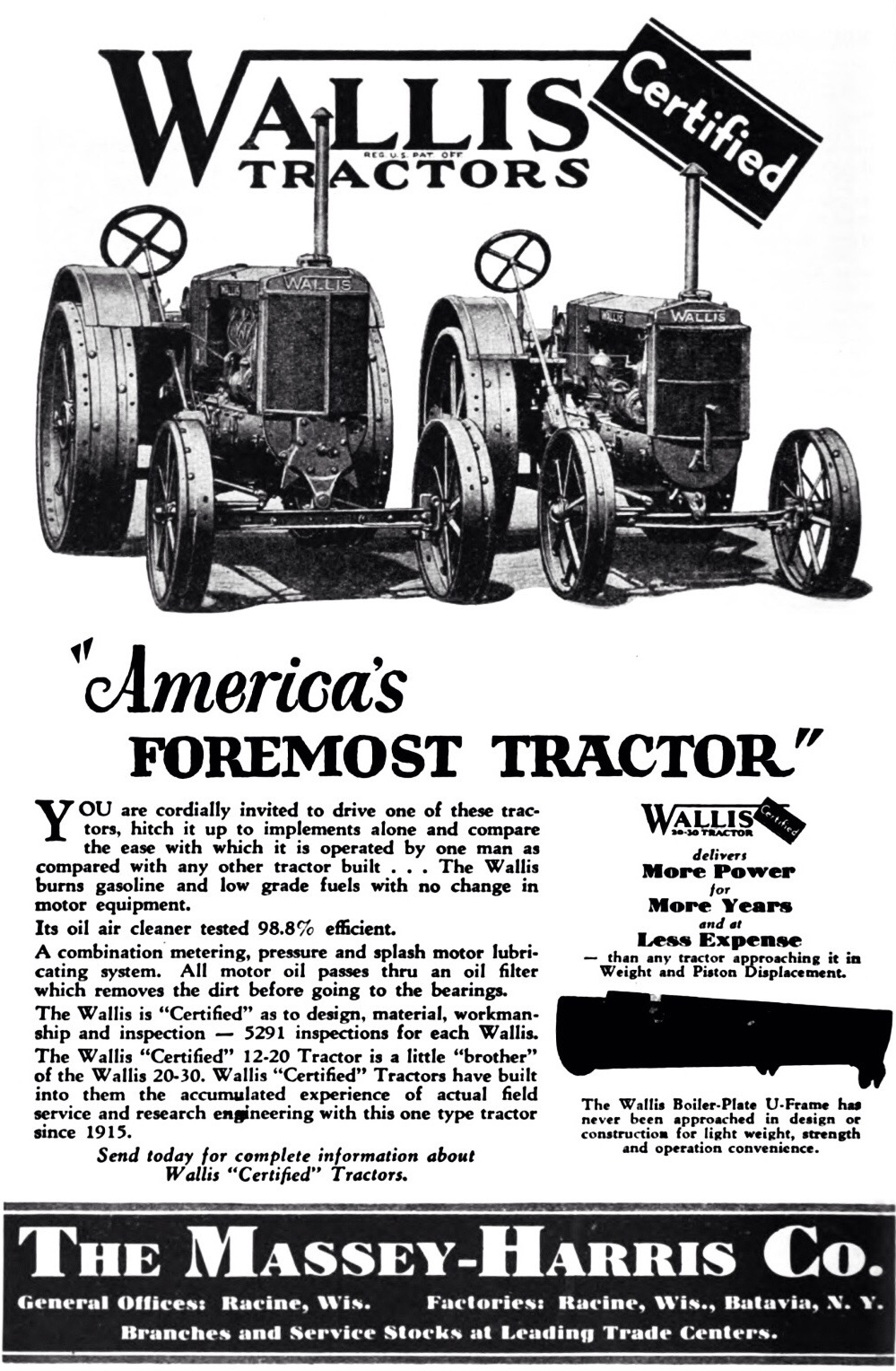
Wallis Certified 12-20 (1929-1935)

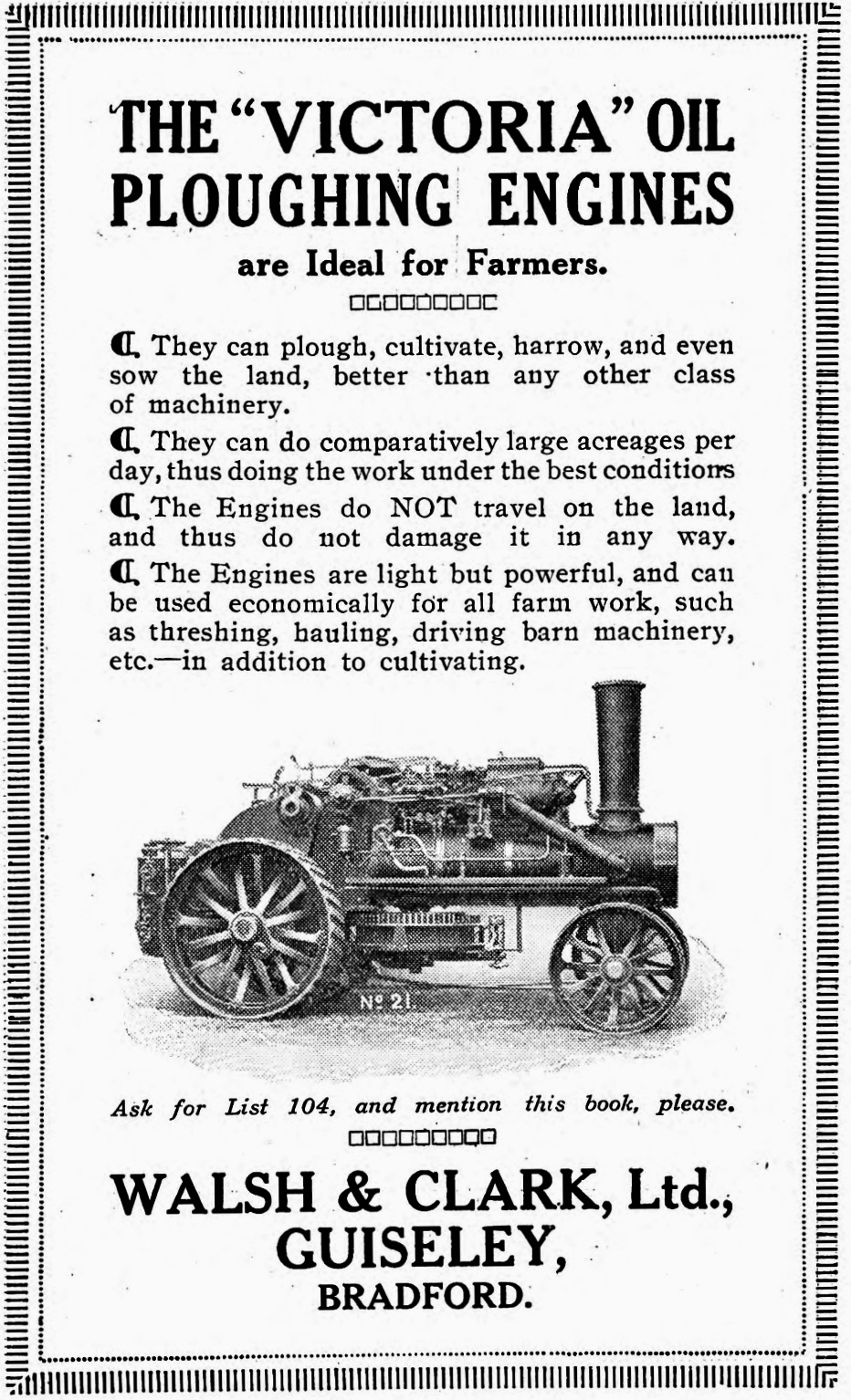
Walsh & Clark No. 21 (1918)

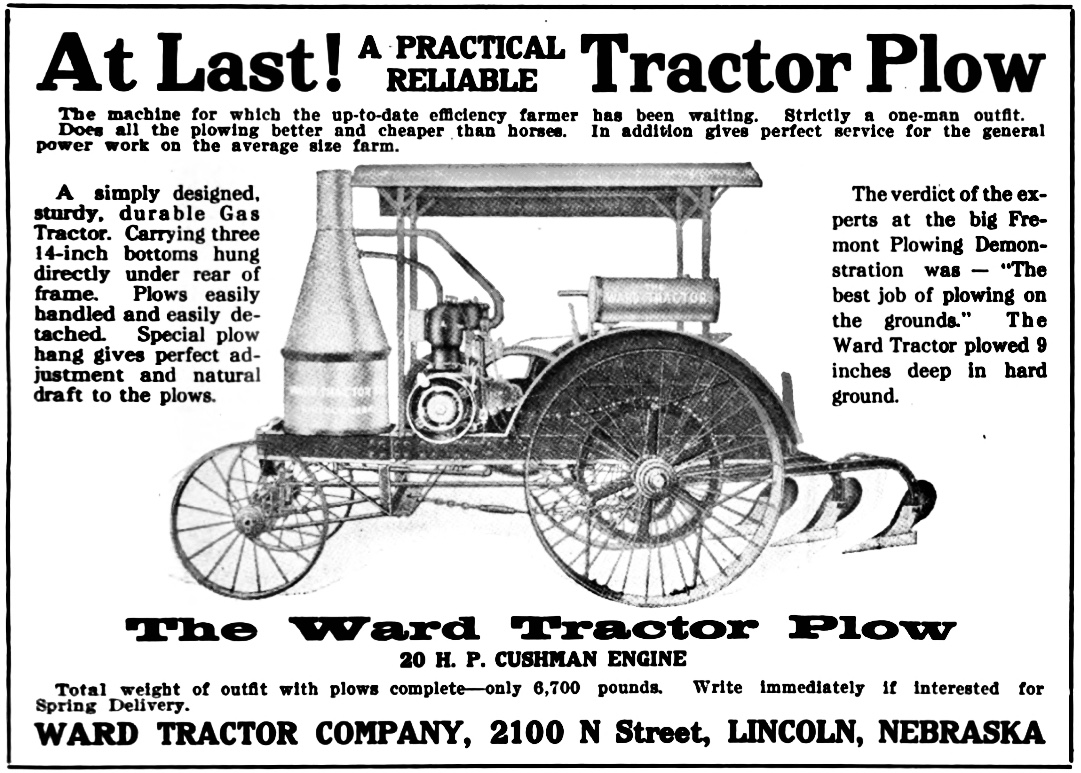
Ward (1912-1914)

Wayne advertisement (1918)

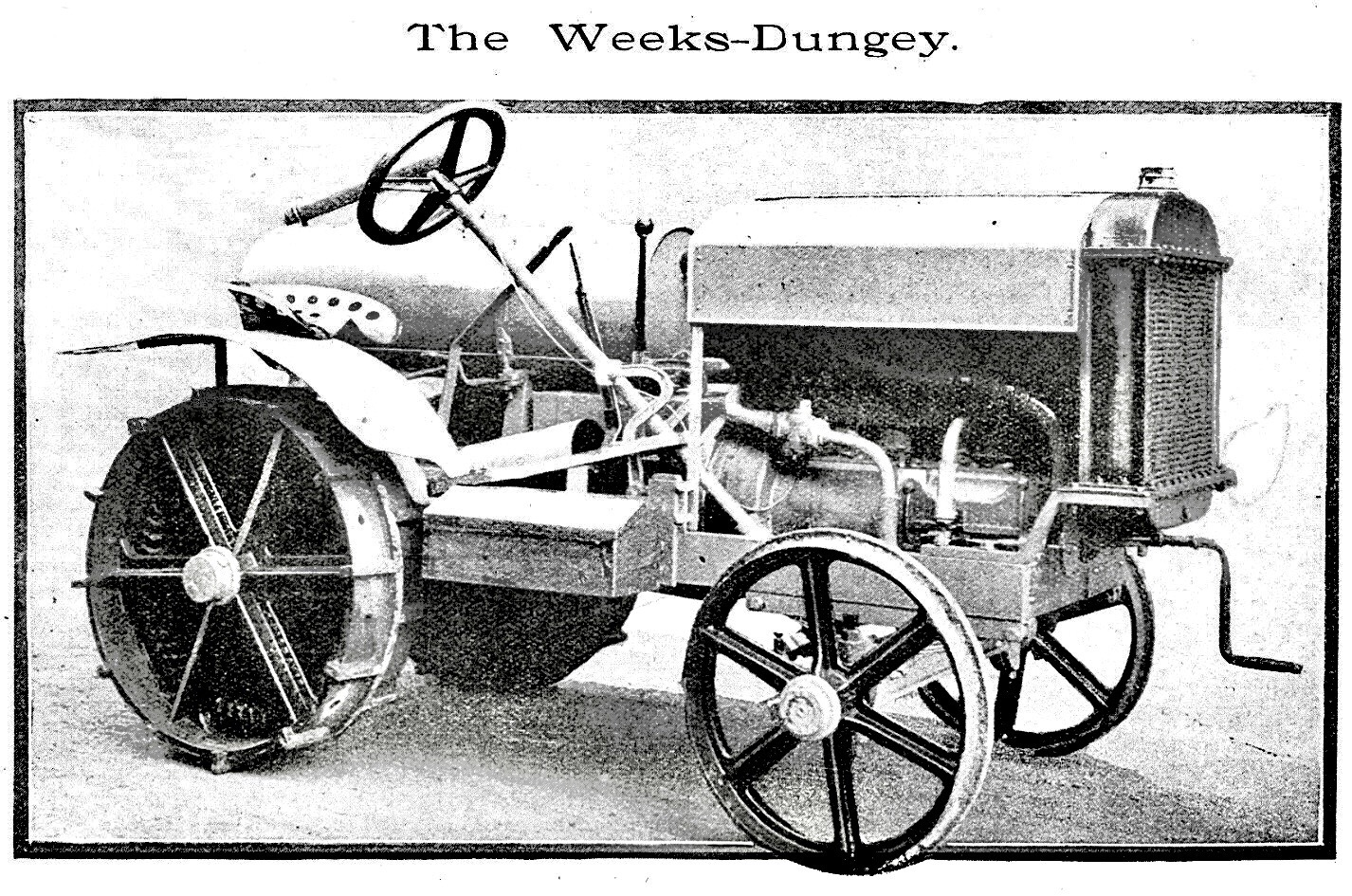
Weeks-Dungey „New Simplex“ (1918-1925)

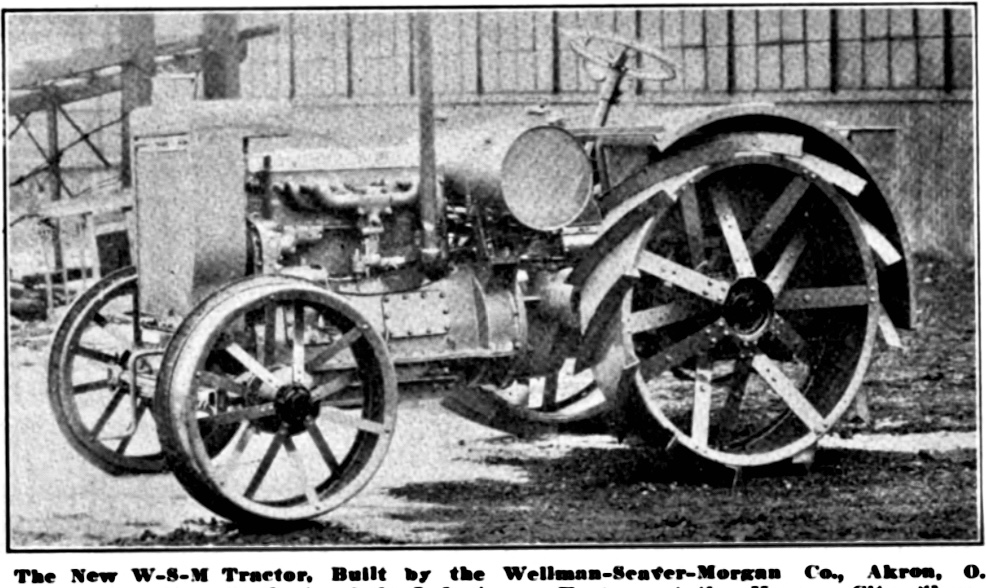
Wellman-Seaver-Morgan (1920-1922)

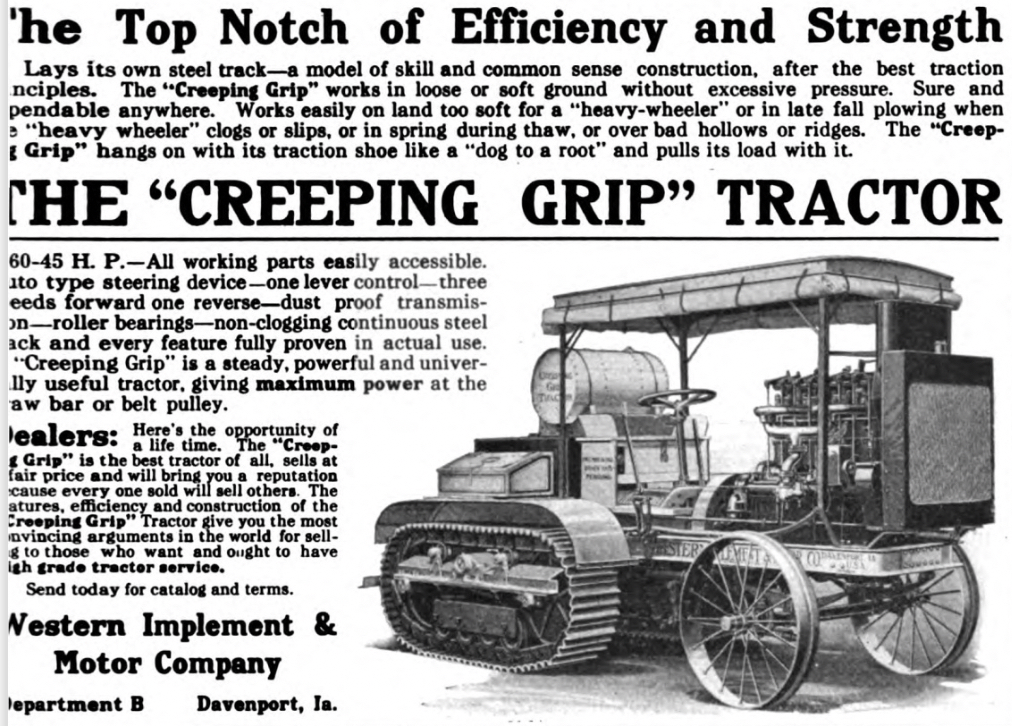
Western Implement & Motor Company (1912)

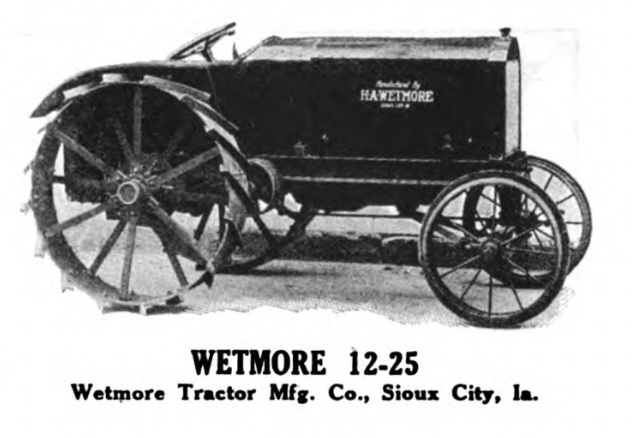
Wetmore 12-25

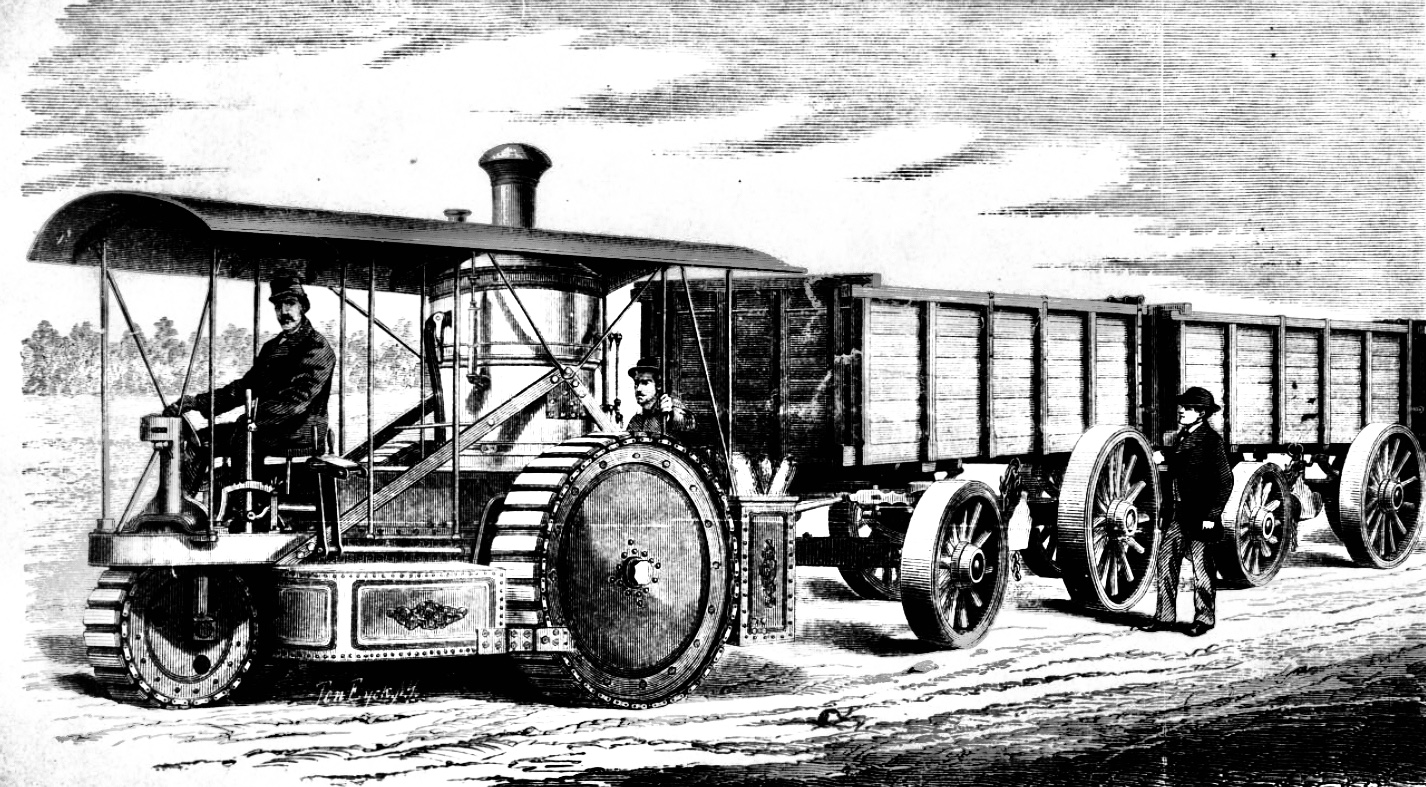
Williamson road steamer and steam plow (1873)

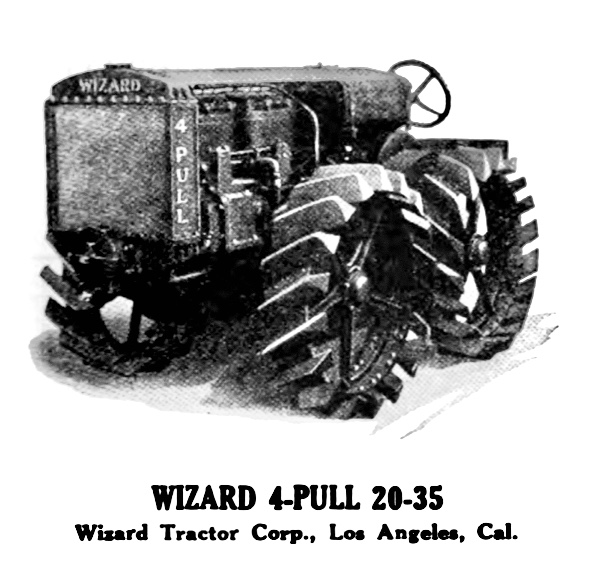
Wizard 4 pull 20-35

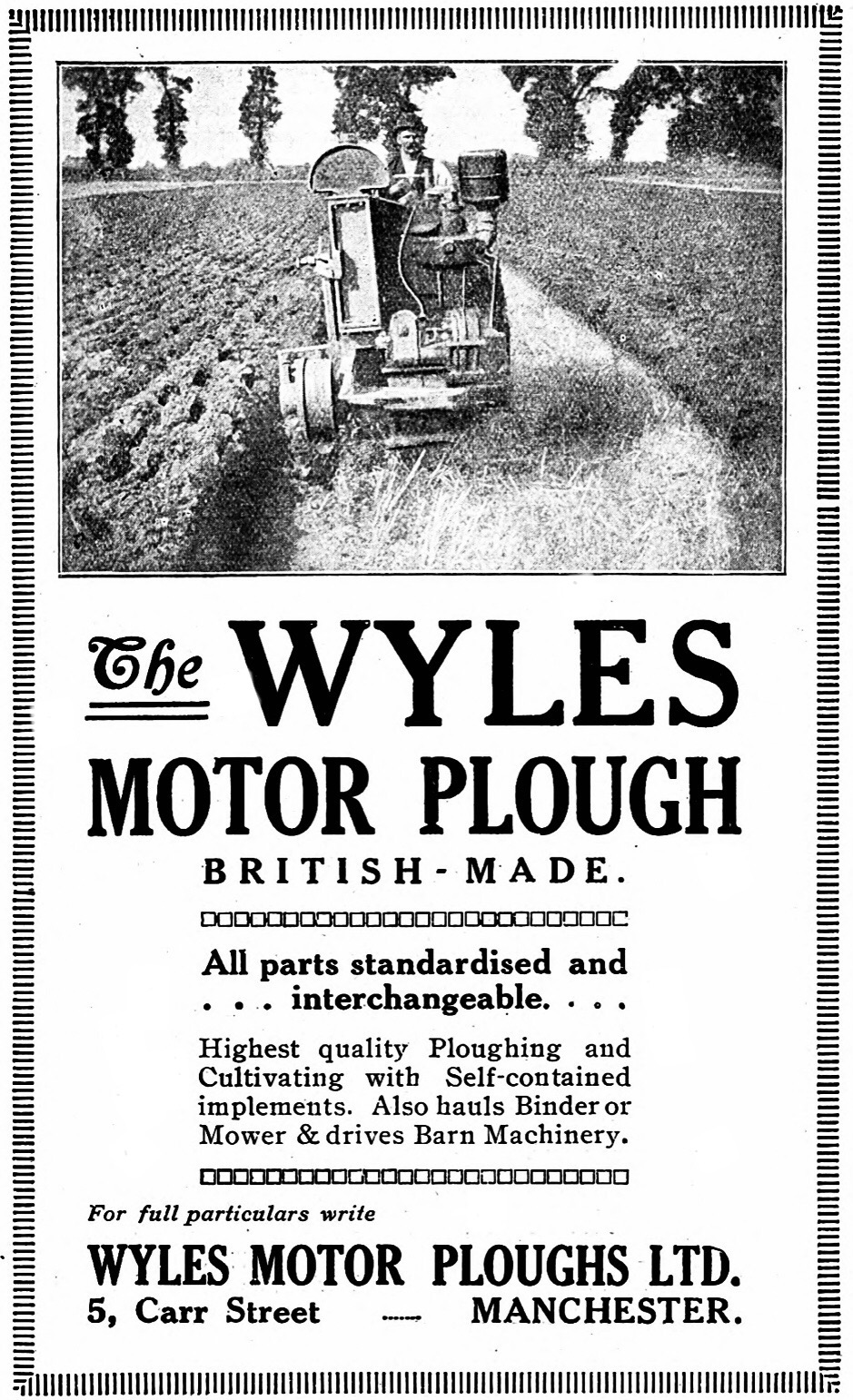
Wyles (1918)

- Wabash (USA)
- WACO (Austria)
- Wagner (USA)
- Wahl (Germany) Wahl
- Waite (USA)
- Wallis (USA) – purchased by Massey-Harris
- Wallis & Stevens (USA)
- Wallis & Steevens (England, UK) – steam tractor (note odd spelling of name)
- Walsh & Clark (England, UK)
- Waltanna (Australia)
- Walter Barrett (USA)
- Waterous Engine (USA) steam tractor
- Warchalowski (Austria) Warchalowski
- Ward (USA)
- Wards (USA)
- Warrior (Italy)
- Waterloo Boy (USA) – purchased by John Deere owner Deere & Company
- Waterloo (Canada)
- Wayne (USA)
- Weber (USA)
- Webfoot (USA)
- Weeks-Dungey (England, UK)
- Wellington (USA)
- Wellman-Seaver-Morgan (USA)
- Welte
- Werner (Germany)
- Wesseler (Germany)
- Western (USA)
- Western Implement & Motor Company (USA) became Bullock
- Western Tractor (USA)
- Westinghouse Company (USA) steam tractor
- Wetmore (USA)
- Wharton (USA)
- Wheel Ox (USA)
- White (USA) – purchased by AGCO Corporation
- White Oliver (USA)
- White George & Sons (USA) steam tractor
- Whiting-Bull (USA)
- Wichita Falls (USA)
- Wichita Tractor (USA)
- Wikov (Czech / USA) – certain products now manufactured by Wisconsin Engineering ()
- WildCat (USA)
- Williames (Australia)
- Williamson (USA)
- William Foster (England, UK) steam tractor
- Wills (England, UK)
- Wilson Tractor (USA)
- Winget (Australia)
- Winget (United Kingdom) – noted for site dumpers and plant (was part of Babcock & Wilcox for a time)
- Winnebago (USA)
- Winslow (USA)
- Wisconsin (USA) Wisconsin
- Wizard (USA)
- Wladimirski Traktorny Sawod (Russia) Wladimirski Traktorny Sawod
- Wm Allchin (England, UK)
- Wolf (USA)
- Wolf (Germany) Wolf
- Wolverine (USA)
- Woodburn (USA) Woodburn
- Wood Brothers (USA) steam tractor
- Wood S.W. and Sons (USA) steam tractor
- Wood, Taber & Morse (USA) steam tractor
- Woods & Copeland (USA) – purchased by Rome
- Woody
- World Harvester (USA)
- Worthington Mower Company (USA) Worthington Pump and Machinery Corporation
- Wright (South Africa)
- Wyles (England, UK)

== X ==
- Xiamen Xiagong Group (China)
  - Sahm
  - Xiagong
- Xinhu (China)

== Y ==
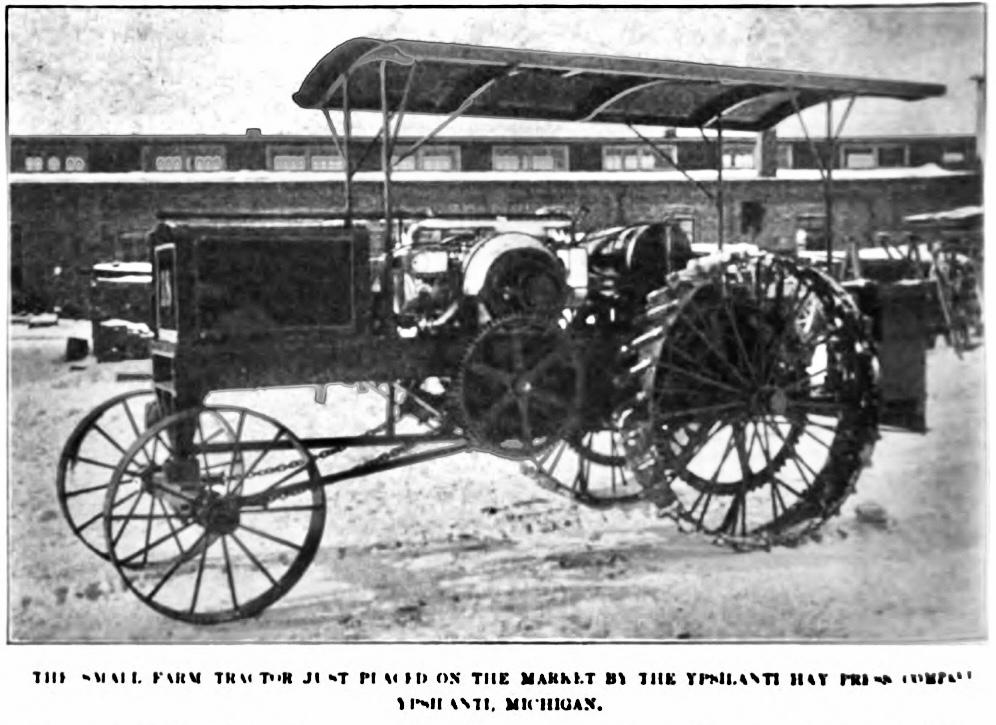
Ypsilanti (1912)

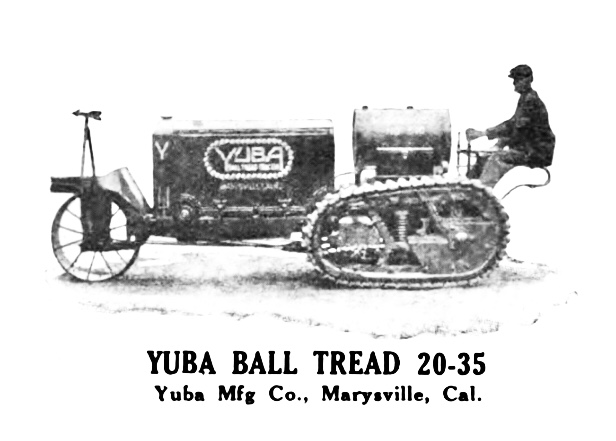
Yuba Ball Tread 20-35

- Yankee (USA)
- Yewers (Australia)
- Ypsilanti (USA)
- Yuba (USA)

== Z ==
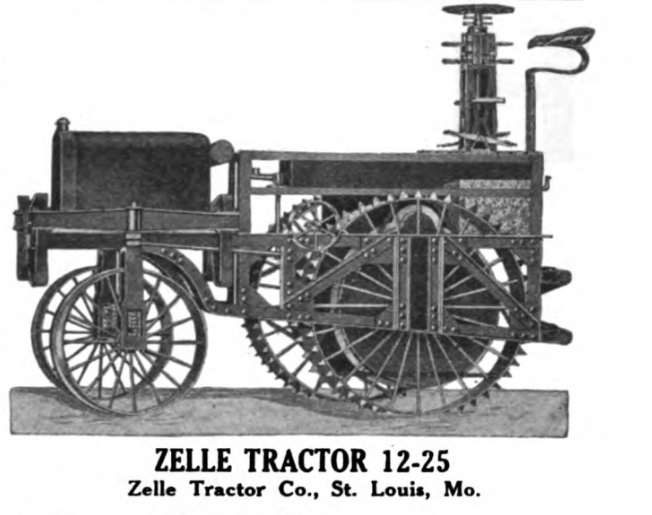
Zelle Tractor 12-25

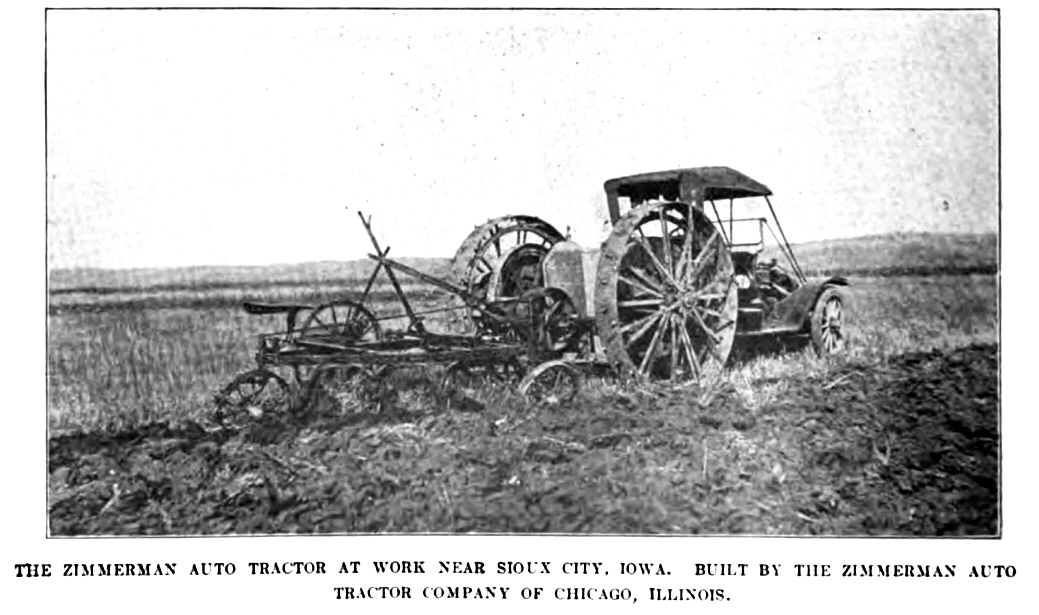
Zimmerman (1913)

- Zadrugar (Yugoslavia)
- Zanello (Argentina)
- Zanello (Maquinarias) (Argentina) – now Zanello (CMZ)
- Zanello (Pauny) (Argentina) – now Pauny Rino
- Zanker (Germany)
- Zaporozhec (Ukraine)
- Zebra (USA)
- Zelle (USA)
- Zetor (Czech) – with Zetor Crystal built in Poland by Ursus
- Zettelmeyer (Germany) Zettelmeyer
- Zimmerman (USA)
- ZTS (Slovak)

== See also ==
- List of current tractor manufacturers
- List of traction engine and steam tractor manufacturers
- Agricultural engineering
- List of agricultural machinery
- Mechanised agriculture
