= Field Marshall =

British farm tractor brand

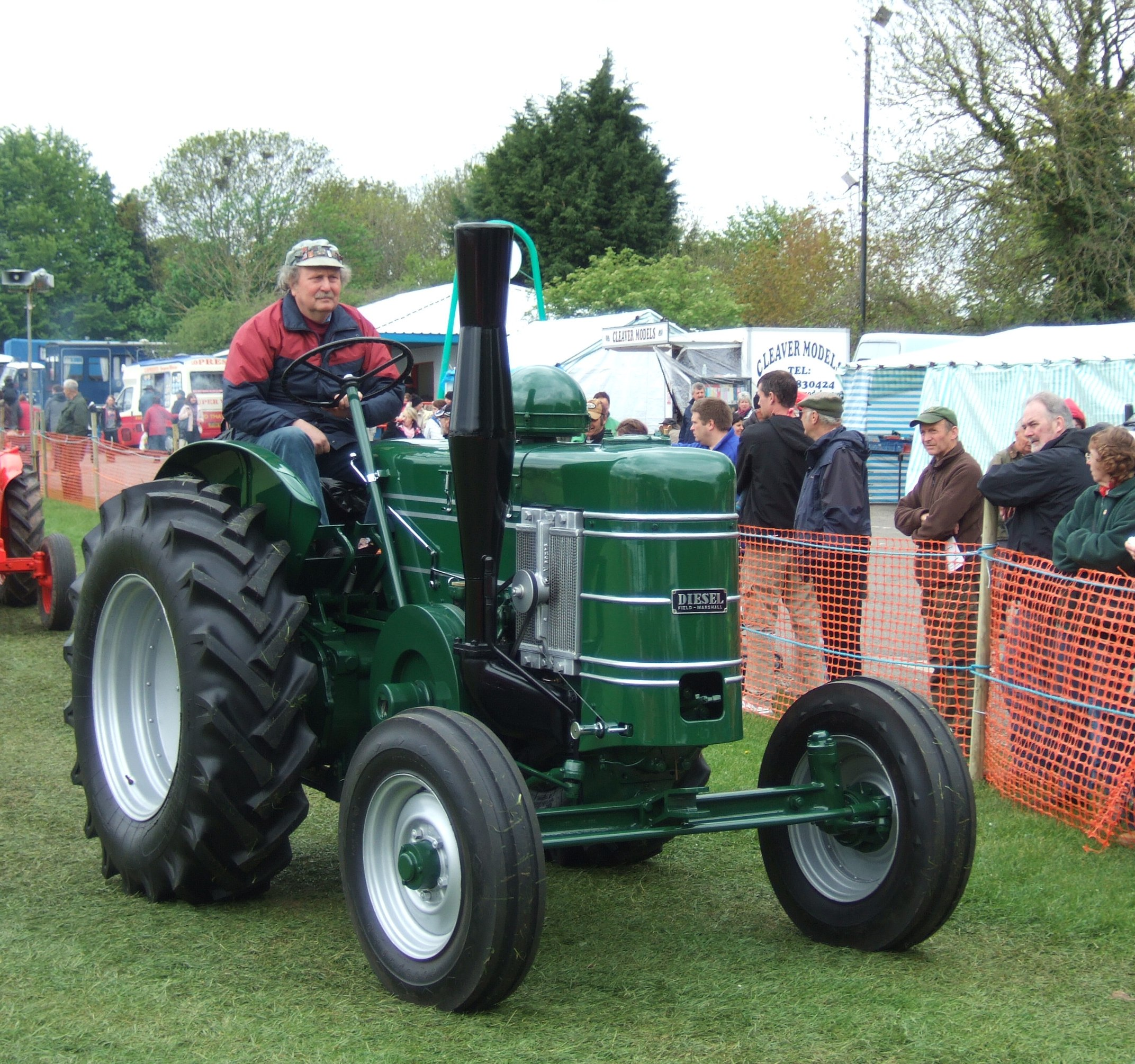
Field-Marshall

Field-Marshall was a brand of farm tractor which was manufactured by Marshall, Sons & Co. of Gainsborough, Lincolnshire in the United Kingdom.

Field-Marshalls were in production from 1945 to 1957. However, the first single-cylinder Marshall came into production in 1930.

== Earlier Marshall tractor line ==
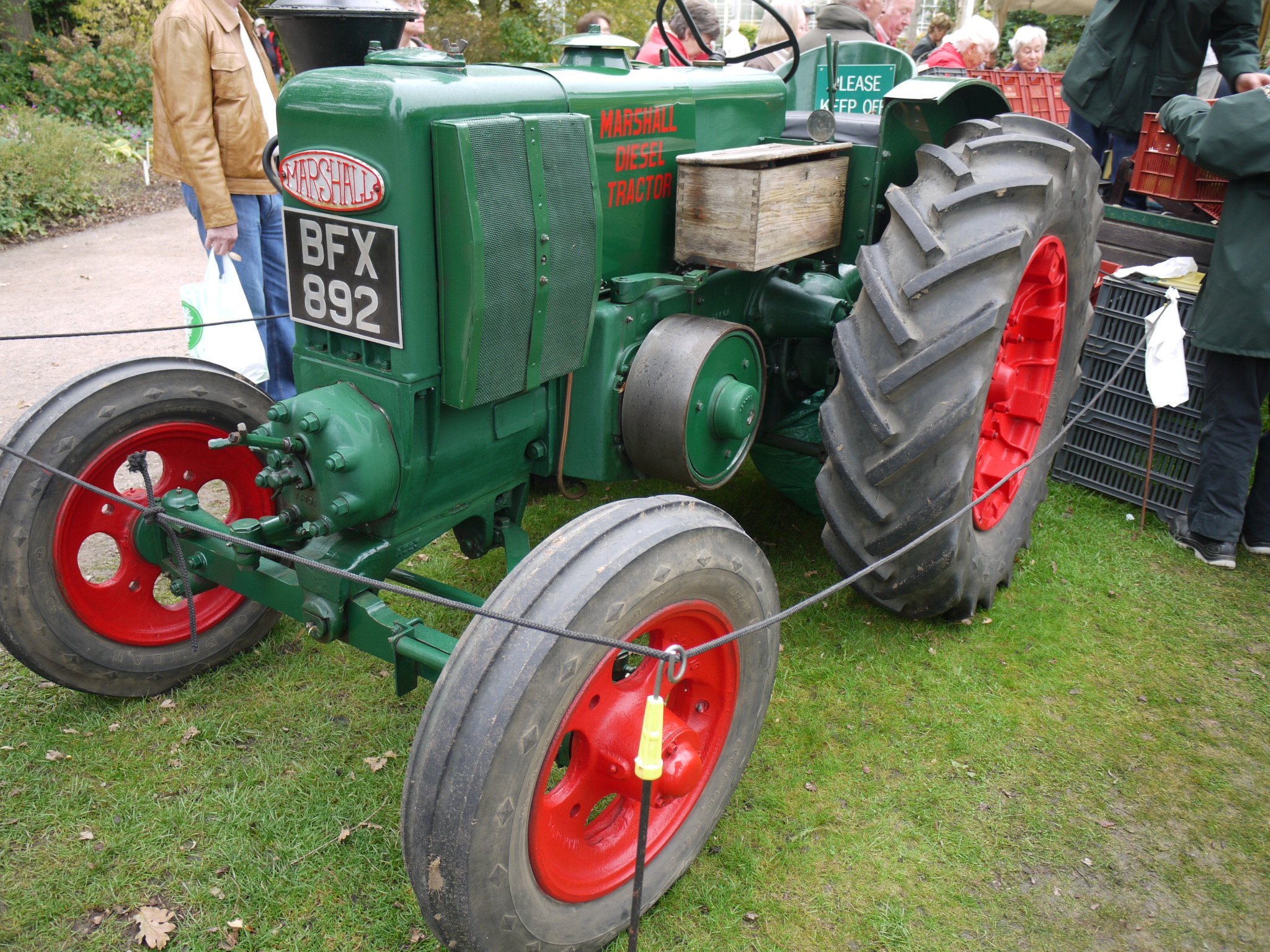
1942 Marshall Type M tractor

The first single-cylinder Marshall tractor to be introduced was the Marshall 15/30 in 1930. It had a 8-inch (200 mm) bore with a 10-inch (250 mm) stroke (= 8.237 litres) and the maximum speed was 550 r.p.m., or 9.1666 revolutions per second. In 1932 the 15/30 was upgraded to become the Marshall 18/30. This model featured the same bore and stroke dimensions but the maximum r.p.m. was increased and the tractor's transmission was heavily modified.

The next single-cylinder Marshall to be introduced was the Marshall 12/20 in 1935. This tractor was of a completely new design, with a 6-inch (150 mm)-inch bore and a 9-inch (230 mm) stroke (= 4.17 litres). There were many smaller modifications such as a redesigned injection pump and cylinder head.

In 1938 the 12/20 model was redesigned and the model coding was changed so that the new model became the Marshall Model "M" tractor. During World War II tractor production was reduced greatly due to Marshall's factory capacity being engaged on war work. However, after the war, in 1945, Marshall's of Gainsborough introduced the improved diesel-powered tractor they had developed as the "Field-Marshall".

== Field-Marshall tractor ==
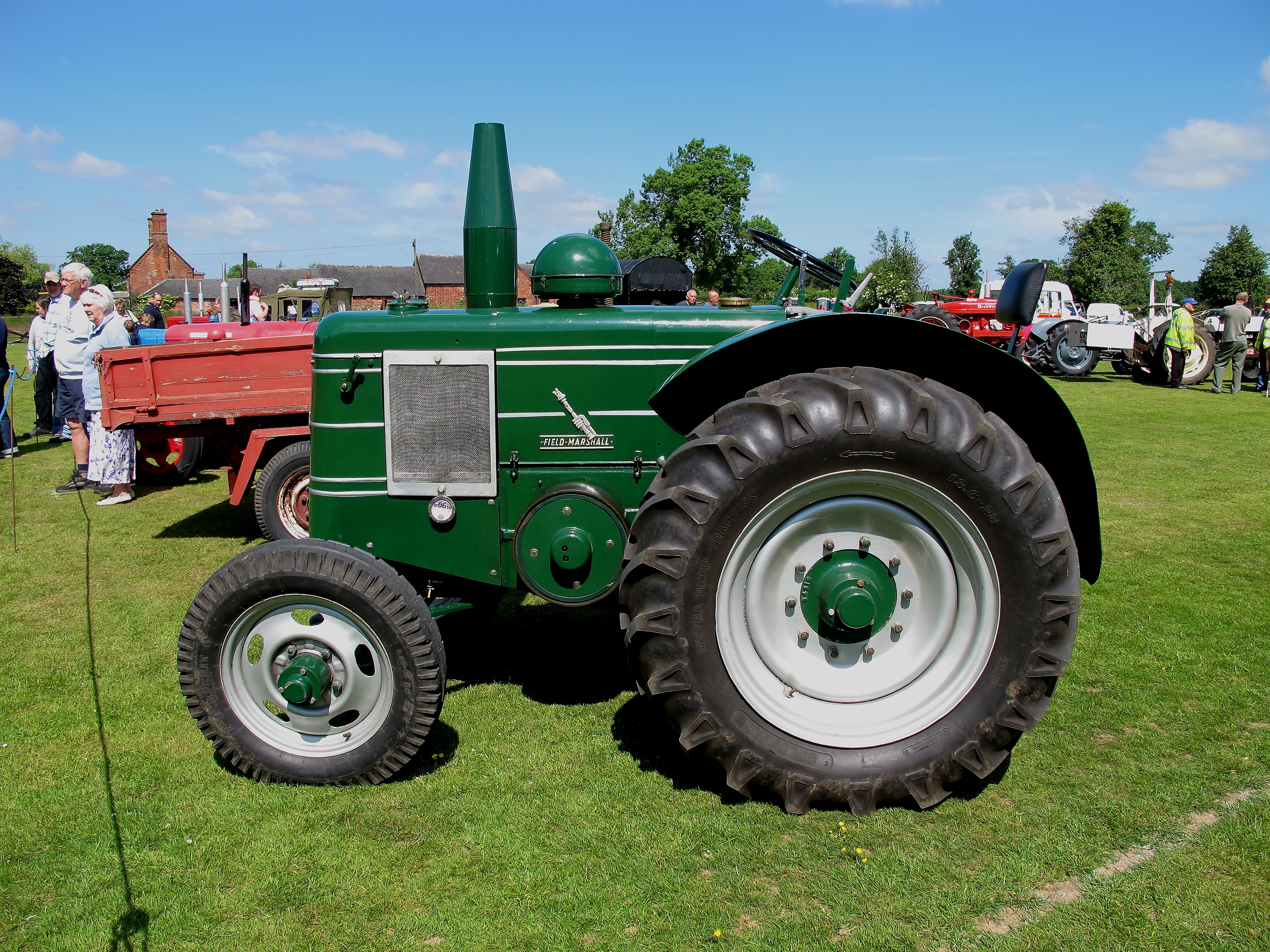
1950 Model

The Field-Marshall and its Track Marshall tracked stable-mate (Marshall-engined Fowler VF and VFA), were distinctive because of the use of a single-cylinder two-stroke diesel engine (of about 6-litre capacity) coupled to a very large flywheel, whereas tractors such as the Fordson N used a multi-cylinder engine. This single-cylinder design was quite common in Europe at the time, the Lanz Bulldog being another example. The Lanz, though, used a hot bulb engine.

=== Field-Marshall timeline ===
- Field-Marshall Series 1 - 1945–1947 - 6 mph and 9 mph gearboxes available - Mark I & II variants
- Field-Marshall Series 2 - 1947–1949 - 6 mph and 9 mph gearboxes available - Mark I & II variants
- Field-Marshall Series 3 - 1949–1953 - 12 mph high and low gearbox
- Field-Marshall Series 3A - 1953–1957 - 12 mph high and low gearbox

=== Starting ===
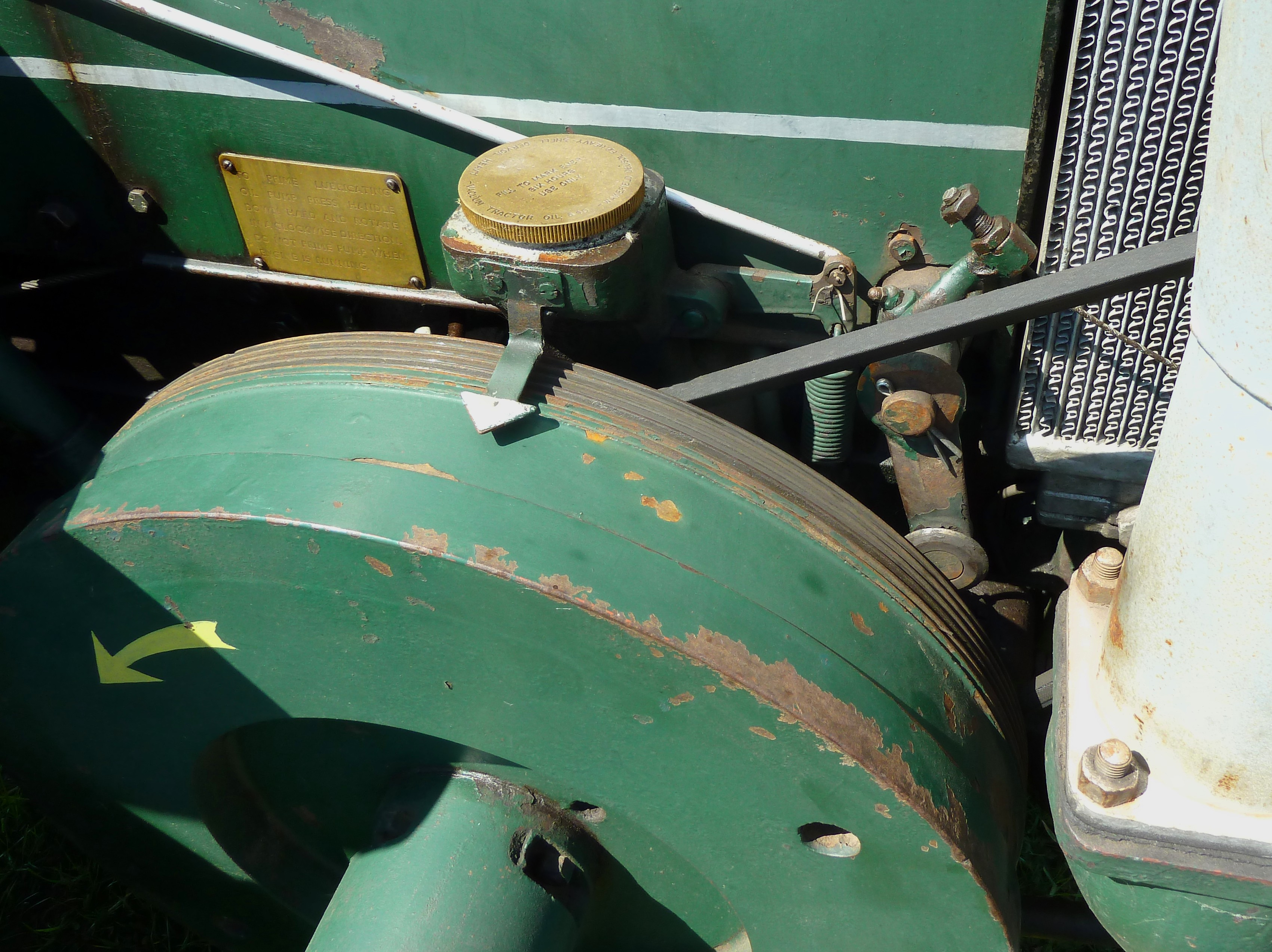
Flywheel and decompressor lever

To start the Marshall a smouldering piece of special paper, containing saltpetre, is inserted into the cylinder head by means of the special screw-in holder in the cylinder head (this smouldering paper acts as a glow plug).

The engine is then turned over with a starting handle placed in the starting dog on the flywheel. This is aided by the decompression valve, which decompresses the engine and makes it easier to turn over to allow the flywheel to gain speed and momentum to turn the engine through compression, and get the engine to fire. A spiral groove on the perimeter of the flywheel carries a wheel on the decompressor mechanism and is used to determine the number of revolutions before the decompressor disengages. This is generally up to three revolutions, but can be anything up to six revolutions. Depending on the condition of individual tractors, it may need considerable physical exertion to start a Marshall.

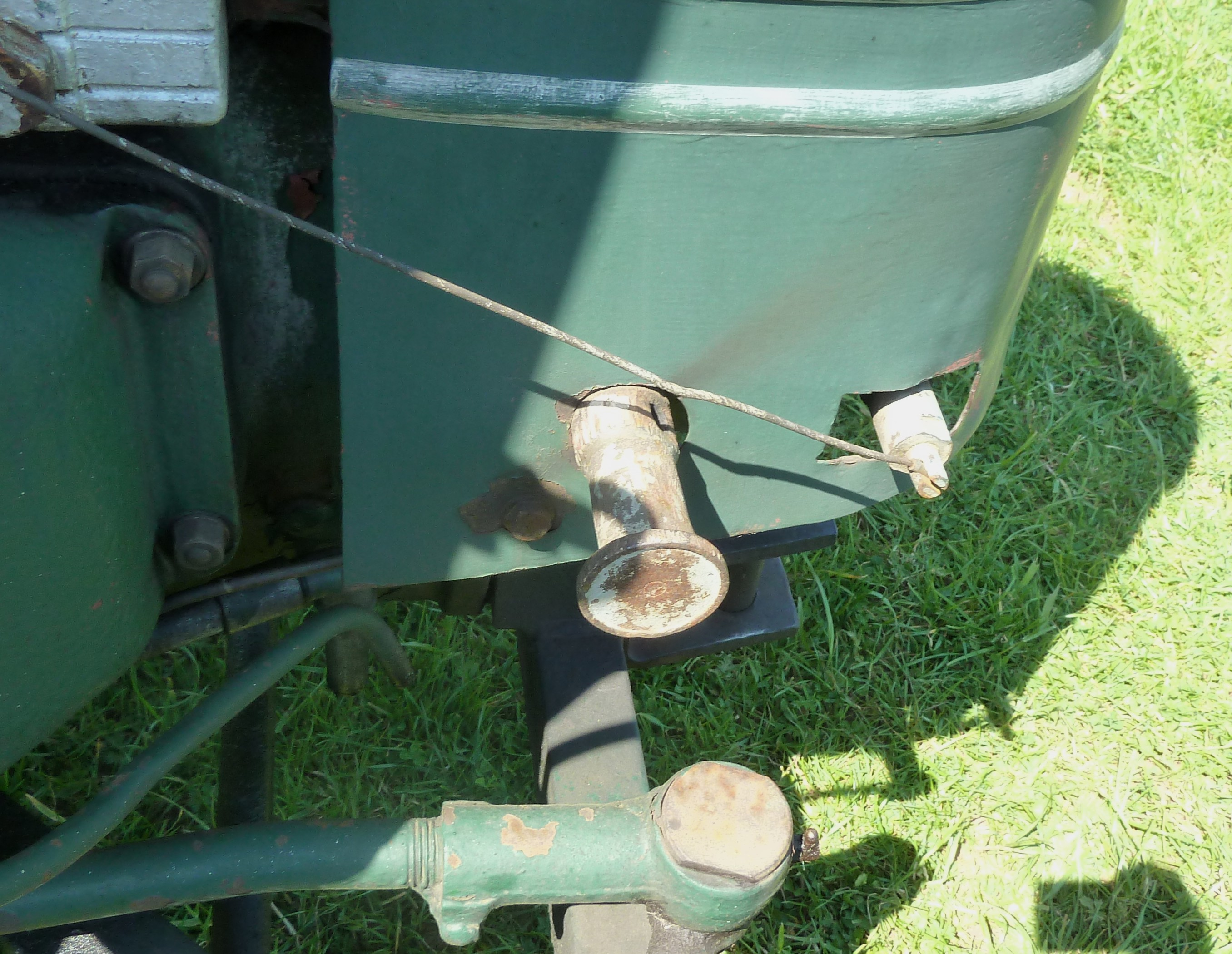
Starting cartridge breech

A cartridge starting system is also fitted to the tractor. A shotgun type blank cartridge is loaded into a breech on the engine's intake system. The smouldering paper is placed in the cylinder head, and the cartridge is fired by tapping the base of the protruding firing pin with a hammer. This puts a charge into the bore, sending the piston through its stroke, bursting into life. This method, however, deposits carbon which often causes jamming of the decompression valve if cartridges are regularly used. It also puts significantly more strain on the engine.

Later versions of the Field-Marshall had more sophisticated starting systems available; electric starters were optional on the Series 3As.

=== Applications ===
The Field-Marshall tractors were commonly used to pull agricultural machinery such as threshing machines from site to site. Once in place, the Field-Marshall would be used as the powerplant for the threshing machine, the tractor's belt pulley coupled by a large flat drive belt to the threshing machine's pulley.

Field-Marshalls with tracks were produced under the Fowler brand name, being converted in the Fowler factory at Leeds. The first were designated the "Fowler VF", later ones being "VFA"s.

== Mergers and subsequent demise ==
Later the two firms would be drawn together and a large number of complicated take-overs by such firms as British Leyland led to the wheeled tractor concern being owned by Bentall Simplex in the early 80s. They brought with the company the whole Leyland wheeled tractor range which had previously been built at Bathgate (which itself had started out as a Nuffield Universal tractor site). These were then badge engineered into the 'Marshall' range. The company even designed and built some totally new tractors but unfortunately due to the high costs and consequently high asking price, the tractors didn't sell well and the company slipped under. In the end only the Track Marshall concern was left, although even this has since gone bankrupt.

In the 1970s about 700 "Track Marshall" tractors were imported into Australia and fitted with dozer blades. These machines were powered by a 4-cylinder Perkins diesel engine and were considered very reliable in their time. They steered through an unusual wet band brake system through a differential gear system. This is known as a 'controlled differential'. It is impossible to stop one track, you pull the brake lever, the track slows down, the other track speeds up. This type of steering system absorbs a lot of power when turning. Several are still in use around the Northern Rivers area of NSW, Australia.
