= Marshall, Sons & Co. =

British agricultural machinery manufacturer

Marshall, Sons & Co
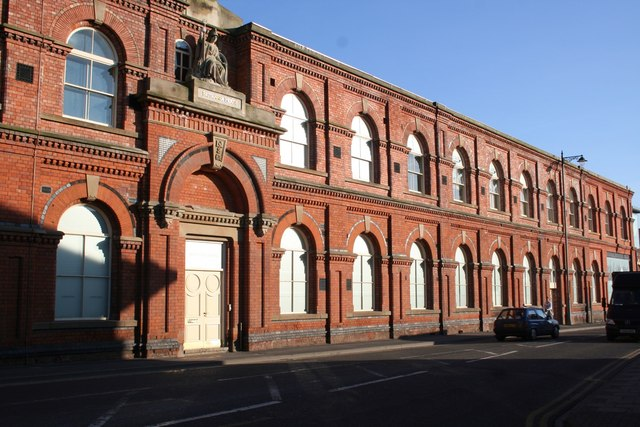
- Former Britannia Iron Works buildings on Beaumont Street, Gainsborough, 2008
- Type: Private
- Industry: Agricultural engineering
- Founded: 1848
- Defunct: 1947
- Fate: Taken over
- Successor: Marshall Fowler Ltd; British Leyland
- Headquarters: Gainsborough, Lincolnshire
- Products: Steam engines, Portable engines, Threshing machines, Tractors

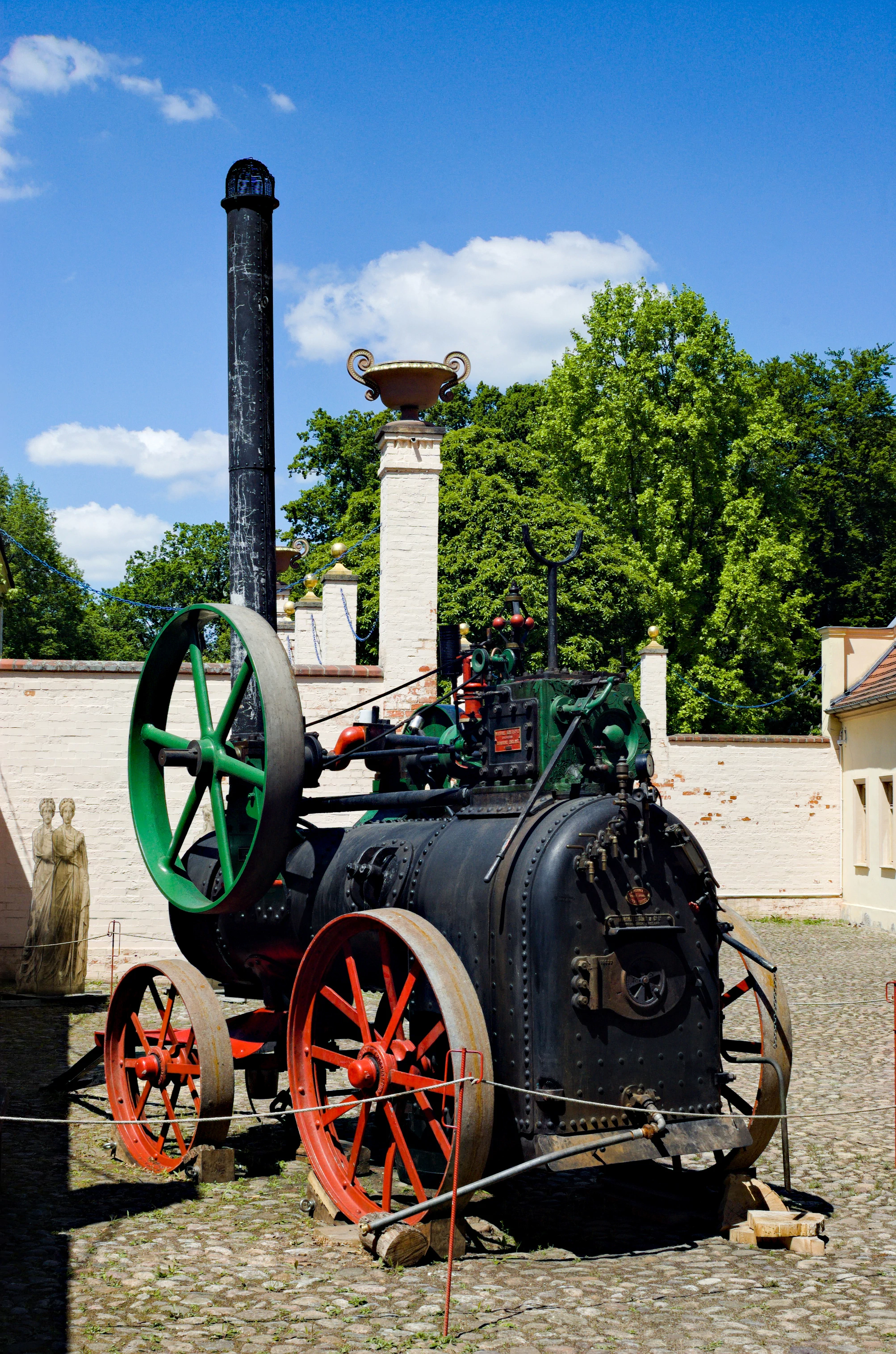
Portable Marshall steam engine Angelika in Cottbus

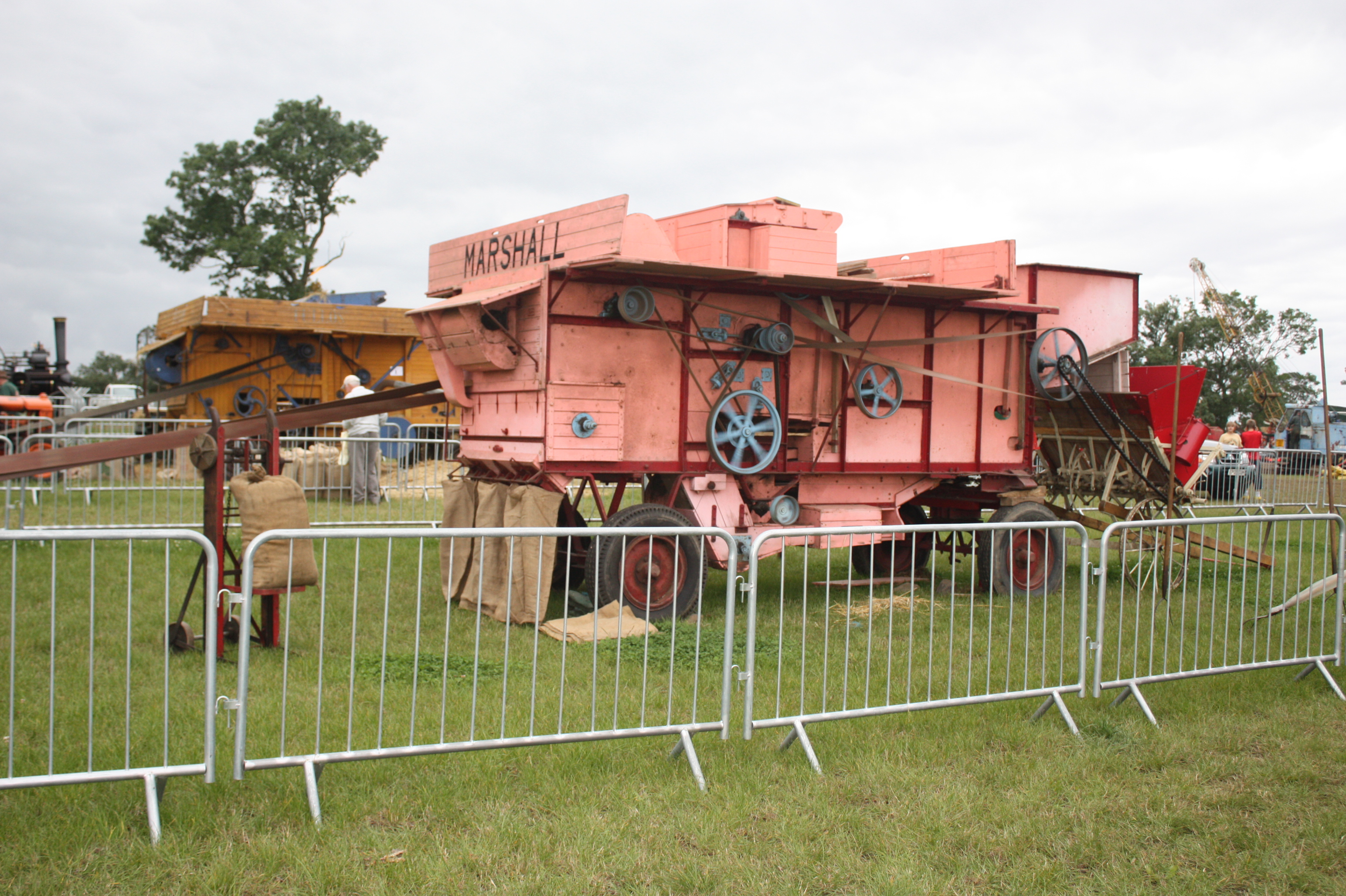
A Marshall Threshing machine being demonstrated at the Holcot Steam Rally 2008 in Northamptonshire, with a Massey-Harris baler attached (rhs)

Marshall Sons & Co traction engine

Marshall Sons & Co traction engine powered timber saw recorded at Fawley Hill, 18 May 2013.

Marshall, Sons & Co. was a British agricultural machinery manufacturer founded in 1848. The company was based in the Britannia Iron Works, Gainsborough, Lincolnshire. Early production was of steam engines and agricultural machinery. Later production included diesel tractors such as the Field Marshall, Track Marshall and former Leyland wheeled tractors.

== History ==
In 1848 William Marshall bought the premises of millwright William Garland and Son at Back Street Foundry in Gainsborough. William began business here, before purchasing the first acre and a half of land on Beaumont Street some years later. This was the beginning of the Britannia Iron Works. In 1857 his son James Marshall become a partner and the company name was changed to William Marshall and Son. In 1861 another son, Henry Dickinson Marshall, became a partner. William Marshall died in 1861 and his two sons continued the business. It was incorporated as a limited company in 1862.

Before WW1 the workforce was over 4000, but by the mid 1930s this had fallen to less than 1000, and in October 1935 Thomas W. Ward Ltd purchased the entire assets of Marshall, Sons & Co Ltd. In January 1947 it was reported that Marshall had acquired John Fowler and Company (Leeds) Ltd. which was of similar size and had a highly mechanised foundry at Sprotbrough which was built in 1943 as part of the war effort to make track links for tanks. The two companies merged their activities to some extent and initially products were marketed under the Fowler-Marshall brand, but John Fowler and Co (Leeds) retained its identity and operated as a subsidiary company. By 1970 the two companies had been combined to form Marshall Fowler Limited.

In 1974 the Fowler works in Leeds was closed, and all activity concentrated at Gainsborough, and in 1975 T.W.Ward Ltd sold Marshall to British Leyland, who merged it with their Aveling-Barford products to form Aveling-Marshall, who made tracked crawlers and wheeled loaders. However British Leyland decided to sell off non-core businesses in 1979 and the Marshall part of British Leyland Special Products Division was sold to businessman Charles Nickerson, owner of Marshall, Son & Co. He produced crawlers under the Track Marshall Ltd name, and in 1982 acquired the British Leyland tractor business. He moved tractor assembly from Bathgate, Scotland to Gainsborough where he built tractors under the Marshall name. This deal was conditional on him sourcing engine and other parts from the Bathgate factory for a minimum of 3 years.

In 1986 the Marshall company changed ownership before becoming owned by Bentall Simplex who moved tractor production from Gainsborough to their 25 acre factory at Scunthorpe. Under Bentall Simplex Marshall tractors were increasingly fitted with Perkins engines. By 1989 a wide range of tractors were in production from 22hp to 125hp, plus they had a large spare parts business for the 120,000 Nuffield, Leyland and Marshall tractors around the world. This wide range of tractors largely came about by importing Steyr tractors and marketing them under the Marshall brand. The Track Marshall business was also sold in 1986, to a former sales director, Hubert Flatters. He saved the business but unfortunately died in 1987. The business was sold by his family in 1990 to Tom Walkinshaw's TWR Group, who focussed on the production of the rubber-tracked TM200. Track Marshall production continued until 1998, after which the business was sold to the Sales Director Tony Leighton and thereafter the company focussed on the supply of spare parts.

There is now a shopping centre (Marshall's Yard) standing on part of the former Britannia Iron Works site.

== Products ==
=== Steam engines ===
Marshall's produced large numbers of steam traction engines, steam rollers, portable engines and agricultural machinery of all types. Among British manufactures, Marshall were second only to Aveling and Porter in terms of the number of steam rollers they produced. In 1923 the company started selling tandem rollers.

Marshall also made at least one standard gauge railway locomotive, with works number 6402 being supplied to Pepper & Son Ltd chalk pits at Amberley in Sussex in 1878. It was scrapped in 1959.

=== Tractors ===
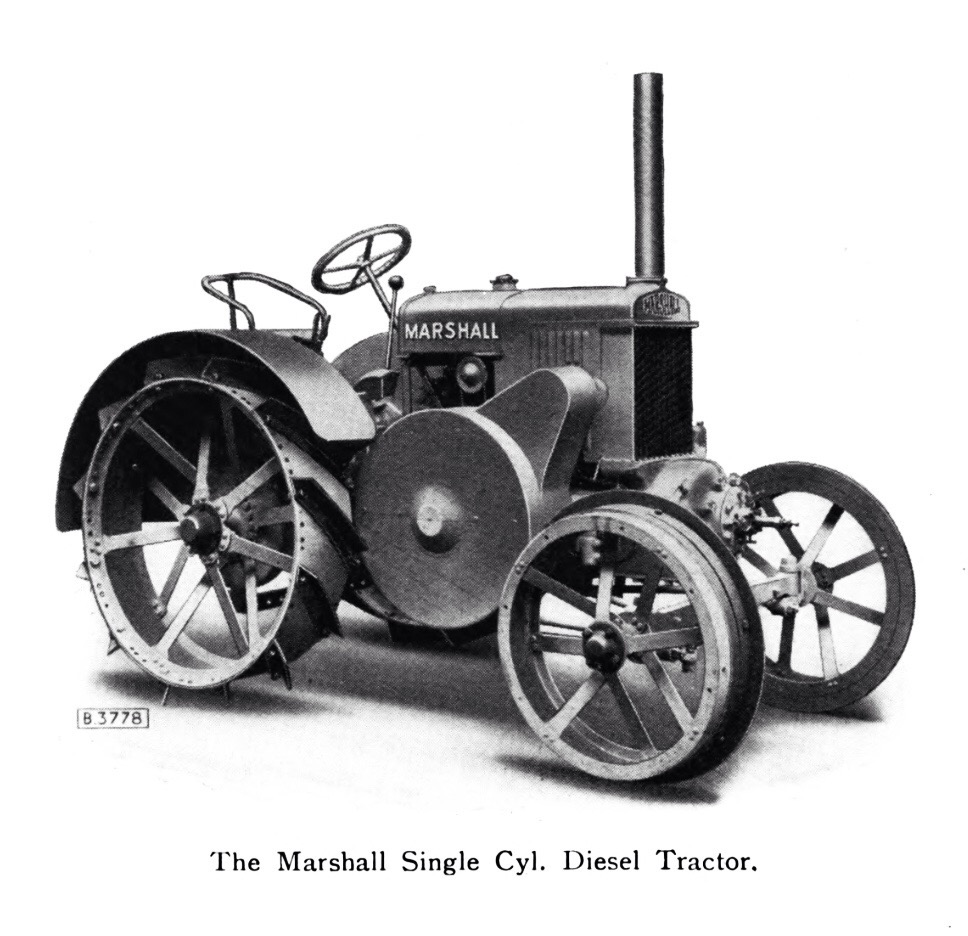
Marshall 16-24 (1928-1933)

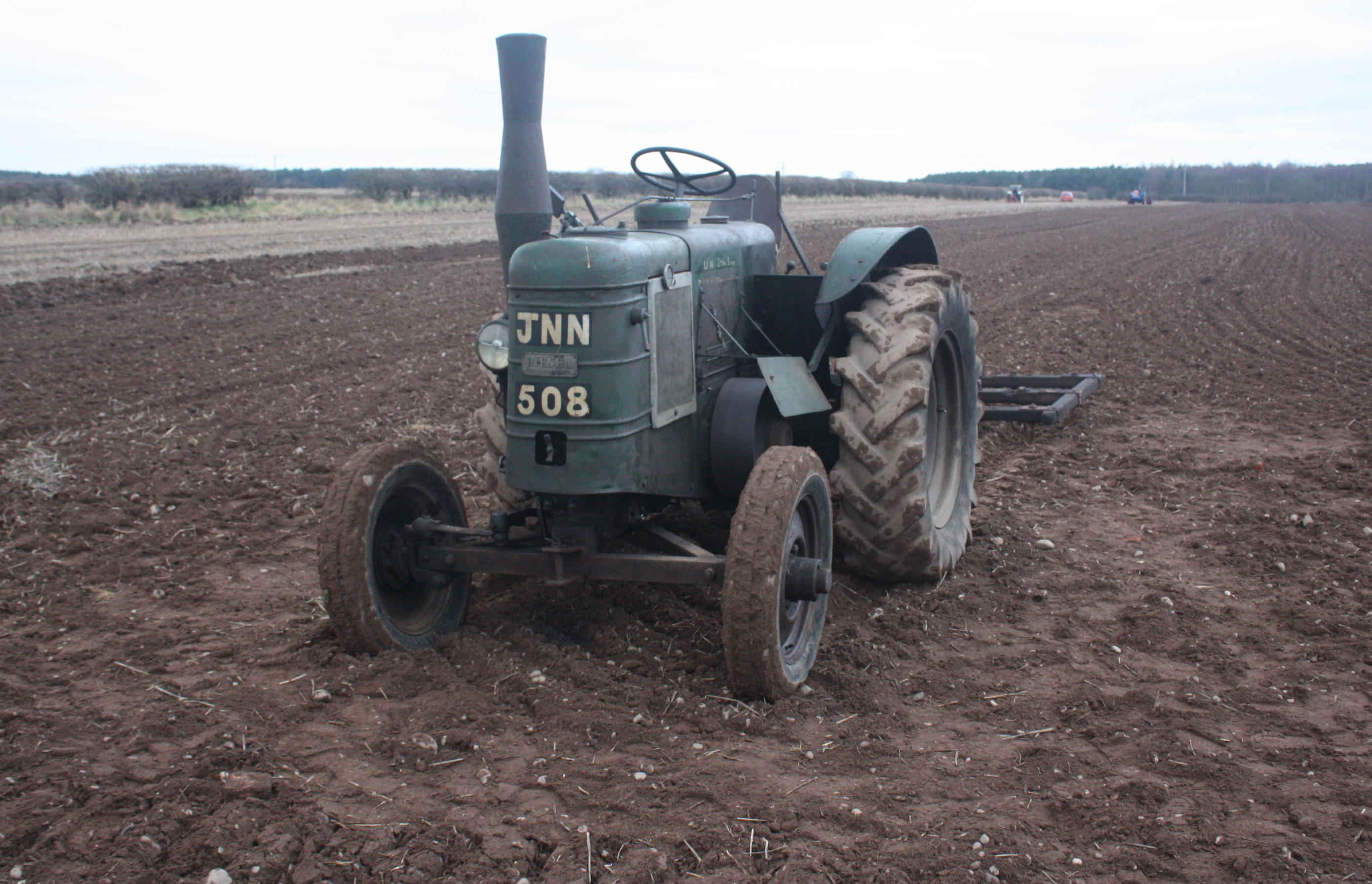
Field Marshall no 4575 pulling a timber drag (spike) harrow

In 1900 they started designing internal combustion-engined tractors to be called the Colonials, with a power of 16 to 32 hp (not comparable to modern hp) for the export market to replace steam engines, selling 300+ by 1914. In 1928 they started to develop a tractor similar to the Lanz Bulldog from Germany. They launched the 15/30 (Model E) in 1930, followed by the 12/20 which became the Model M in 1938; this then developed into the Field-Marshall in 1944. Production of the Field Marshall continued until 1957.

A small number of MP4 and MP 6 tractors were produced after the Field Marshall, but tractor production effectively ceased until 1982, when Charles Nickerson bought the production rights to the Leyland tractors range, producing them at Gainsborough (although using engines and parts from Leyland) and selling them under the Marshall name. Initially successful, the venture failed to generate enough capital to fund the successful development of new models and the company began to lose its market share.

Models included the 502, 602, 604, 702, 704, 802, 804 and 904XL, which were a continuation of the corresponding Leyland models. Other new models were in 1985 the 100 (Leyland 6/98 engine) and a single 115 (Turbo 100 version).

Tractor production moved to Scunthorpe under the ownership of Bentall Simplex. The swap to Perkins 4.236 engines from Leyland 4/98 engines resulted in the 752 and 852 (2WD), 754 and 854 (4WD), and 954XL (95hp 4WD), the six-cylindered 100-4 and 125-4 topped the range. Compact tractors in 1987 were the 184 (187hp 4WD) and 264 (26hp 4WD) and in 1989 were added the 224 (4WD 3-cylinder 22hp) and 304 (4WD 4-cylinder 30hp), all of which were made by Ferrari (tractors) of Luzzara. Around 1990 they began importing Steyr tractors from Austria, and selling them as Marshall D642, D644, D742, D744, D842, D844, D944, D110, D135, and D150. This continued until 1992.

=== Aircraft ===
In 1917 the company started to build aircraft at a new works built for the purpose on Lea Road in Gainsborough. The works became known as the Carr House works and the company built 150 Bristol F2B two-seat biplane fighters. When the aircraft were completed they were dismantled and towed to West Common in Lincoln to be flown, although some were flown from Layne's Field in Gainsborough.

=== Tracked Tractors and Bulldozers ===
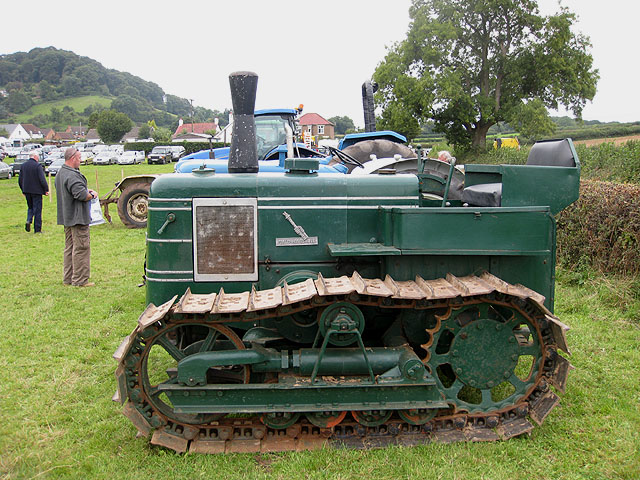
Track Marshall diesel crawler

After the merger with Fowler, their experience with tracked agricultural and military vehicles was used to create the Fowler Marshall Diesel Crawler, which was launched in 1948. Fowler continued to develop and market tracked vehicles while Marshall produced the wheeled Field Marshall tractors as well as other vehicles such as diesel road rollers. The tracked vehicles included the Fowler Challenger and from 1955 the Track Marshall. The Track Marshall was a product that continued under various ownerships, with production of the final model, the TM200, continuing until 1998.

=== Diesel Road Rollers ===
Marshall made diesel road rollers from 1930 until the takeover by British Leyland, latterly under the Road Marshall brand.

== Preserved examples ==
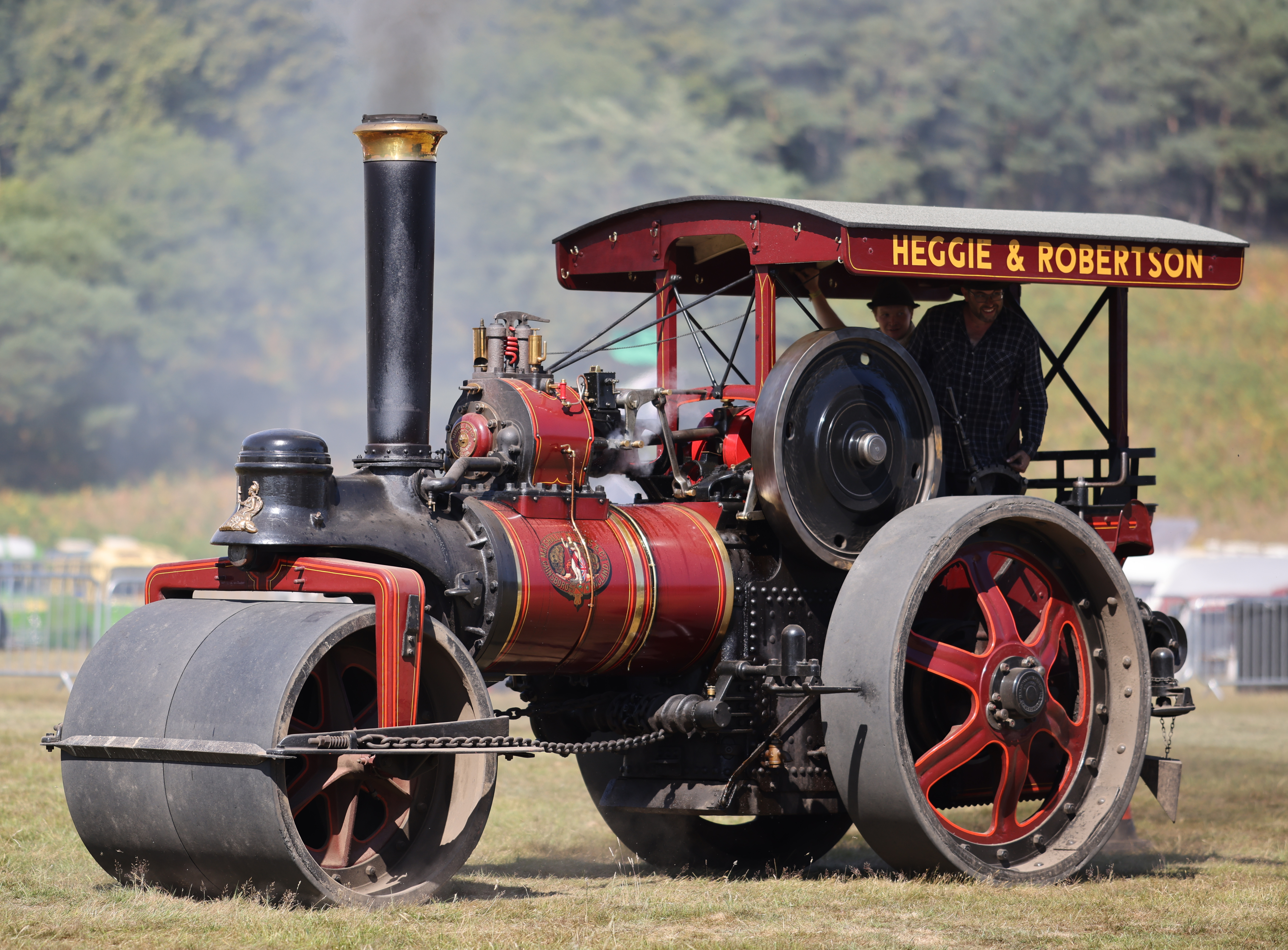
1926 Marshall S type road-roller at The Sussex Steam Rally

Around 350 of the company’s engines survived into preservation with about 120 of those being traction engines.

Marshall, Sons and Co. built the boiler for the Fairbairn steam crane which stands on the dockside in Bristol. The maker's plate reads "Marshall Sons & Co. Ltd., Engineers, Gainsboro, England, No.92766".

What is thought to be one of the oldest surviving Marshall product, works no. 415, a 2.5nhp portable engine from 1866, may be seen at the Turon Technology Museum (Museum of Power), in New South Wales, Australia. This engine is also the oldest documented portable engine in Australia.

Also in Australia, another Marshall steam engine (No 55721, a 20 hp 2 cylinder model) is still working powering the paddle steamer PS Pevensey on tourist trips along the Murray River in Echuca, Victoria (Australia)

The Pallot Steam, Motor & General Museum at Trinity in Jersey has four Marshall models on display, two roadrollers, one large compound 12 Ton model built in 1922 and a smaller compound 8 Ton built in 1925 are fully restored to working order. The remaining two, a 1916 and a 1928 roadroller are awaiting restoration.

The Weald and Downland Museum in Singleton, West Sussex, England has a Marshall Threshing Drum which dates from 1862.

The oldest existing Marshall Traction Engine supplied to the British Market is number 14242, Victoria Empress of India, built in September 1886 and supplied new to Walter Seward of Petersfield, Hampshire, England.

Marshall engine 46583 stands derelict outside at the Gorreana tea plantation on the island of São Miguel in the Azores. Marshall tea processing machinery - some of it still in use - can be found here and also at the nearby Porto Formoso tea plantation.

In Larnaca, Cyprus one portable engine—stamped 1943—stands in public, in a courtyard off King Paul Square (as of 2013).

At Grand Harbour Marina, Birgu, Valletta, Malta, a preserved agricultural engine by Marshalls of unknown date is on display.

In Guernsey, Channel Islands, there is what is believed to be the last surviving Guernsey steam boiler used for sterilising tomato greenhouses. The steam boiler was recently refurbished and is currently in storage with Guernsey museum.

== See also ==
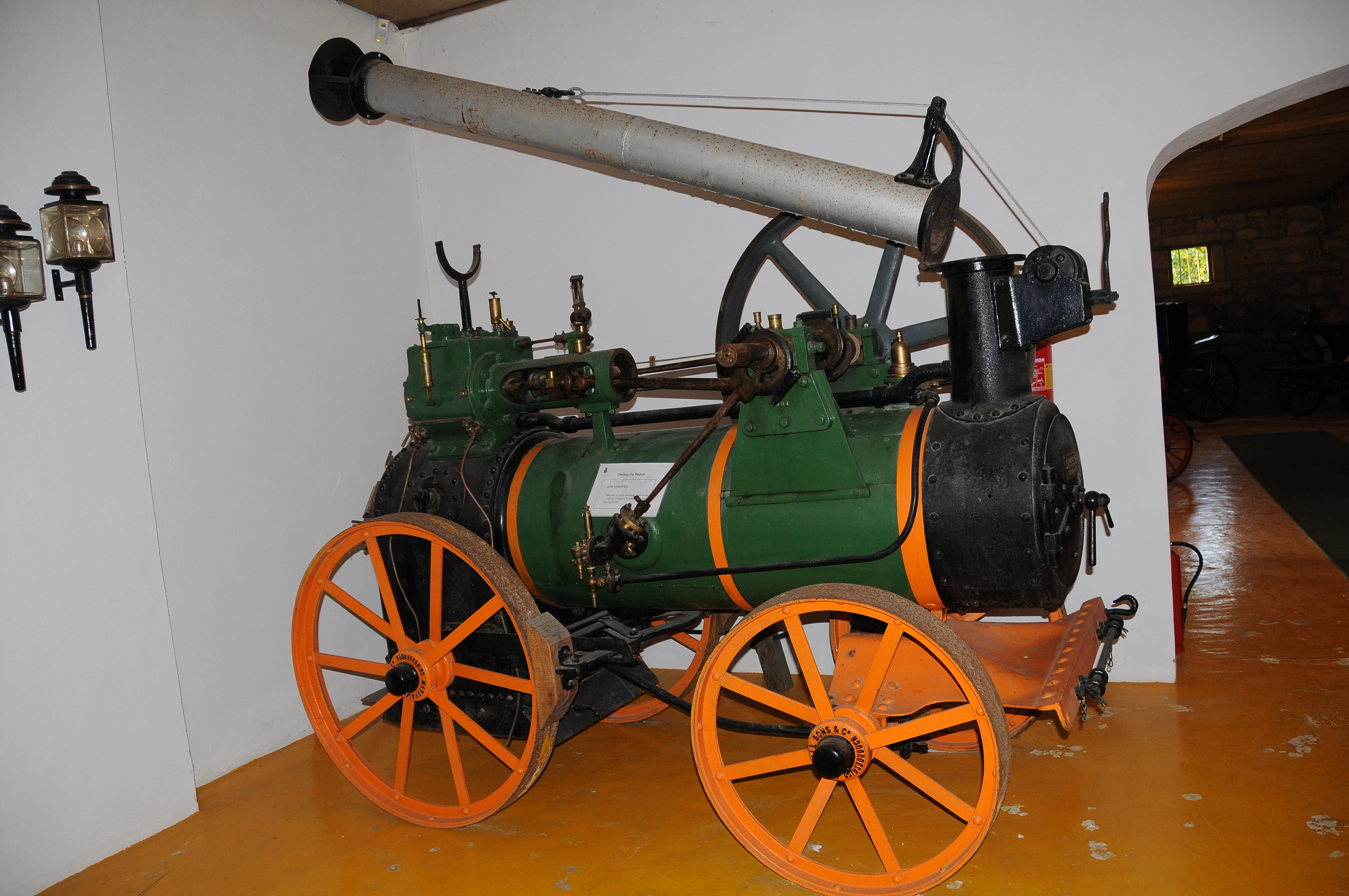
Portable engine in Geraz do Lima museum, Viana do Castelo, Portugal

Competitors in the agricultural machinery market:

- Ruston & Hornsby
- Ruston, Proctor and Company
- Clayton & Shuttleworth
- William Foster & Co.
- John Fowler & Co. – taken over by Marshall
- Aveling-Barford – Steam roller & road roller builders, later part-merged with Marshalls under British Leyland control.
- Leyland tractors – Later became Marshall Tractors in the old Marshall, Sons & Co. factory
