= Leyland Tractors =

British tractor manufacturer

Leyland tractors was a tractor manufacturer in the United Kingdom. It was created after the merger of the British Motor Corporation (BMC) with Leyland Motors to form British Leyland in 1968. Nuffield Tractors had been started after World War II by Lord Nuffield owner of Morris Motors Limited which had become part of BMC in 1951.

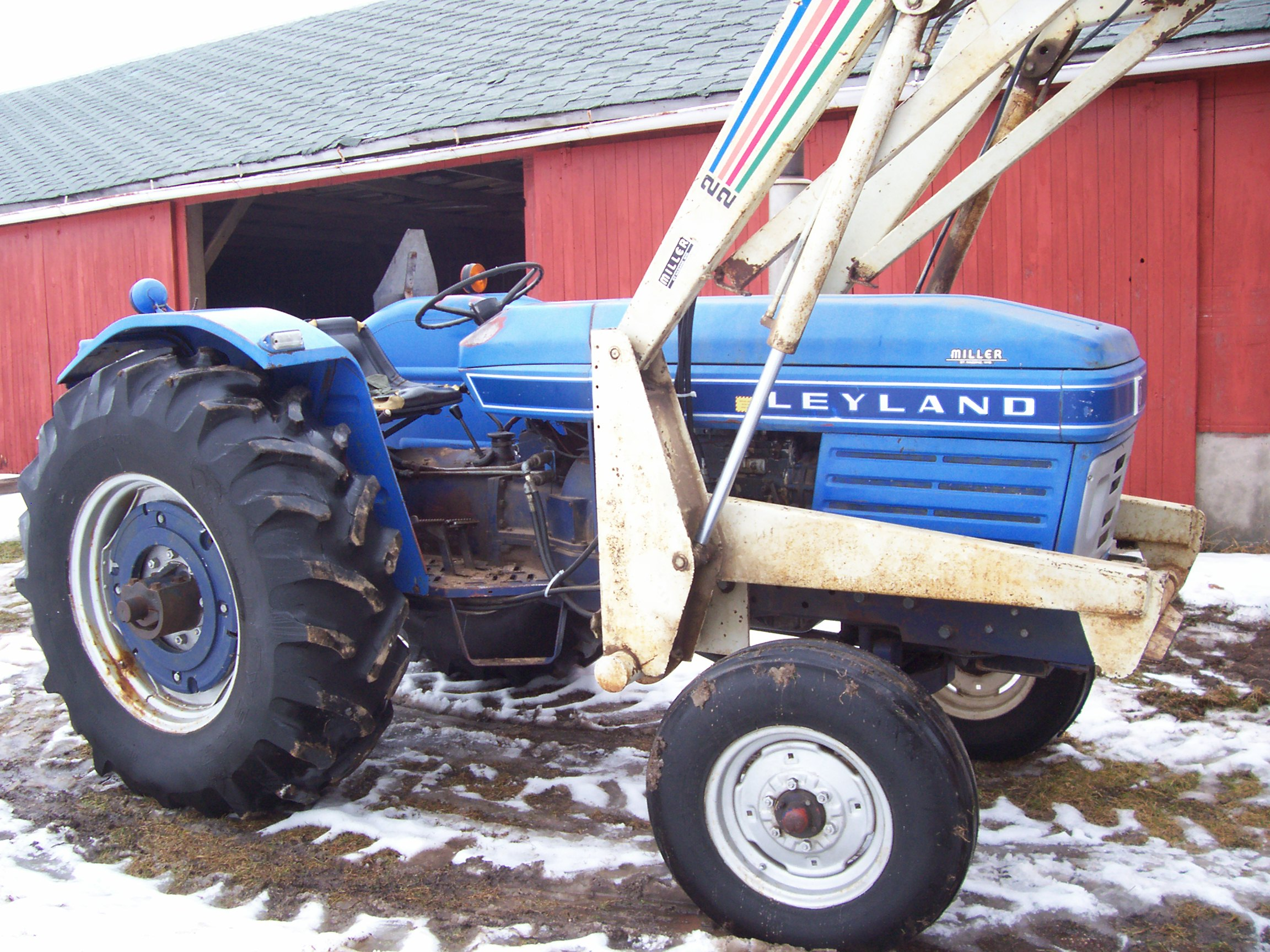
Leyland 270 tractor

After the merger Leyland changed the colour from the Poppy Red of Nuffield to two tone blue which would eventually last right up to the early 1980s. Production moved to Bathgate in Scotland. When Leyland took over Nuffield the Nuffield name still appeared until 1969 before it was completely abolished.

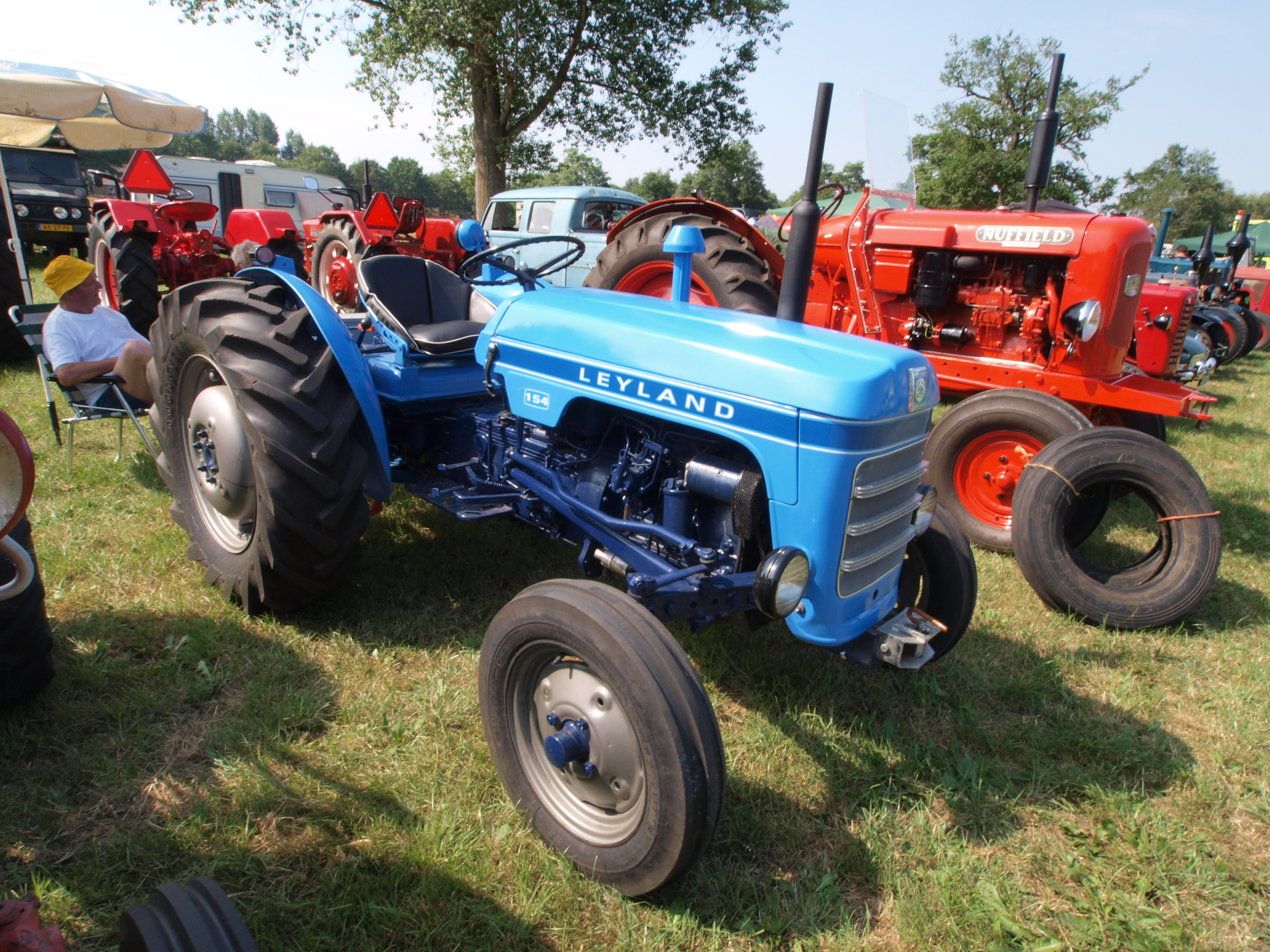
Leyland 154

Initially, the skid units were carried over from the Nuffield product, including the 3.4L engine, 3.8L engine and the 10 speed Gearbox (5x1 with High/Low Range). The bodywork and colour scheme was changed, and Leyland introduced its own Cab to comply with safety regulations. The engines were replaced by the 98 series engines, 4/98 and 6/98, representing the number of cylinders, and the bore diameter of the engine. The 10 speed gearbox was replaced by a 9 speed 3x3 Synchro Gearbox, with flat cab floor.

Models included the: 154, 184, 245, 253, 255, 262, 270, 272, 282, 285, 2100, 344, 384, 462, 472, 482 and 485. Then the "harvest gold" coloured: 302, 602, 604, 702, 704, 802, 804 and the 904XL. BL then sold Leyland tractors in 1982 to Marshall Tractors Ltd and production moved to Gainsborough in Lincolnshire.

== See also ==
- List of tractor manufacturers
- List of former tractor manufacturers
- Marshall, Sons & Co.
