= Track Marshall =

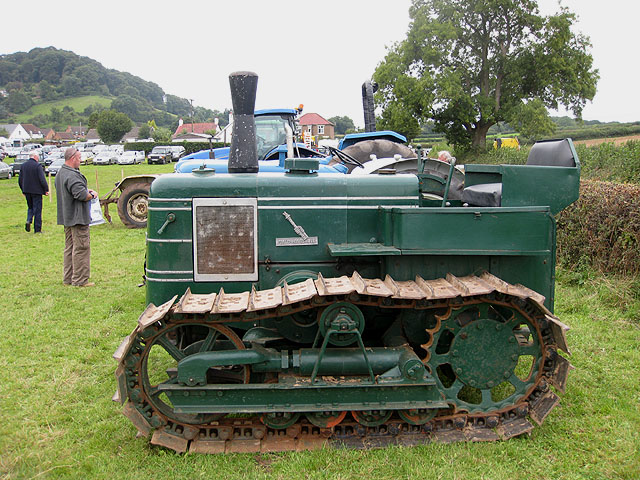

Track Marshall was a crawler tractor, that had its origins in the merger of the Fowler and Marshall companies shortly after WW2.

== Origins ==
The Track Marshall came about due to the takeover of John Fowler and Company (Leeds) Ltd by Marshall, Sons & Co. in 1947 - Marshall was itself owned by Thomas W. Ward Ltd (since 1935). Marshall had been making single-cylinder diesel wheeled tractors since 1930. Fowler on the other hand had been engaged in making tracked vehicles, especially during WW2. When the two companies' activities were merged it was decided that the Fowler company would manufacture a tracked version of the Field Marshall wheeled tractor. The new Fowler product was announced in early 1948 as the 'Fowler Marshall Diesel Crawler Tractor Mark V.F.'. Fowler and Marshall further developed the tracked crawler and in 1951 introduced the Fowler Challenger Mk 1 with a Marshall ED5 twin cylinder 2-stroke diesel engine. Then in 1956 they started selling their new model, the Track-Marshall, which was a crawler fitted with a Perkins L4 four cylinder diesel of 48hp. Also new was the Fowler Challenger Mk 2 with a Leyland six-cylinder 60hp diesel engine.

== Models ==
Demonstrated in 1955, and for sale in 1956 the first Track Marshall tracked tractor model was fitted with a Perkins L4 four cylinder diesel of 48hp. Fowler also produced the Challenger range of tracked tractors at the same time.

Track Marshall models were produced with increasing power over the years, and then when the business was sold to British Leyland in 1972, the models were continued branded as Aveling-Marshall.
