= Nuffield Universal =

British farm tractor produced 1948–1969

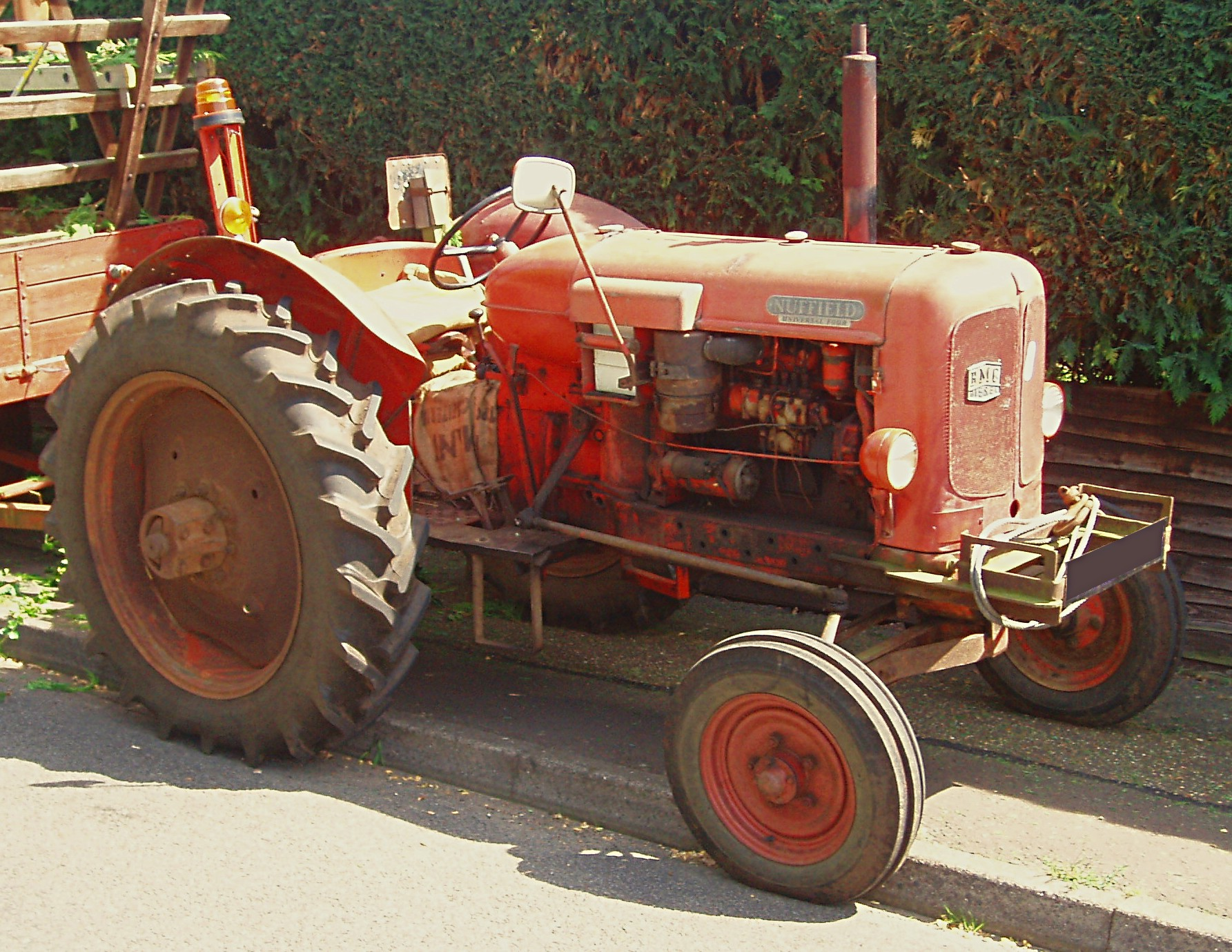
Nuffield Universal Four

The Nuffield Universal was a tractor produced from 1948 by the Agricultural Division of Morris Motors, later a subsidiary of The British Motor Corporation Limited. When William Morris the founder of Morris Motors was honoured with a title and elevated to the peerage he chose the name of his Nuffield, Oxfordshire village. When in 1948 the Morris Motors Agricultural Division launched its tractor range, the name Nuffield was chosen to be the brand name for the company's agricultural products. The design was similar to the new David Brown built tractors as the designer Dr. Merit had also worked on the design of the David Brown 50D before moving to Nuffield. Nuffield were part of the amalgamations that created British Leyland in 1968, becoming part of Leyland Tractors.

== History ==
=== Origins ===
In 1945 as part of post World War 2 recovery plans, the British Government approached the Nuffield Organisation suggesting that they design and manufacture a new all-British tractor. Having given this due consideration, Morris Motors Limited vice chairman Sir Miles Thomas announced to the I.S.M.A at Hull in 1946 "Nuffield to Make Tractors".

Designed by former David Brown tractor designer Dr. H E Merritt, who had been involved in tank design during the war, tractor manufacture was to be undertaken at the former Wolseley factory in Birmingham as car production had recently been moved to Cowley, and by May 1946 a prototype tractor had been produced. A further 12 prototypes were produced before the end of that year culminating in a demonstration in Pershore in December. Due to steel shortages, production started in 1948 with the Nuffield Universal tractor being launched at the Smithfield Show in December of that year. The tractors were produced in a bright red-orange officially referred to as "Poppy Orange" and similar in hue to the colour of American Allis-Chalmers tractors.

=== Early years ===
The M3 and M4 both had a 5-speed gearbox and came with a range of additional extras available including £9 for horn and lights. Initial production was for domestic use, but by 1950 export opportunities were being pursued. In the US Nuffield tractors were imported by Long Manufacturing and were rebadged by them. The Nuffield also proved popular in the Netherlands initially being imported by Bautz; the Nuffield 4 was marketed as the Nuffield "Vier". In Spain the branding was Sava Nuffield.

== Engines ==
=== Petrol-paraffin ===
Petrol-paraffin engine models introduced at the 1948 Smithfield Show were the Nuffield Universal M4 and the tricycle-wheeled M3. Both tractors were powered by an engine based on the side-valve Morris Commercial four-cylinder lorry engine, running on tractor vaporising oil and delivering 42 hp.

=== Diesel ===
The first diesel powered Nuffield was the Universal DM4 which was powered by a 38 hp Perkins P4 (TA) engine. After Morris Motors became part of the British Motor Corporation (BMC) in 1951, the Perkins engine was retained until 1954 when it was replaced by a 45 h.p. BMC diesel engine, tractors with this engine being recognisable as they bear a badge "BMC Diesel".

== Variants ==
=== M4 and M3 ===
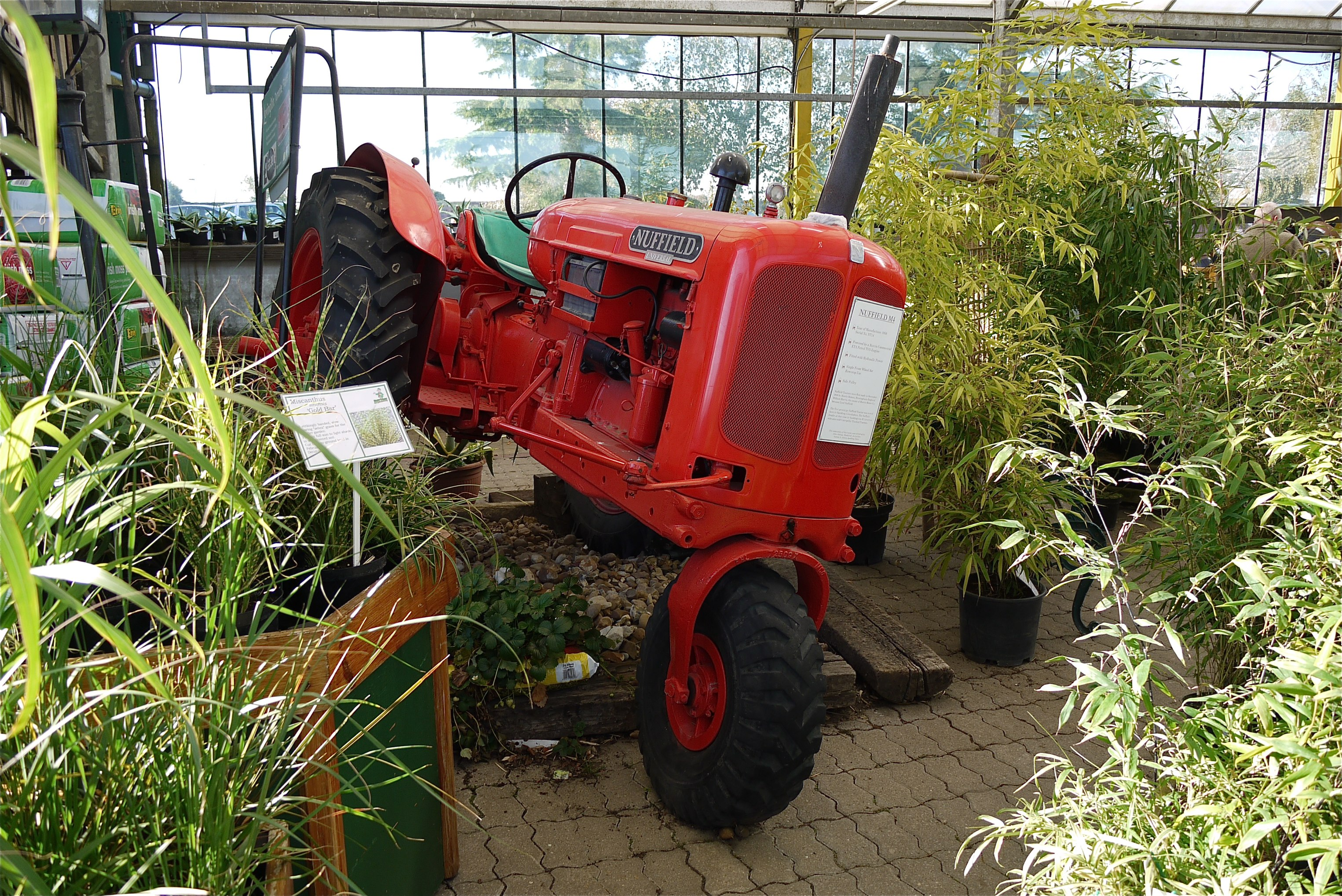
3-Wheel M tractor

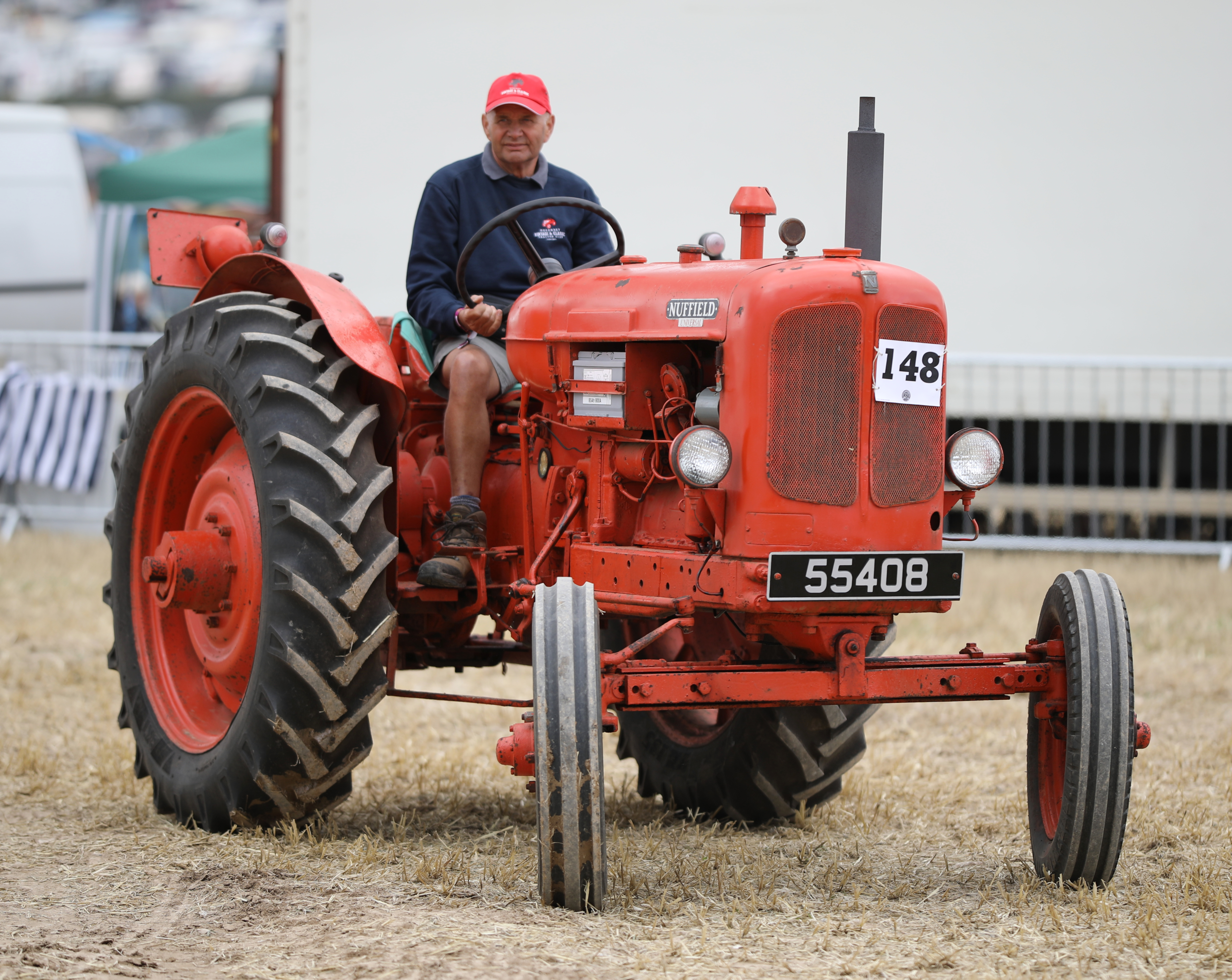
4-wheel M tractor

Both variants were in production between 1948 and 1961. The original engine for both M4 and M3 was a Morris Commercial 4-cylinder sidevalve engine running on tractor vaporising oil, delivering 42 hp.

- M4 Conventional 4-wheel model
- M3 Single front wheel version for row crop work.

A total of 5008 M3/M4 tractors were produced.

=== DM4 & PM4 ===
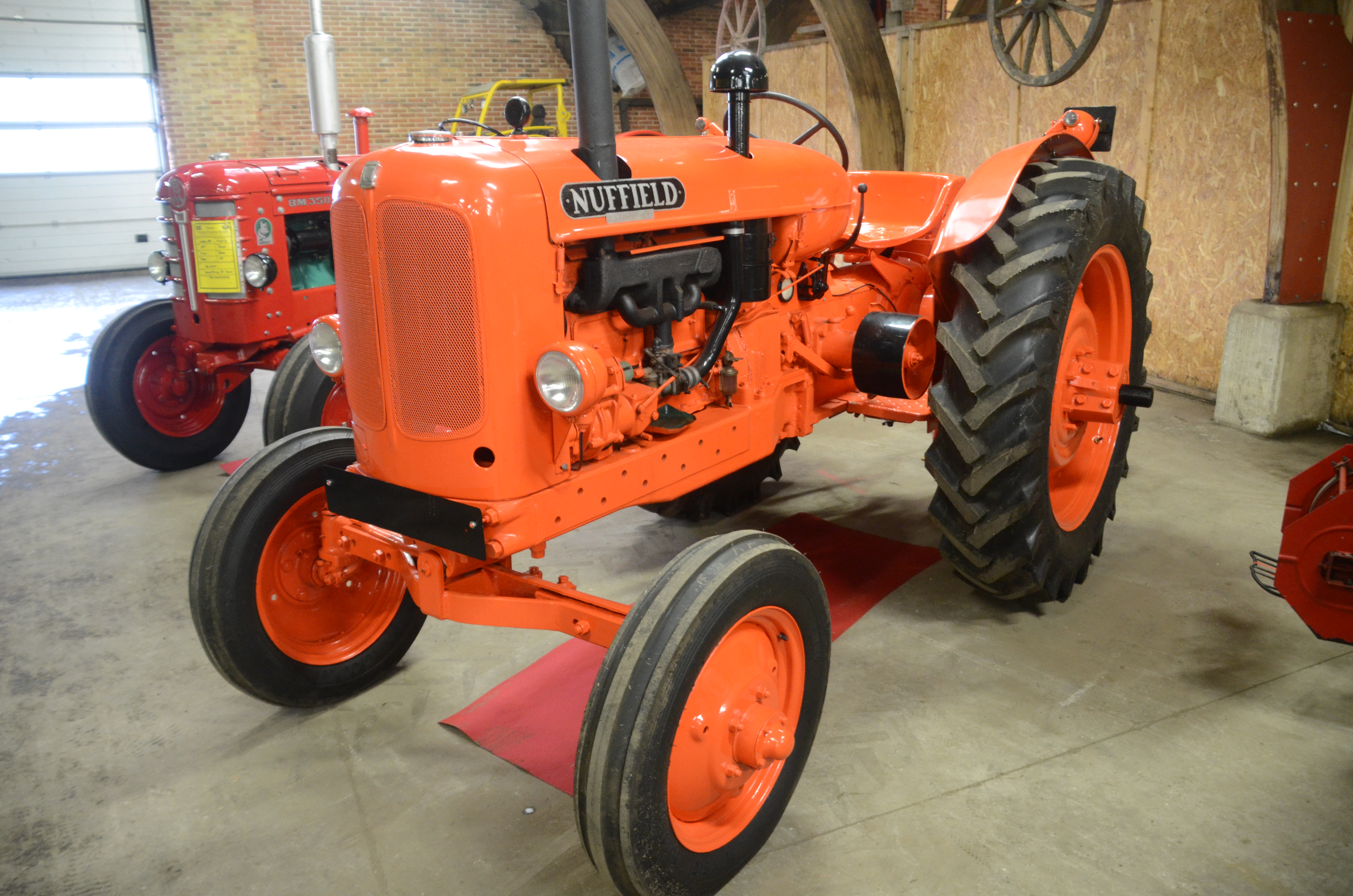
1950 Nuffield PM4 seen at Gram Castle, Denmark 2023

Produced between 1950 and 1961

- DM4 - A diesel engine variant with a Perkins T4 engine producing 48 horsepower (36 kW), replaced by a British Motor Corporation diesel of 45 horsepower (34 kW) from 1954
- PM4 - A petrol variant with a 48 horsepower (36 kW) engine

A total of 7545 DM4 and 3653 PM4 tractors were produced.

=== Universal 3(3DL) and 4(4DM) ===
Built from 1952 to 1961:

- 3DL 2.55L 3 Cylinder Engine 37 horsepower (28 kW)
- 4DM 3.4L 4 Cylinder Engine 53 horsepower (40 kW)

=== 3/42 and 4/60 ===
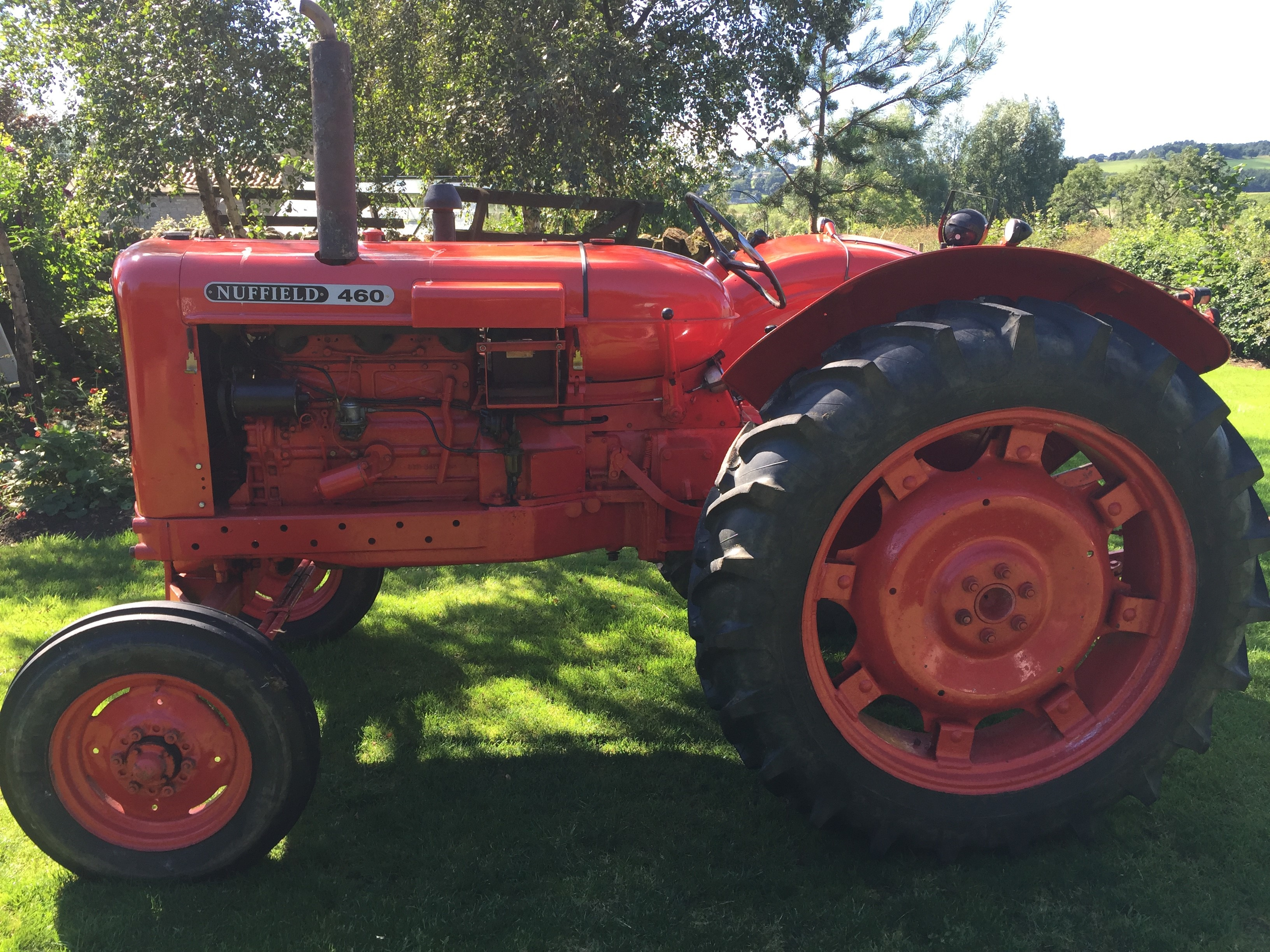
1962 Nuffield 460

Built from 1961 to 1963 or 1964. All tractors built at Bathgate in Scotland from 1962.

- 3/42 2.8L 3-cylinder diesel producing 39.2 horsepower (29.2 kW)
- Export 3/42 models had a 2.55L engine with vacuum governor like the 3DL.
- 4/60 3.8L BMC 'OE4' 4-cylinder diesel engine. Produced by increasing the bore of the 3.4L engine from the 4DM.

=== 10 series ===
Built from 1964 to 1966 or 1967. The 10 series was claimed to be the first British tractor with 10 forward gears.

- 10/42 - 2.8L diesel engine, 42 horsepower (31 kW)
- 10/60 - 3.8L BMC diesel engine, 60 horsepower (45 kW)
- 10/90 - BMC diesel engine

=== Mini 9/16 ===
Built from 1965 to 1968. This model had a 16 horsepower (12 kW) engine.

=== 3/45 and 4/65 ===
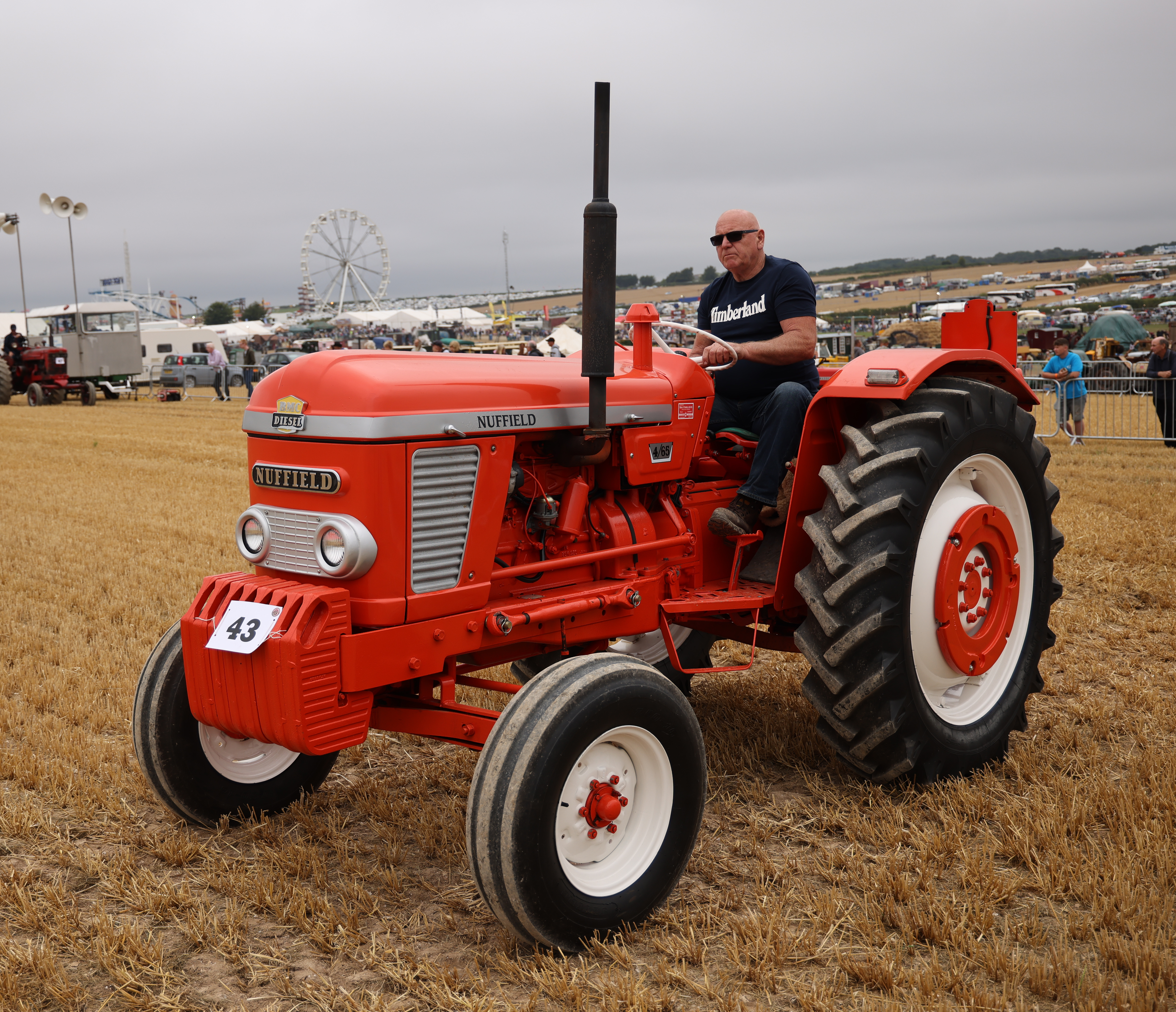
1968 Nuffield 4/65

Built from 1967 to 1969.

- 3/45 - an uprated version of the 2.8L diesel engine used in the 10/40 and now rated at 45 horsepower (34 kW)
- 4/65 - an uprated version of the 3.8L BMC 4-cylinder diesel engine used in the 10/60, it had 8 overhead valves and was now rated at 65 horsepower (48 kW)

== Demise ==
In 1968, BMC's holding company British Motor Holdings was amalgamated with the Leyland Motor Corporation which also owned Standard Triumph and Rover to become British Leyland. Tractor production continued under the Nuffield name until 1969 when the tractors were renamed as Leyland Tractors and the previous poppy-red tractors changed to the new two-tone blue Leyland corporate colour scheme.

However the final end of Nuffield may have been different as it is reported that British Leyland considered divesting itself of the tractor business and a sale to David Brown. Some preparatory effort was made but there does not seem to have been sufficient commercial benefit for the merger to happen without some accompanying political imperative and nothing came of the move.

== Restoration ==
Most versions of Nuffield tractors are still in existence, perhaps both an illustration of the strength of the design and the fondness that people feel for the marque. Parts, including some newly manufactured replacements, are still available from specialist stockists. A special paint colour named "Nuffield Tractor Orange" is currently available (2021).

== Models ==
1:32 scale models have been produced of both the Universal 4 and the 10/60 variants. There have also been limited edition hand-built models of the 4/60 and 10/60 available.

== See also ==
- List of tractor manufacturers
- List of former tractor manufacturers
