= Acason Motor Truck Co. =

Defunct American motor vehicle manufacturer

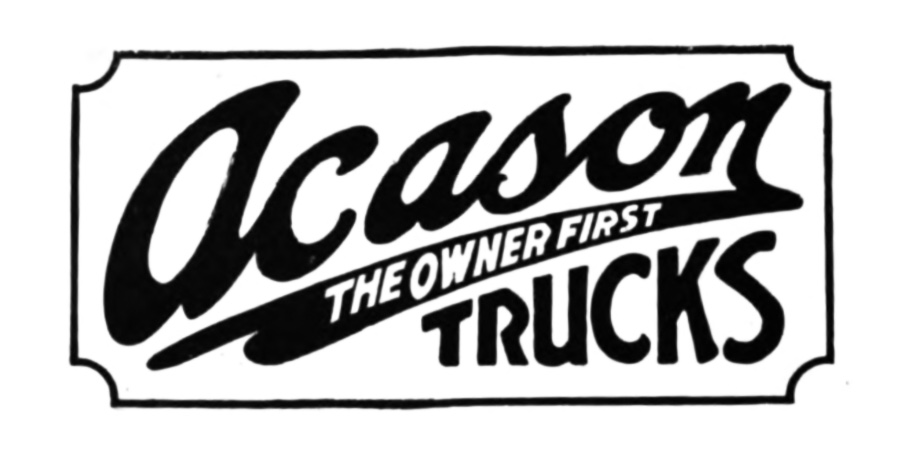
- Type: Truck Company
- Industry: Manufacturing
- Founded: 1915; 111 years ago
- Founder: H.W. Acason
- Defunct: 1925; 101 years ago
- Headquarters: Detroit, Michigan, US
- Products: Trucks

The Acason Motor Truck Co. of Detroit, was a truck manufacturer.

== History ==
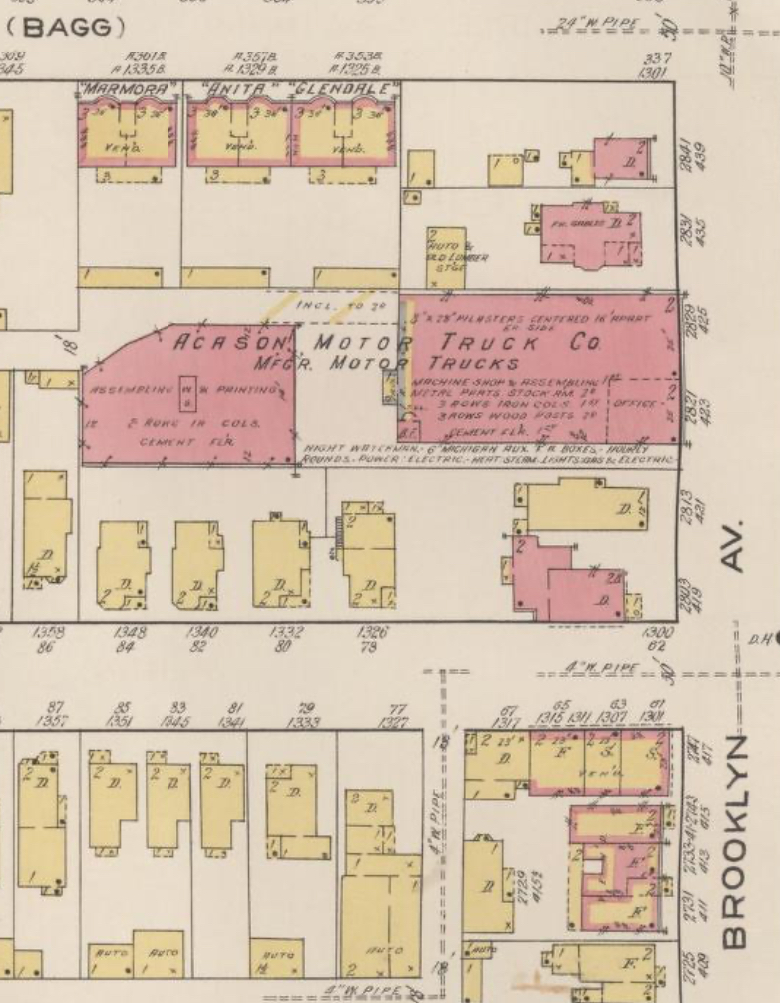
Acason plant (1921)

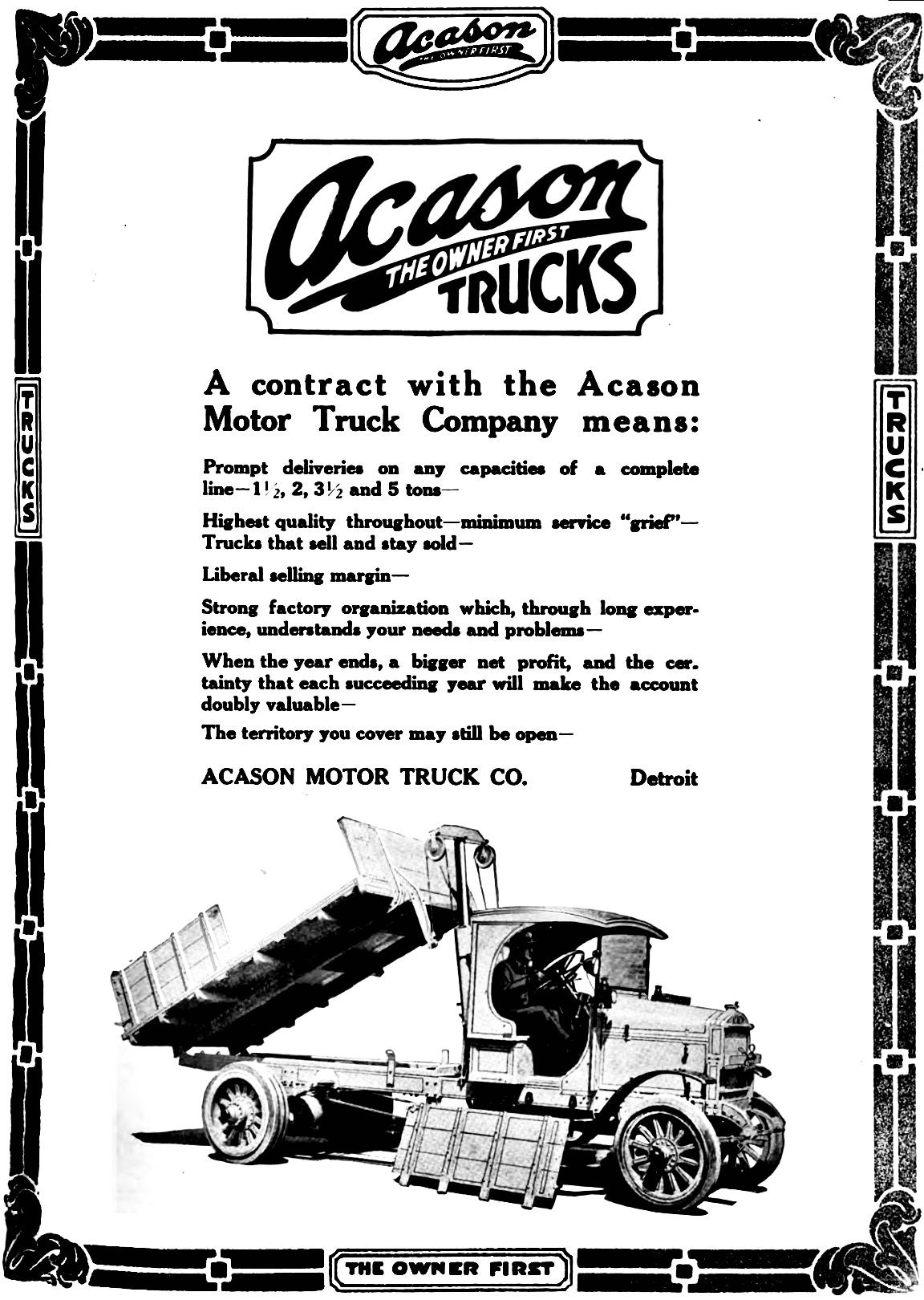
Acason advertisement (1918)

Acason Model M advertisement (1918)

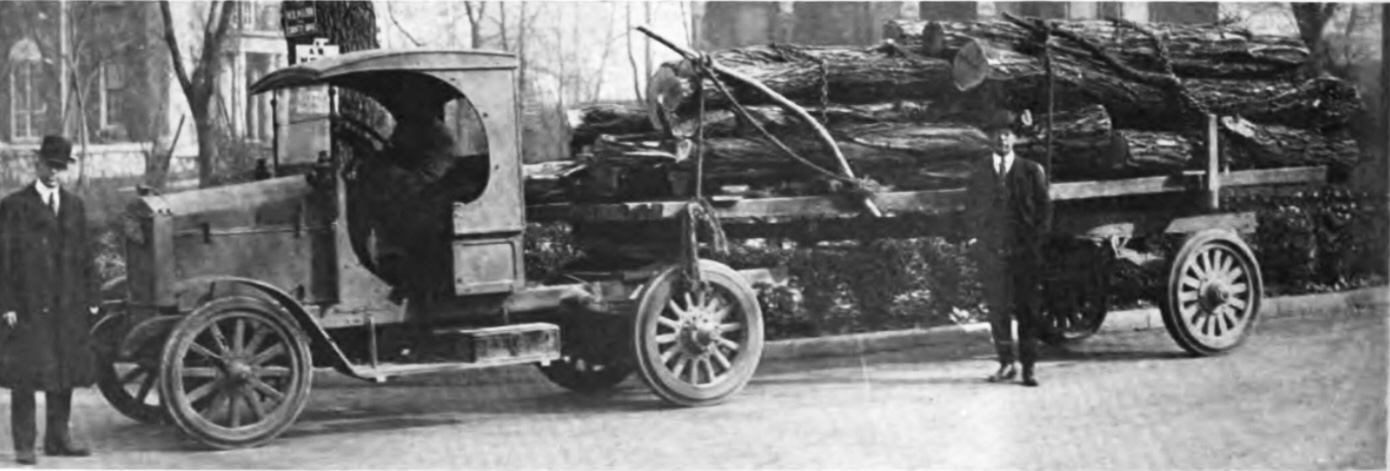
Acason Model H (1918) 2 t

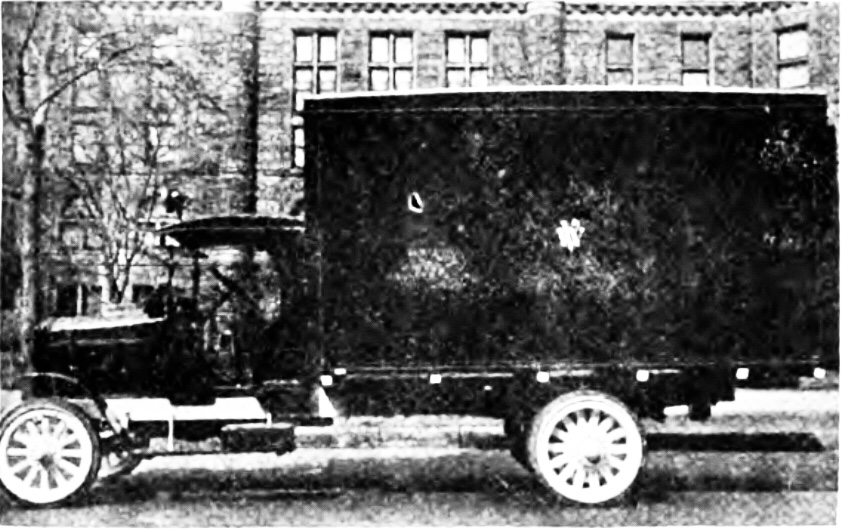
Acason Model L (1918) 3,5 t

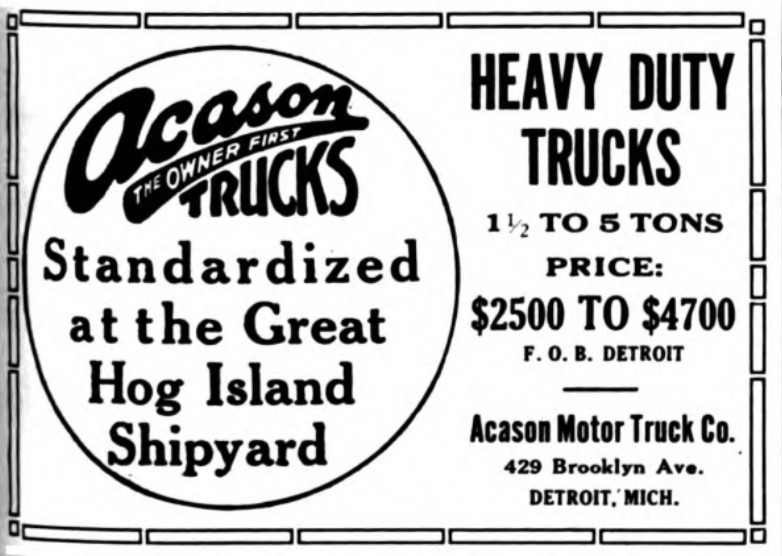
Acason Trucks

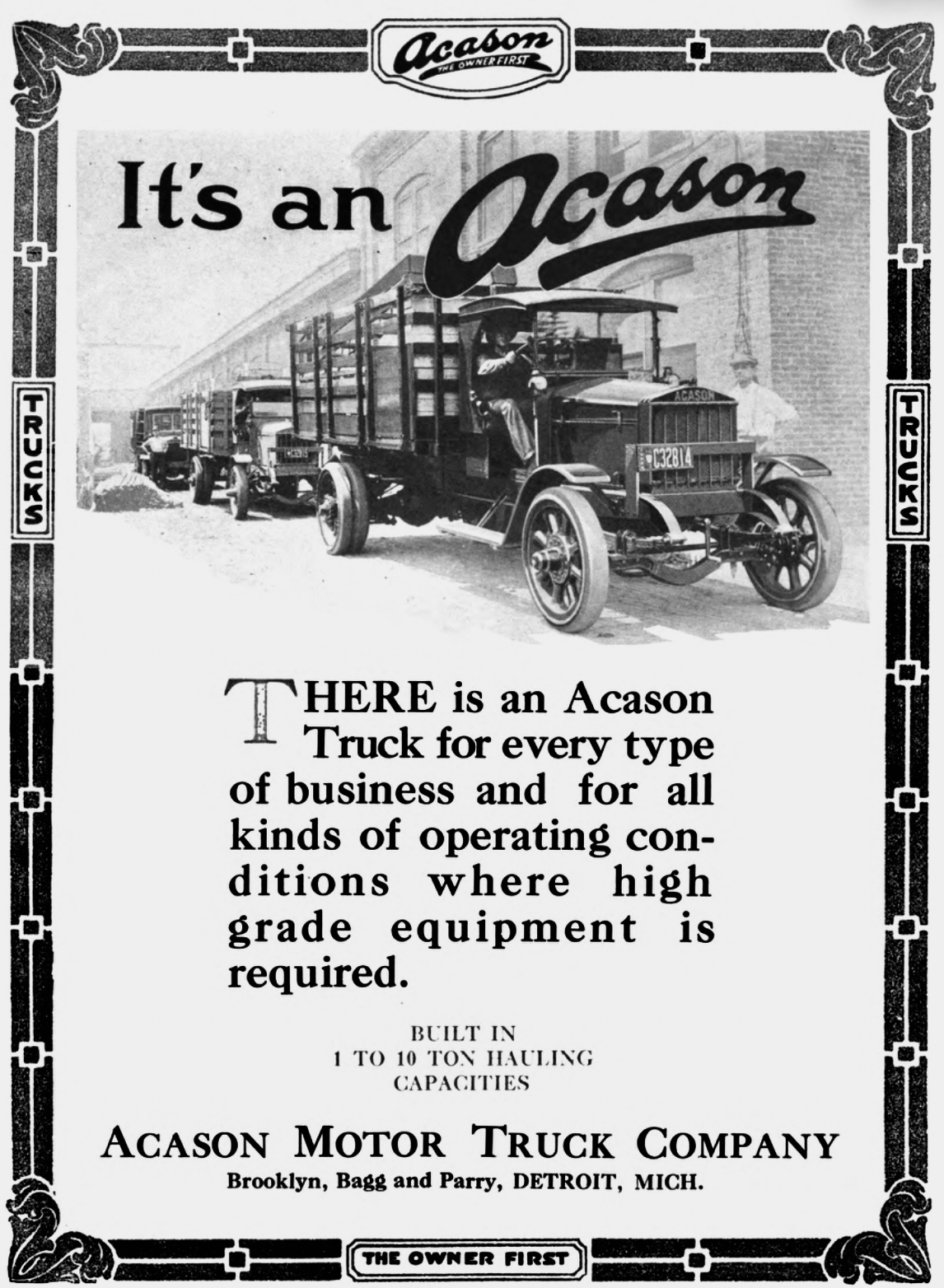
Acason Motor Truck

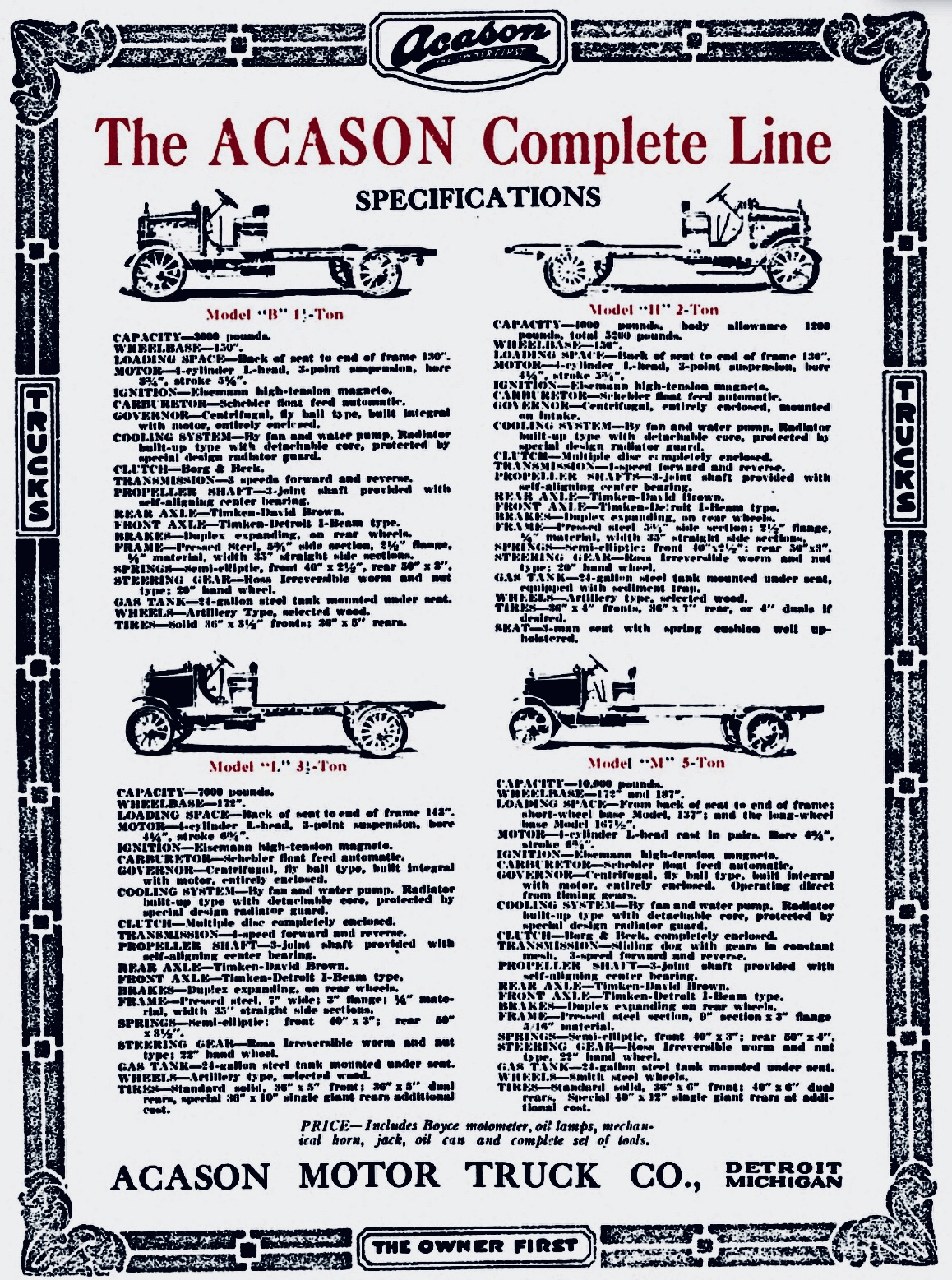
Acason Specifications Model B,H,L,M

The Acason Motor Truck Co. started in Detroit in 1915. H. W. Acason, president of the Acason Motor Truck Co., announced in 1918 the election of H. A. Conlon as vice president of the company, succeeding J. F. Bowman. Conlon and Bowman had been working together for years, first at the Federal Motor Truck Company and later at Acason. The sixteenth annual Boston Automobile Exhibition, March 2 to 9, 1918, showcased the complete vehicle lineup from Acason consisting of:

- Acason Model B 1.5 tons with a four-cylinder engine for a price of 2400 dollars.
- Acason Model H 2 tons with a four-cylinder engine for a price of 2750 dollars.
- Acason Model L 3.5 tons with a four-cylinder engine for a price of 3600 dollars.
- Acason Model M 5 tons with a four-cylinder engine for a price of 4600 dollars.
- Light Tractor with a four-cylinder engine for a price of 2850 dollars.
- Heavy Tractor with a four-cylinder engine for a price of 4200 dollars.

The engines were supplied by the company Waukesha. The robustness of the vehicles was demonstrated during a long-term test, when a five-ton vehicle was operated around the clock for 21 days.

In the year 1921, the model program consisted of the following vehicles:

- 0,75 t with a four-cylinder engine 3620 cc (bore 95,25 mm; Stroke 127 mm); Price 1650 dollars
- Acason Model R 1t with a four-cylinder engine 3801 cc (bore 95,25 mm; Stroke 133,35 mm); Price 2260 dollars
- Acason Model RB 1,5t with a four-cylinder engine 3801 cc (bore 95,25 mm; Stroke 133,35 mm); Price 2485 dollars
- Acason Model H 2,5t with a four-cylinder engine 5173 cc (bore 111,125 mm; Stroke 133,35 mm); Price 3295 dollars
- Acason Model L 3,5t with a four-cylinder engine 5173 cc (bore 111,125 mm; Stroke 133,35 mm); Price 4295 dollars
- Acason Model M 5t with a four-cylinder engine 8045 cc (bore 127 mm; Stroke 158,75 mm); Price 5250 dollars

=== Production figures Acason trucks ===
The pre-assigned serial numbers only indicate the maximum possible production quantity.

| Year | Production figures | Model | Load capacity | Serial number |
|---|---|---|---|---|
| 1916 | ~ 100 | B | 1,5 to | 100 to 200 |
| 1916 | ~ 72 | H | 2 to | 200 to 271 |
| 1916 | 107 | L | 3,5 to | 300 to 406 |
| 1916 | ~ 400 | M | 5 to | 500 to 900 |
| 1917 | 7 | B | 1,5 to | 1000 to 1006 |
| 1917 | ↑ | H | 2 to | ↑ |
| 1917 | ~ 125 | L | 3,5 to | 3100 to 3225 |
| 1917 | ~ 10 | M | 5 to | 5000 to 5010 |
| 1918 | ~ 135 | R | 1 to | 1062 to 1196 |
| 1918 | ↑ | RB | 1,5 to | ↑ |
| 1918 | ~ 83 | H | 2 to | 2000 to 2082 |
| 1918 | ~ 84 | L | 3,5 to | 3000 to 3033 and 3226 to 3275 |
| 1918 | ~ 60 | M | 5 to | 533 to 569 and 5000 to 5022 |
| 1918 | | light tractor | 6 to | |
| 1918 | | heavy tractor | 10 to | |
| 1919 | ↑ | R | 1 to | ↑ |
| 1919 | ↑ | RB | 1,5 to | ↑ |
| 1919 | ~ 162 | H | 2 to | 2082 to 2243 |
| 1919 | ~ 89 | L | 3,5 to | 3034 to 3122 |
| 1919 | ~ 66 | M | 5 to | 5023 to 5088 |
| 1920 | 102 (incl. some RB) | R | 1 to | 1197 to 1275 and 91000 to 91022 |
| 1920 | 28 | RB | 1,5 to | 91500 to 91527 |
| 1920 | 143 | H | 2,5 to | 2244 to 2350 and 92000 to 92035 |
| 1920 | 99 | L | 3,5 to | 3123 to 3175 and 93000 to 93045 |
| 1920 | 83 | M | 5 to | 5089 to 5150 and 95000 to 95020 |
| 1921 | | fast | 0,75 to | 75000 to |
| 1921 | | R | 1 to | 91022 to |
| 1921 | | RB | 1,5 to | 91527 to |
| 1921 | | H | 2,5 to | 92035 to |
| 1921 | | L | 3,5 to | 93045 to |
| 1921 | | M | 5 to | 95020 to |
| 1922 | | fast | 0,75 to | |
| 1922 | | R | 1 to | |
| 1922 | | RB | 1,5 to | |
| 1922 | | H | 2,5 to | |
| 1922 | | L | 3,5 to | |
| 1922 | | M | 5 to | |
| 1923 | | K2 | 2 to | |
| 1923 | | K3 | 3 to | |
| 1923 | | K4 | 4 to | |
| 1924 | | K2 | 2 to | |
| 1924 | | K3 | 3 to | |
| 1924 | | K4 | 4 to | |
| 1925 | | K2 | 2 to | |
| 1925 | | K3 | 3 to | |
| 1925 | | K4 | 4 to | |
| Sum | | | | |
