= Federal Motor Truck Company =

American truck manufacturer

- Formerly: Bailey Motor Truck Company
- Industry: Manufacturing, automotive
- Predecessor: Stewart Motor Company (since 1942)
- Founded: May 1910; 116 years ago
- Defunct: March 1960; 66 years ago
- Fate: Sold to NAPCO
- Successor: NAPCO
- Products: Trucks

The Federal Motor Truck Company was an American truck manufacturer headquartered in Detroit, Michigan. The company was founded in 1910 as Bailey Motor Truck Company by Martin L. Pulcher, who would later found the Oakland Motor Car Company, which launched the Pontiac GM companion brand in 1926.

== History ==
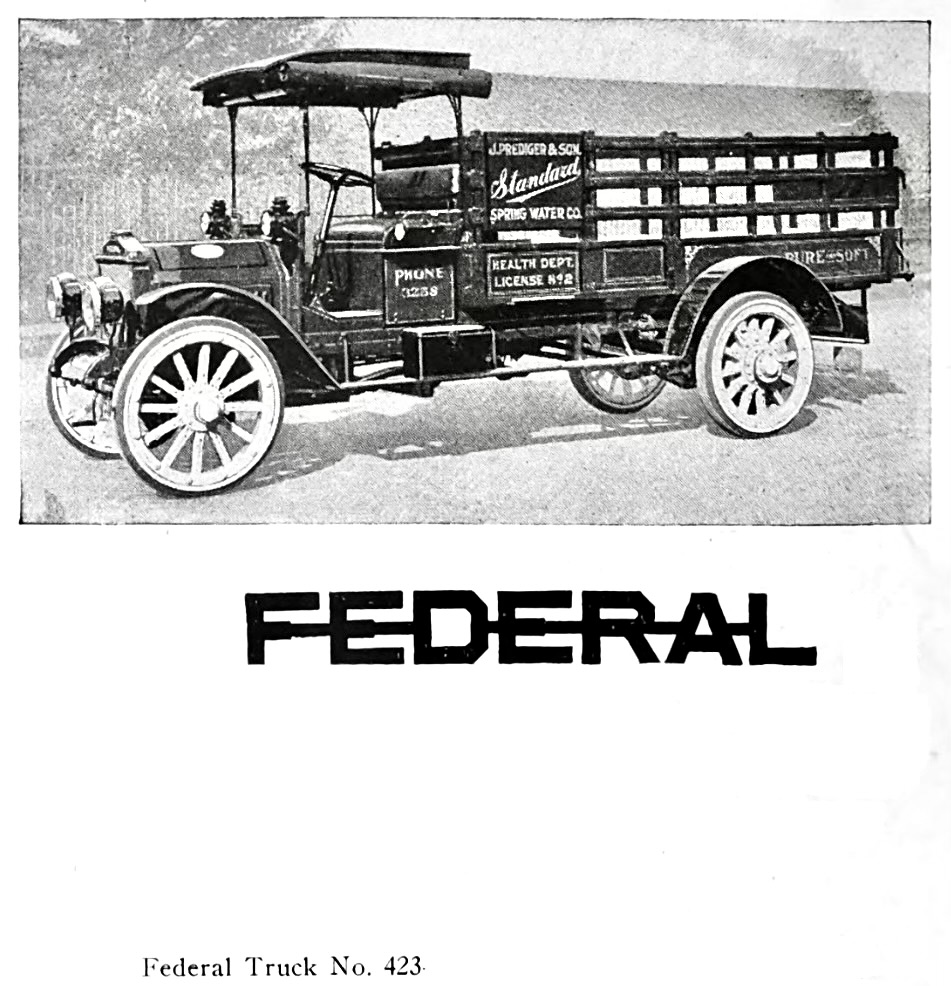
Federal truck No. 423

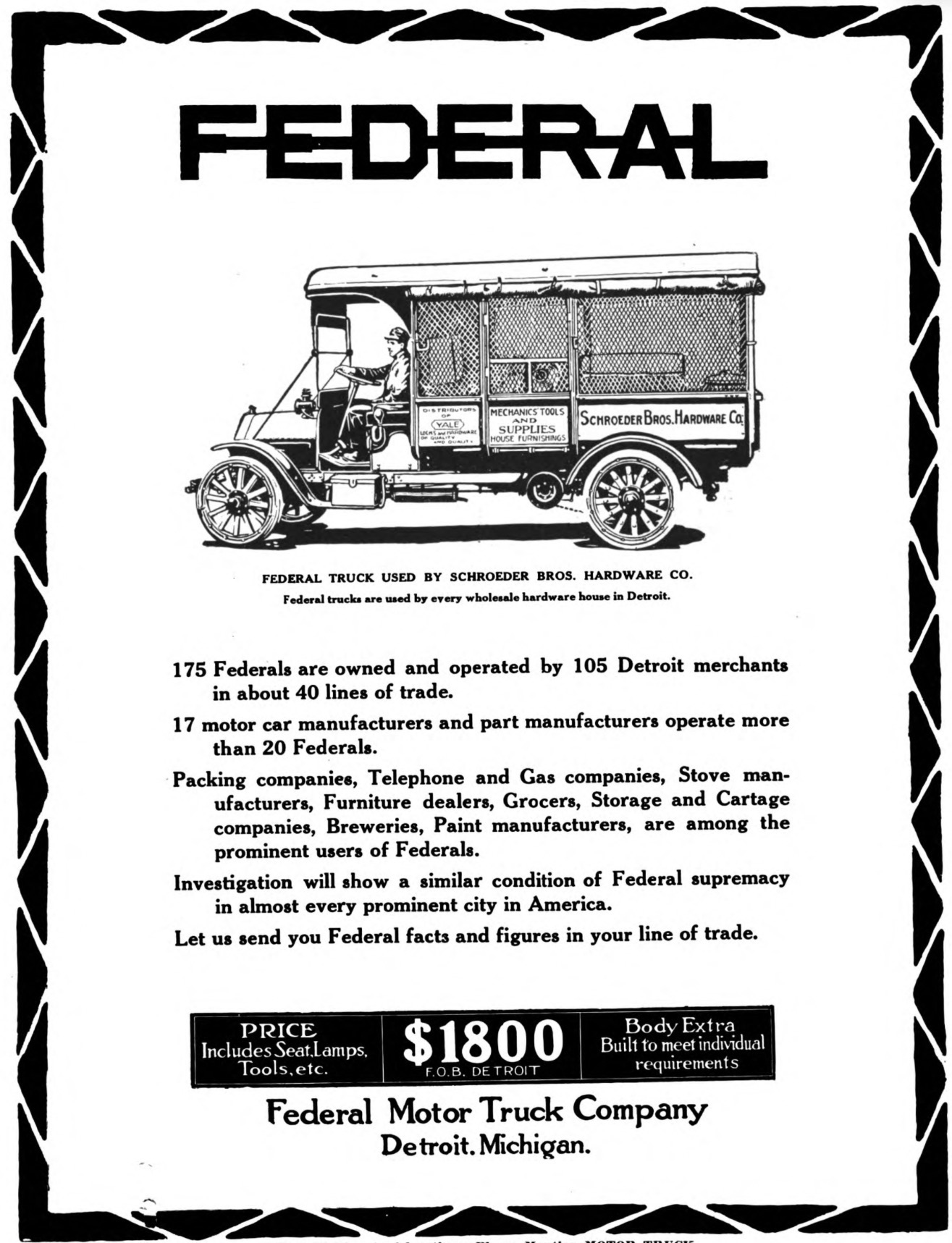
Federal advertisement (1913)

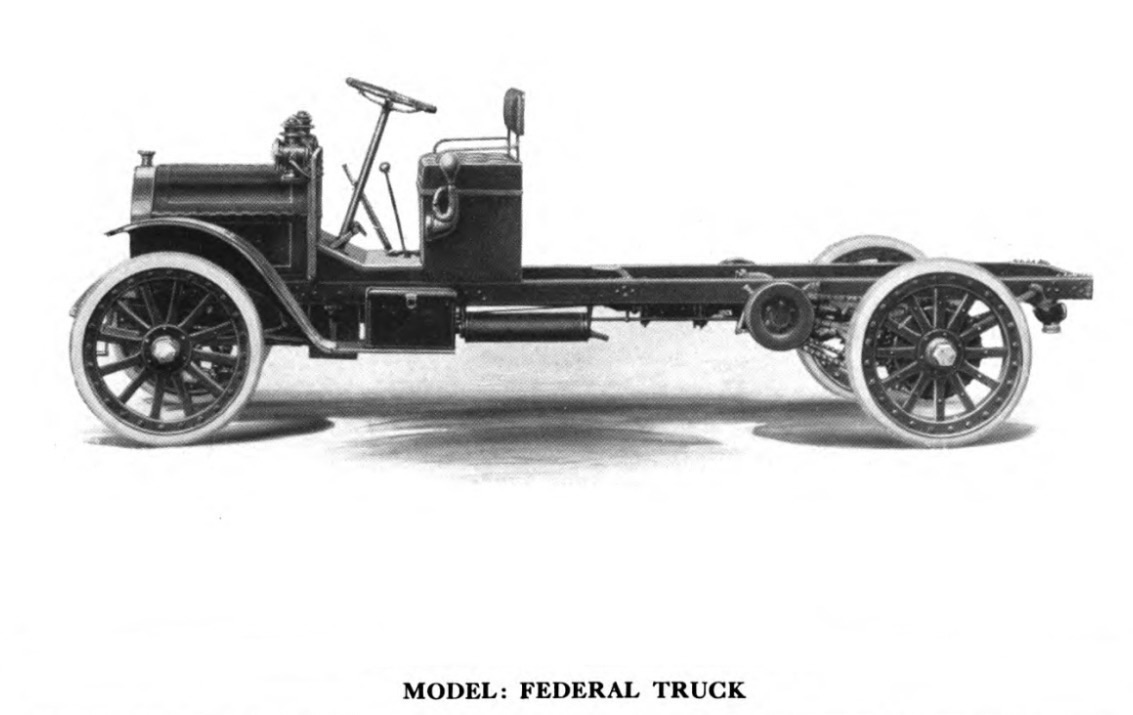
Federal 1,5 t (1914-1918)

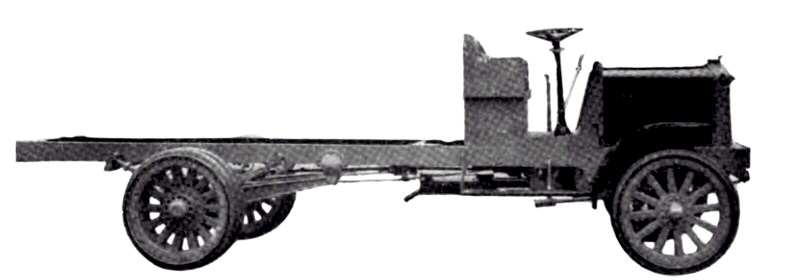
Federal Model L (1916) 3,5 t 40 hp

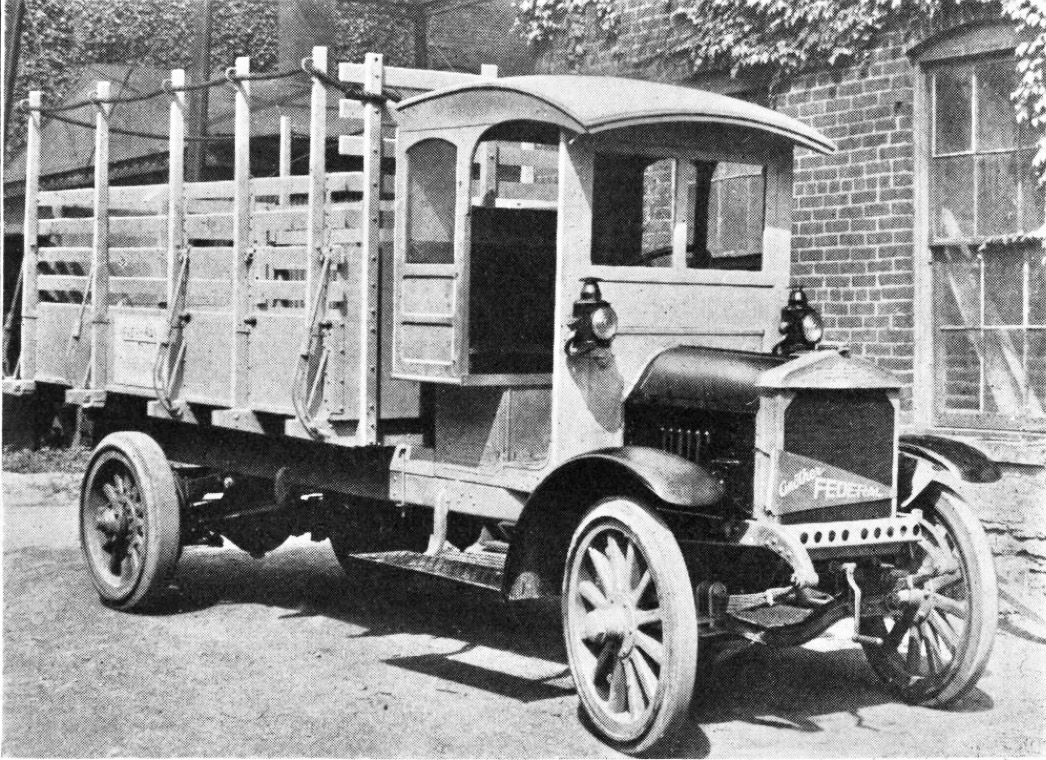
Federal (1920)

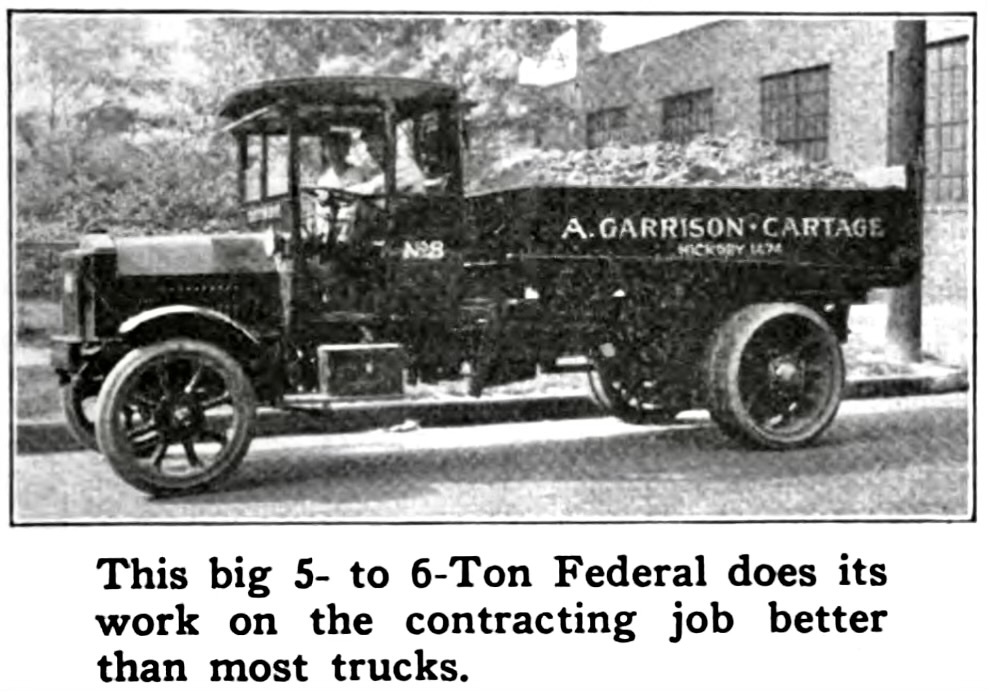
Federal X-2 (1922-1925) 5-6 to

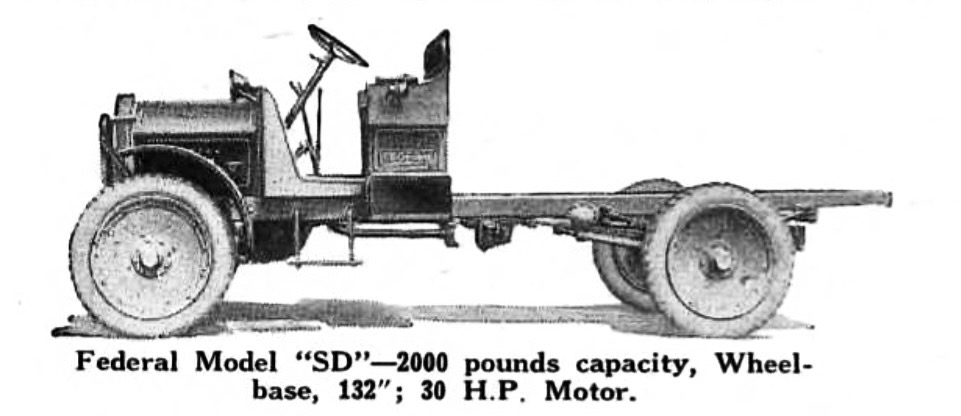
Federal Model SD (1920-1922) 1 to

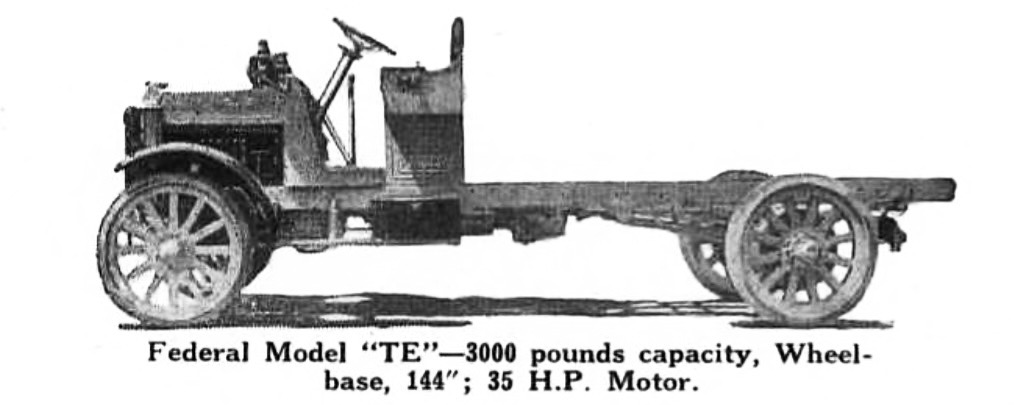
Federal Model TE (1922-1923) 1,5 to

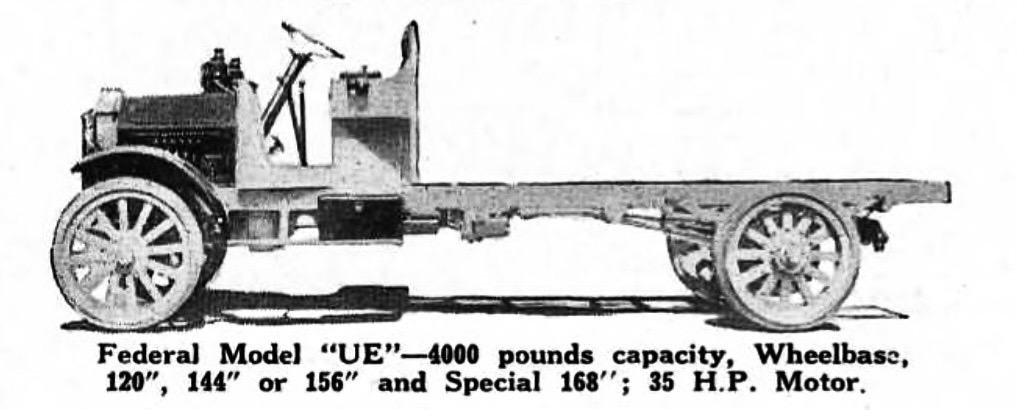
Federal Model UE (1922-1923) 2 to

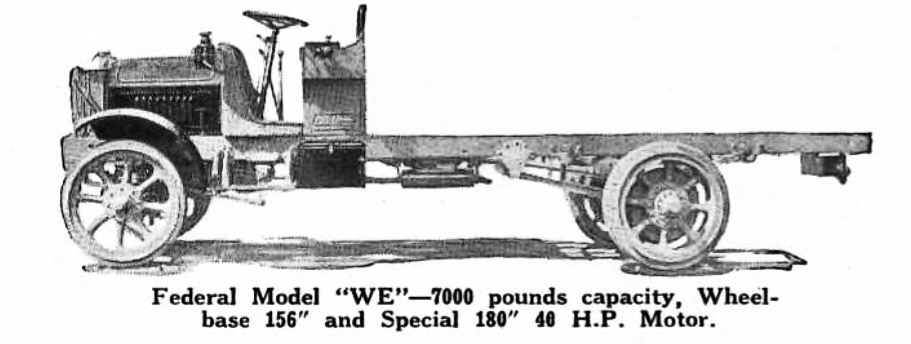
Federal Model WE (1922-1923) 3,5 to

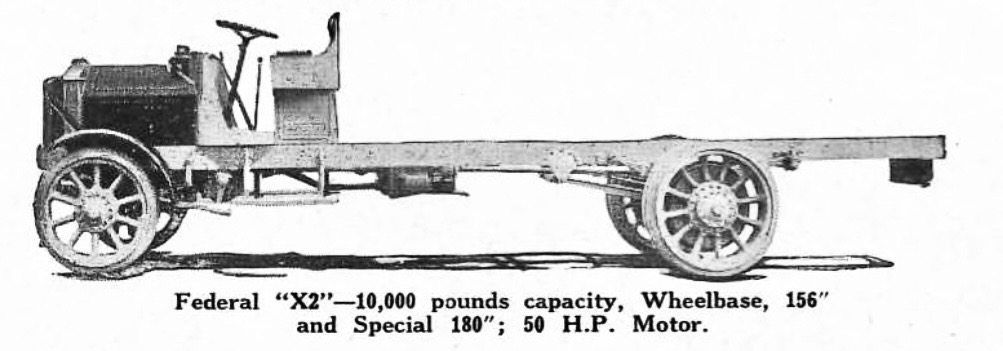
Federal Model X2 (1922-1924) 5 to

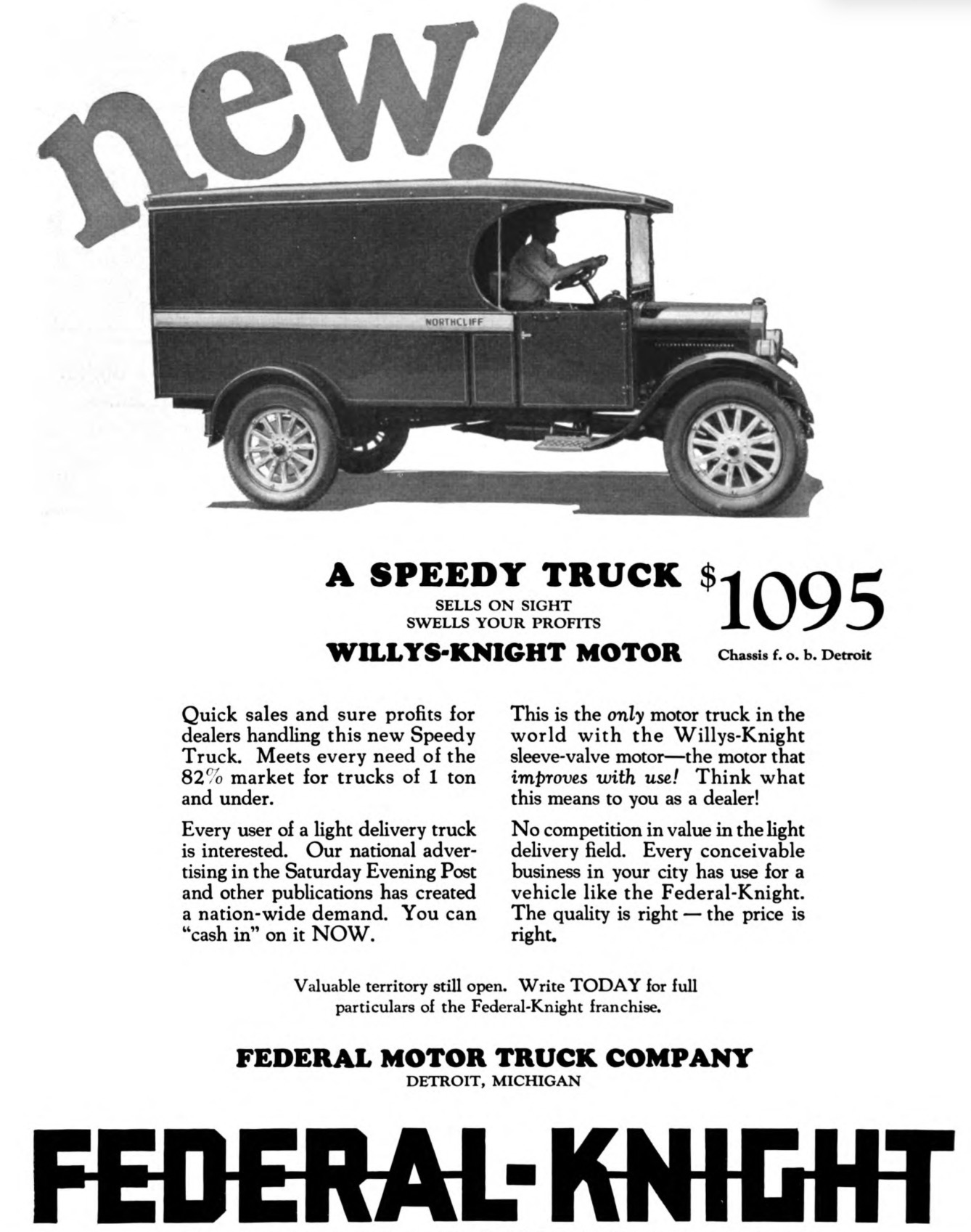
Federal-Knight Speedy Truck (1924-1927)

Federal Speedy Truck advertisement (1925)

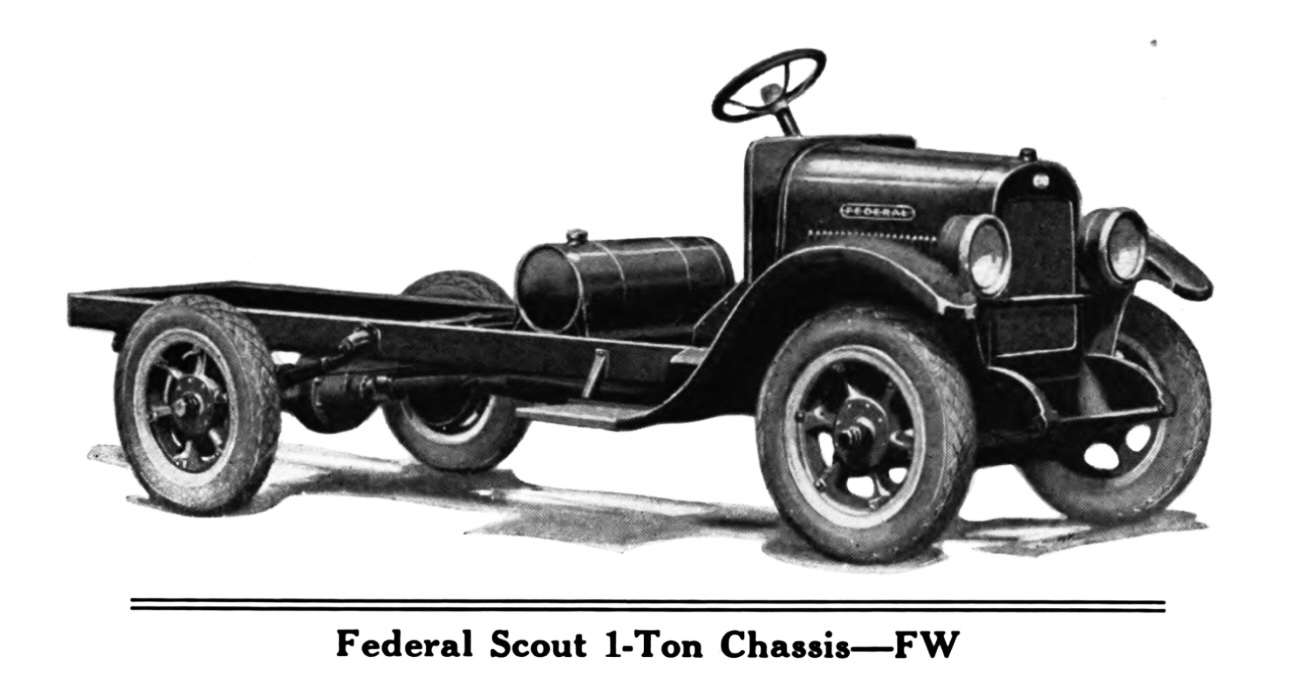
Federal FW (1928)

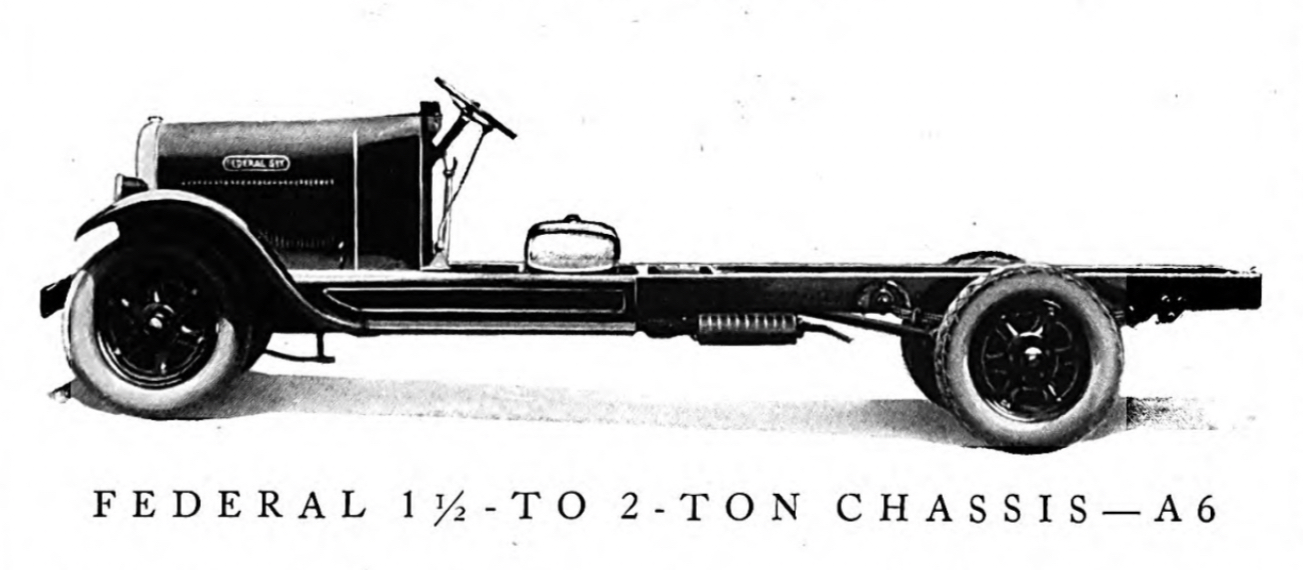
Federal A6 (1929)

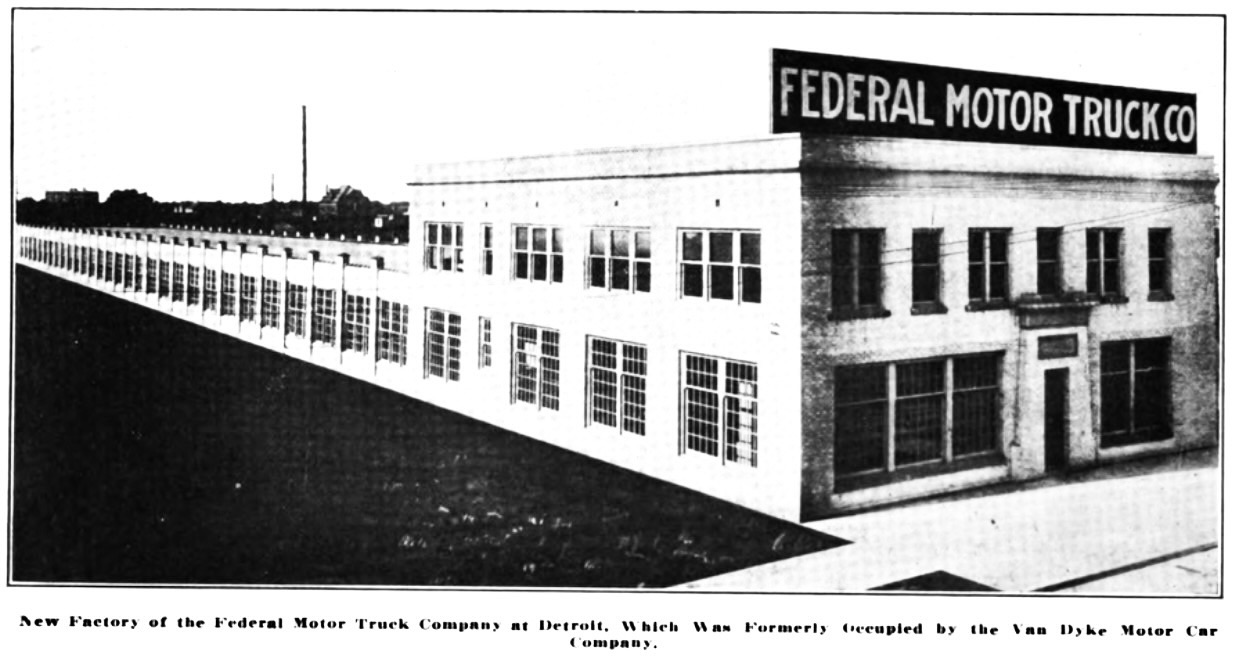
Federal factory (1912)

The company was founded in 1910 as the Bailey Motor Truck Company but was later renamed to Federal. The company then opened a factory in Leavitt Street, near Southwest Detroit. During the prosperous time of the company, around 700 people worked there, producing as many as 3,500 trucks annually. The main competitor of the company was Diamond T. The main providers of engines for the company were Continental, Waukesha, and Hercules. In 1935, Federal sold 2190 units and in 1936 it increased to 2930 trucks. In 1938, Federal sold 1370 units and in 1939 it increased to 1837 trucks.

From 1924 to 1927, the company produced some delivery trucks with Willys-Knight engines, and these were marketed under the Federal Knight brand. Despite being an independent manufacturer, the company produced its own cabs in both standard and deluxe versions. In 1942, the company bought the Stewart Motor Company. After the war, the company enjoyed high sales and was bought by Fawick, although it was soon discovered that the new buyers knew nothing about manufacturing complete trucks, and the company was sold to NAPCO, which closed down the company's factory in Detroit and transferred the trucks' tooling to their own factories in Minneapolis.

Due to economic problems and the uncertainty of the future of the Federal brand, NAPCO retired the brand in 1959, with all operations ceasing in 1960.

== Production ==
Year	Production figures	Model	Load capacity	Serial number
1910			1 to	
1911			1 to	
1912	~ 1,000	C-D	1 to	
1913	~ 2,000		1 to	
1914	905	C-D	1 to	101 to 1005
1915	1,749	G-G-H	1,5 to	1006 to 2754
	↑	J-K	1,5 to	↑
1916		HM	1,5 to	2756 to 4999, 6001 to 6440
		W	2 to	
		L	3,5 to	
1920		SD	1 to	
1921		SD	1 to	
1922		SD	1 to	
		TE	1,5 to	
		UE	2 to	
		WE	3,5 to	
		X-2	5-6 to	
1923	(27,017) from 1910 to 1923		to	
		TE	1,5 to	
		UE	2 to	
		WE	3,5 to	
		X-2	5-6 to	
1924		S-25-6 Speedy Truck	1,5 to	
		S-27 Speedy Truck	2 to	
		X-2	5-6 to	
1925		S-25-6 Speedy Truck	1,5 to	
		S-27 Speedy Truck	2 to	
		X-2	5-6 to	
1926		S-25-6 Speedy Truck	1,5 to	
		S-27 Speedy Truck	2 to	
1927		S-25-6 Speedy Truck	1,5 to	
		S-27 Speedy Truck	2 to	
1928		FW	1 to	
1929		A6	1,5-2 to	
1930			to	
1931			to	
1932			to	
1933			to	
1934			to	
1935	2,190		to	
1936	~ 2,930		to	
1937			to	
1938	~ 1,370		to	
1939	~ 1,837		to	
1940			to	
1941			to	
1942			to	
1943			to	
1944			to	
1945			to	
1946	6,091		to	
1947	10,058		to	
1948	3,898		to	
1949	1,649		to	
1950	1,884		to	
1959			to	
Sum	160,000			

== Model types ==
Trucks with a payload of 1.25 to 1.5 tons

- Type 10-128; Wheelbase 128 inches = 3251 mm
- Type 10-143; Wheelbase 143 inches = 3632 mm
- Type 10-152; Wheelbase 152 inches = 3861 mm

Trucks with a payload of 1.5 to 1.75 tons

- Type 11-128; Wheelbase 128 inches = 3251 mm
- Type 11-143; Wheelbase 143 inches = 3632 mm
- Type 11-152; Wheelbase 152 inches = 3861 mm

Trucks with a payload of 2.5 to 2.75 tons

- Type 15-136; Wheelbase 136 inches = 3454 mm
- Type 15-147; Wheelbase 147 inches = 3734 mm
- Type 15-156; Wheelbase 156 inches = 3962 mm
- Type 15-168; Wheelbase 168 inches = 4267 mm
- Type 15-181; Wheelbase 181 inches = 4597 mm

Trucks with a payload of 2.75 to 3.25 tons

- Type 18-136; Wheelbase 136 inches = 3454 mm
- Type 18-147; Wheelbase 147 inches = 3734 mm
- Type 18-156; Wheelbase 156 inches = 3962 mm
- Type 18-168; Wheelbase 168 inches = 4267 mm
- Type 18-181; Wheelbase 181 inches = 4597 mm

Trucks with a payload of 3.25 to 3.75 tons

- Type 20-136; Wheelbase 136 inches = 3454 mm
- Type 20-147; Wheelbase 147 inches = 3734 mm
- Type 20-156; Wheelbase 156 inches = 3962 mm
- Type 20-168; Wheelbase 168 inches = 4267 mm
- Type 20-181; Wheelbase 181 inches = 4597 mm
- Type 20-195; Wheelbase 195 inches = 4953 mm

With Dieselmotor

  - Type 20DI-136; Wheelbase 136 inches = 3454 mm
  - Type 20DI-147; Wheelbase 147 inches = 3734 mm
  - Type 20DI-156; Wheelbase 156 inches = 3962 mm
  - Type 20DI-168; Wheelbase 168 inches = 4267 mm
  - Type 20DI-181; Wheelbase 181 inches = 4597 mm
  - Type 20DI-195; Wheelbase 195 inches = 4953 mm

Trucks with a payload of 3.5 to 4 tons

- Type 25-147; Wheelbase 147 inches = 3734 mm
- Type 25-156; Wheelbase 156 inches = 3962 mm
- Type 25-168; Wheelbase 168 inches = 4267 mm
- Type 25-181; Wheelbase 181 inches = 4597 mm
- Type 25-195; Wheelbase 195 inches = 4953 mm

With Dieselmotor

  - Type 25DI-147; Wheelbase 147 inches = 3734 mm
  - Type 25DI-156; Wheelbase 156 inches = 3962 mm
  - Type 25DI-168; Wheelbase 168 inches = 4267 mm
  - Type 25DI-181; Wheelbase 181 inches = 4597 mm
  - Type 25DI-195; Wheelbase 195 inches = 4953 mm

Trucks with a payload of 4 to 4.5 tons

- Type 28-147; Wheelbase 147 inches = 3734 mm
- Type 28-156; Wheelbase 156 inches = 3962 mm
- Type 28-168; Wheelbase 168 inches = 4267 mm
- Type 28-181; Wheelbase 181 inches = 4597 mm
- Type 28-195; Wheelbase 195 inches = 4953 mm

With Dieselmotor

  - Type 28DI-147; Wheelbase 147 inches = 3734 mm
  - Type 28DI-156; Wheelbase 156 inches = 3962 mm
  - Type 28DI-168; Wheelbase 168 inches = 4267 mm
  - Type 28DI-181; Wheelbase 181 inches = 4597 mm
  - Type 28DI-195; Wheelbase 195 inches = 4953 mm

Trucks with a payload of 4.25 to 4.75 tons

- Type 29-147; Wheelbase 147 inches = 3734 mm
- Type 29-156; Wheelbase 156 inches = 3962 mm
- Type 29-168; Wheelbase 168 inches = 4267 mm
- Type 29-181; Wheelbase 181 inches = 4597 mm
- Type 29-195; Wheelbase 195 inches = 4953 mm

With Dieselmotor

  - Type 29DI-147; Wheelbase 147 inches = 3734 mm
  - Type 29DI-156; Wheelbase 156 inches = 3962 mm
  - Type 29DI-168; Wheelbase 168 inches = 4267 mm
  - Type 29DI-181; Wheelbase 181 inches = 4597 mm
  - Type 29DI-195; Wheelbase 195 inches = 4953 mm

Bus Types

- B15-156 for 18 to 20 Passengers
- B15-181 for 22 to 24 Passengers
- B20-181 for 24 Passengers (also with Dieselmotor)
- B20-195 for 26 Passengers (also with Dieselmotor)
- B25-195 for 26 to 28 Passengers (also with Dieselmotor)
- B25-207 for 28 to 30 Passengers (also with Dieselmotor)

== Military trucks ==
Federal built its first U.S. military trucks in 1918 for the U.S. Army. More diverse military (tractor) trucks, including tank transporters, dump trucks, and heavy wreckers, were built for U.S. forces from 1933 through 1945. Federal produced over 10,000 trucks for the military.

== Gallery ==
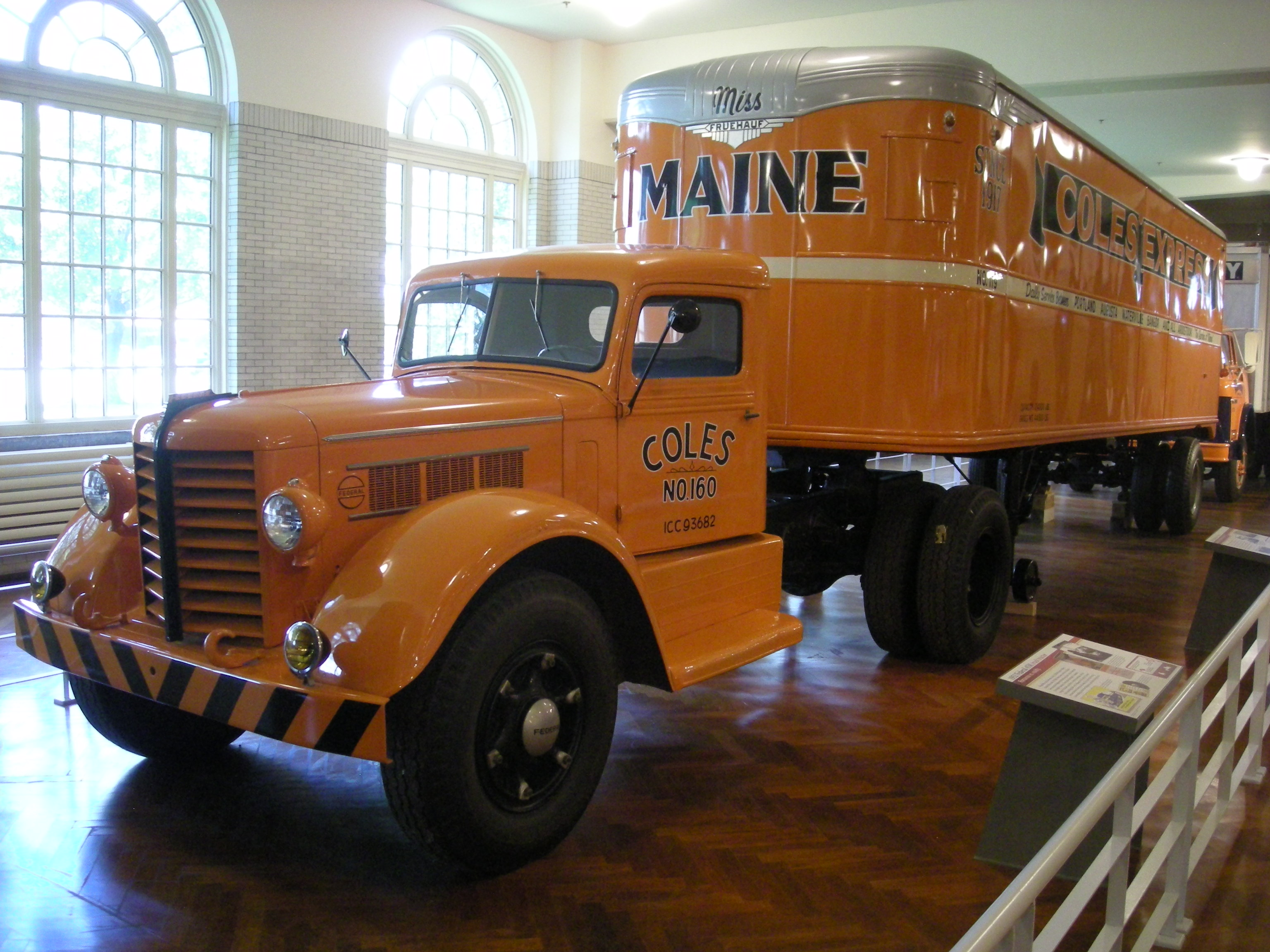
1952 Federal 45M tractor with 1946 Fruehauf semi-trailer (Henry Ford Museum)

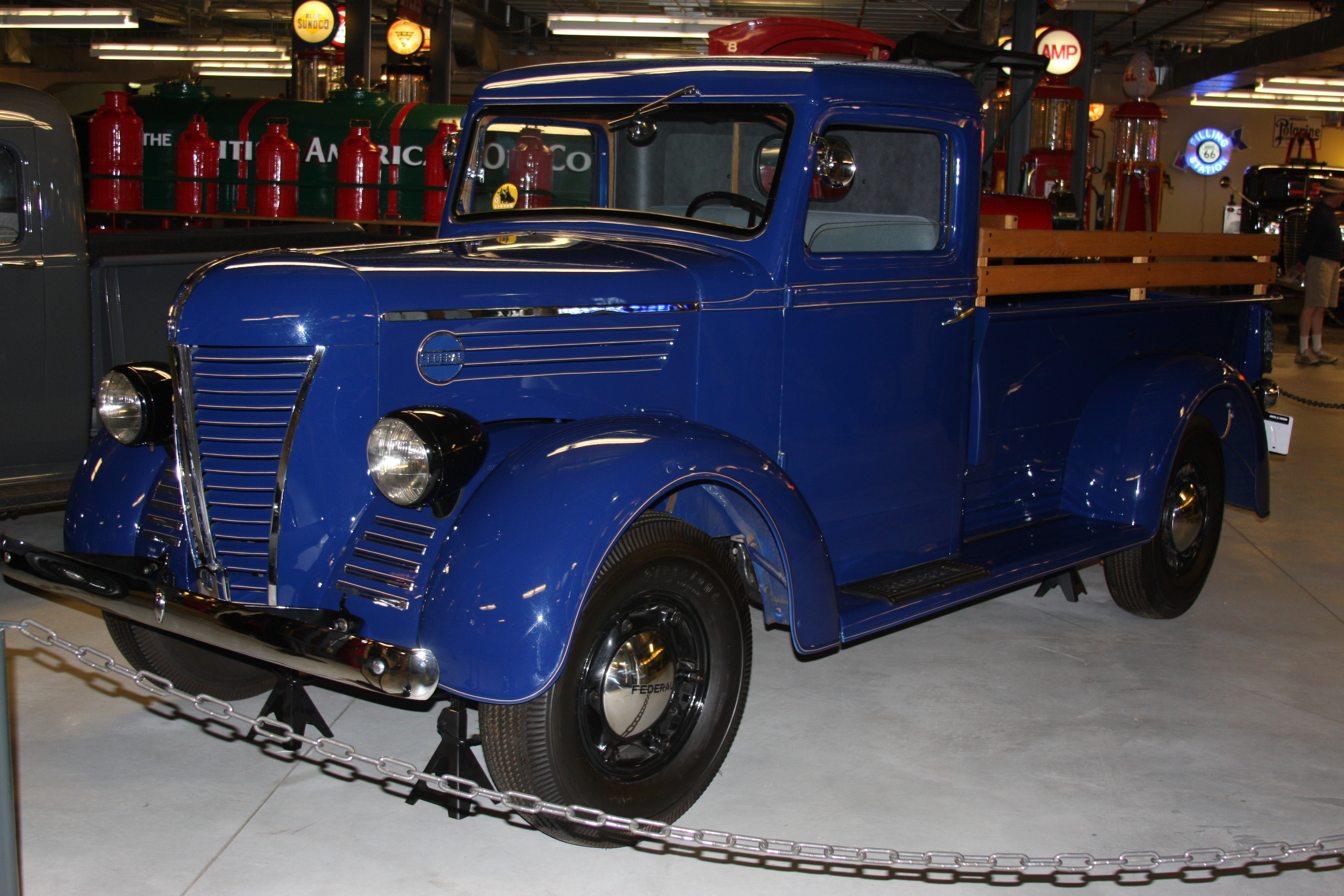
A Federal light pickup truck

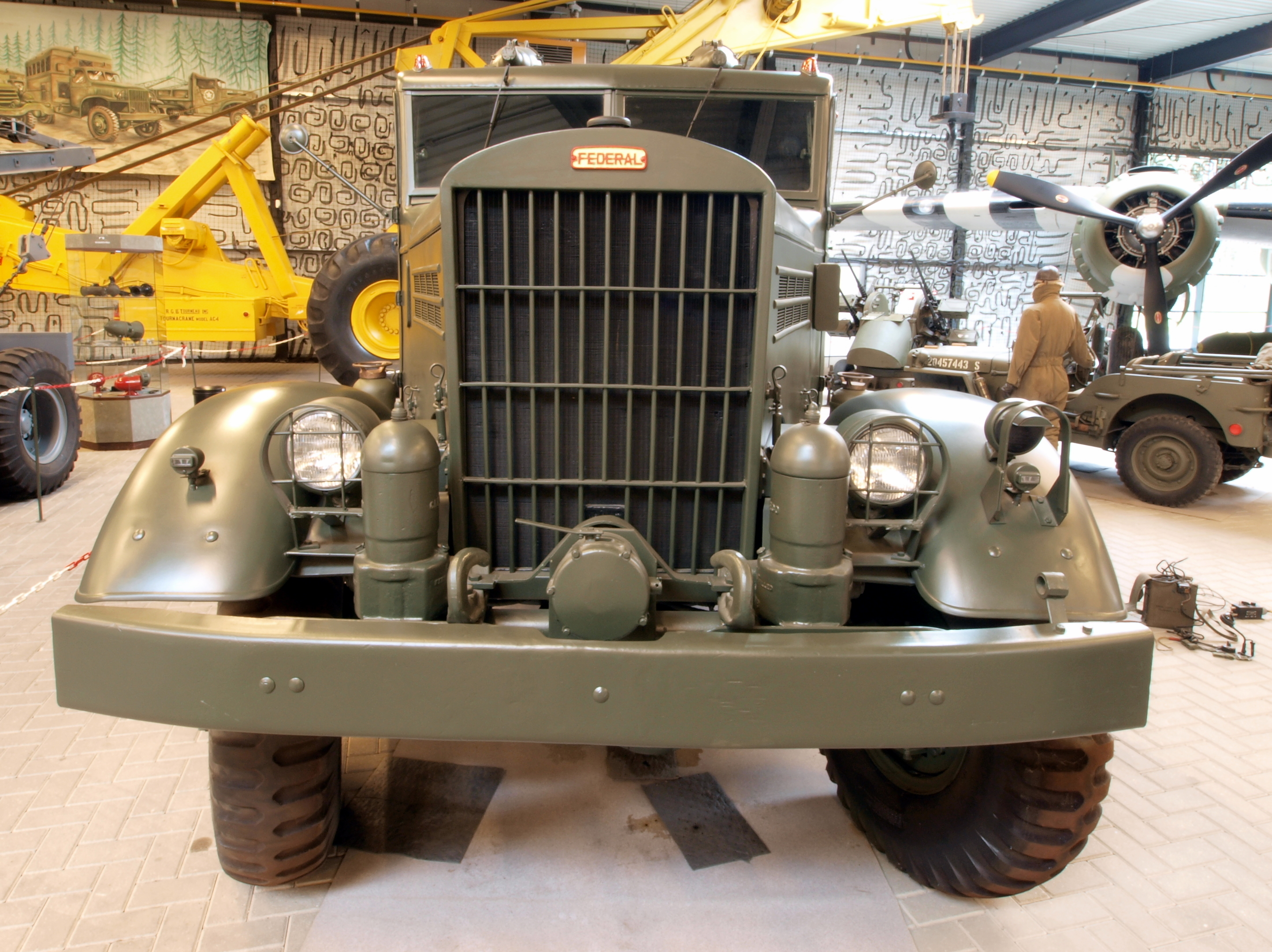
WWII Federal G-692, 7½-ton, 6x6, military wrecker in the Overloon War Museum (Netherlands)

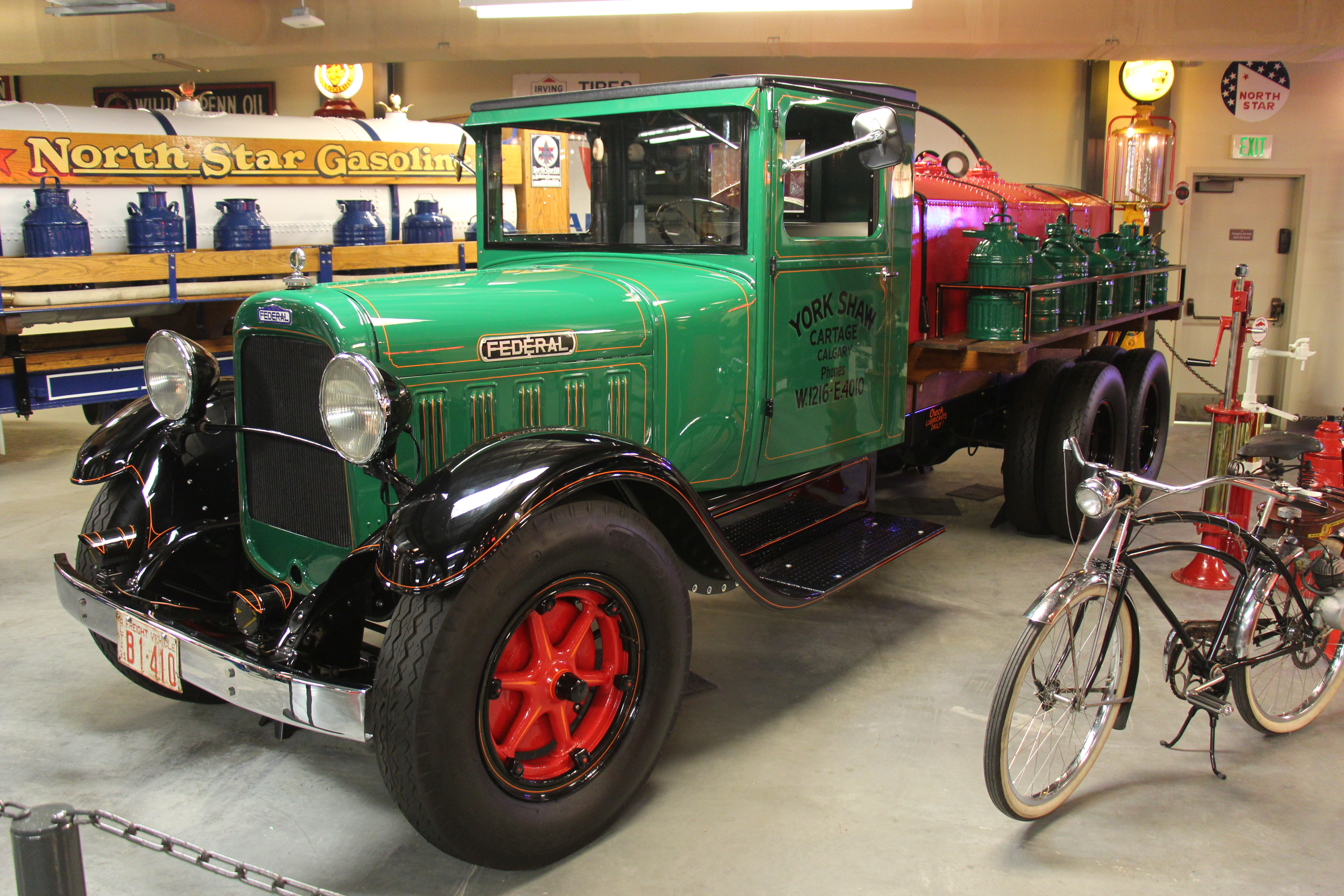
A 1932 Federal truck

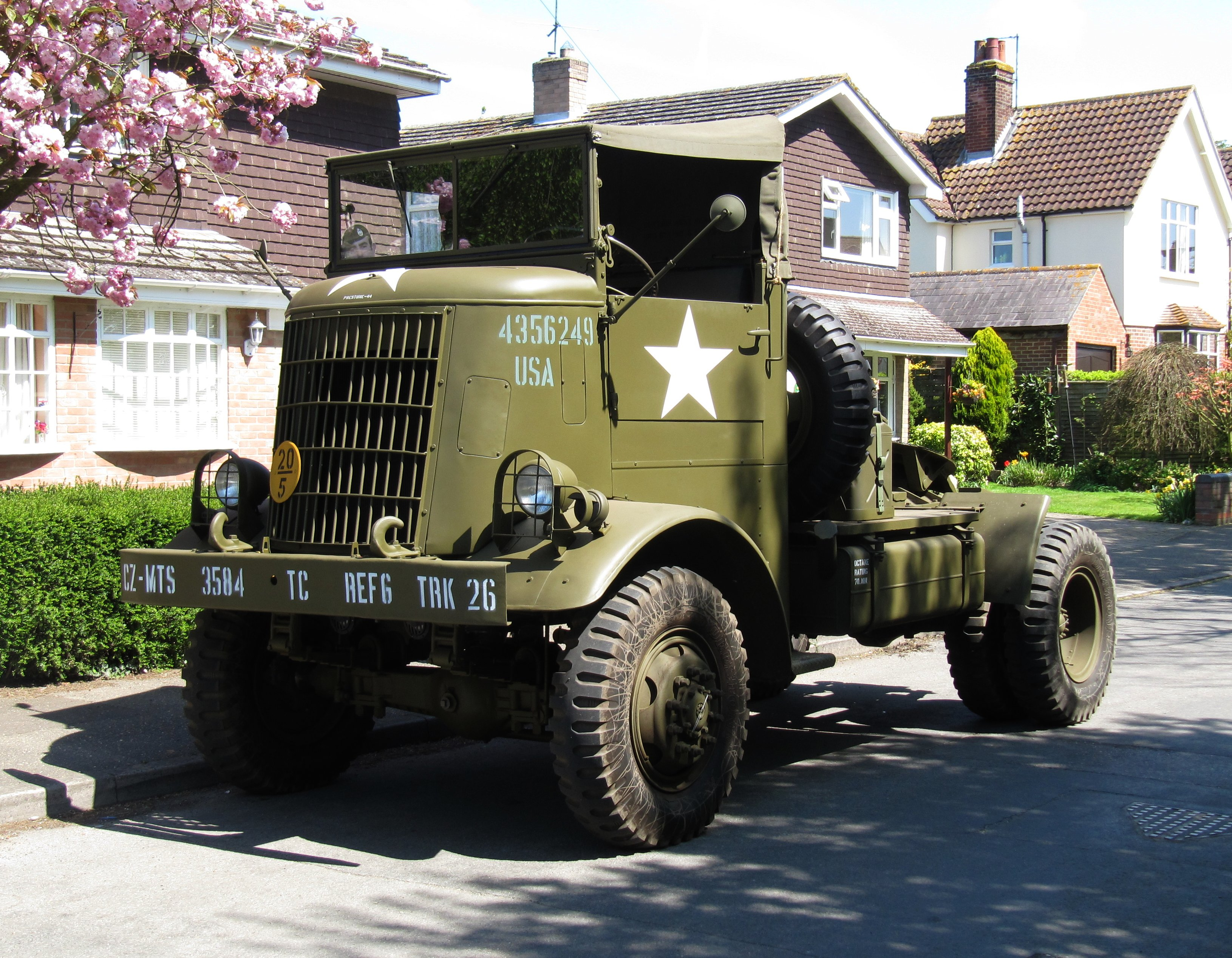
A Federal military truck
