= Napco Four Wheel Drive Vehicles =

Automobile parts manufacturer in Minnesota

NAPCO (Northwestern Auto Parts Company) was a four-wheel drive (4x4) vehicle parts manufacturing company founded in 1918 and based in Minneapolis, Minnesota USA. Besides four-wheel drive units, NAPCO also provided winches, auxiliary transmissions, tandem drive axles, hydrovac systems, and dump truck bodies.

In a partnership with Sherman Products Inc., NAPCO also produced a Front Wheel Drive (FWD) Assist kit for Ford 600 and 800 series tractors in the mid-1950s. Marketed under the name Sherman NAPCO, the kit did not sell in large numbers, as it was competing with the more known Elenco FWD Assist which is also uncommon to find.

The 4x4 business was eventually acquired by Dana Corporation, but the company survives as NAPCO International and still produces parts and equipment for the military.

== Pre-War 4x4 ==
Four Wheel Drive vehicles have been around since the 1890s, but were generally unheard of before World War II. The most well-known early American manufacturer was the Four Wheel Drive Auto Company, which began production in 1909. Marmon-Herrington conversion units were installed into Ford trucks in the late 1930s, but it was an expensive and time-consuming effort resulting in few conversions.

== 1939-1945 War Effort ==
Like many USA companies during World War II, NAPCO refocused their operation on producing specialized automotive parts and assemblies for USA military contractors and vehicles.

Overseas, soldiers were driving Jeeps and experiencing the versatility and usefulness of four-wheel-drive. They realized the advantages 4x4 vehicles could offer for construction, farming, logging, prospecting, ranching, sportsmen, and simply exploring the backwoods. They wanted 4x4 in their civilian trucks when they returned home.

The US Army sought rapid production of a lightweight reconnaissance car. Production of the Willys MB, better known as the Jeep, began in 1941. By 1945, over 650,000 military Jeeps had been manufactured, and subsequent Willys/Jeep production was almost exclusively four-wheel drive.

== 1947-1955 Powr-Pak Kits ==
Of the Big Three USA automakers, only Dodge responded quickly to the demand, introducing the first civilian production 4x4 truck with their military-type WW2 proven medium-duty Power Wagon in 1946.

After the war, NAPCO shifted again to produce peacetime machinery. As early as 1947, NAPCO began manufacturing an aftermarket 4x4 Conversion Kit they named Powr-Pak, that could be bolted onto any truck chassis equipped with Hotchkiss drive. Powr-pak versions were built that fit Dodge, Ford, General Motors (Chevrolet and GMC), and Studebaker trucks, but the bulk of the Powr-Paks sold ended up on GM's 3/4 and 1-ton pickups (no 1/2-tons, since they used an incompatible Torque tube until 1955).

The transfer case was a Spicer unit with optional Dual-Range Hi-Lo, but the rest of the Powr-pak kit (85%) consisted of readily available Chevrolet parts (wheels, drum brake assembly, front axle, leaf springs, shock absorbers, driveshafts and universal joints). One notable feature was the "shift on the fly" rubber mounted transfer case that provided a smoother ride. Powr-pak offered options for Hi-Lo dual-range and Power take-off (PTO). NAPCO also offered an assortment of winches, auxiliary transmissions, and other truck parts.

The Powr-Pak kit was shipped in a crate measuring 80"x30"x26" and weighing 1,410 pounds. It could be easily installed by an owner or a dealer, requiring as few as 4 holes to be drilled in the chassis. In as little as 3 hours, a full-size truck could be converted into a 4x4 "Mountain Goat" that would climb steep inclines with ease. Just as easily, the kit could be removed and re-used on another truck, and this was used as a selling point.

The retail price of NAPCO Powr-Pak kit in 1955 was $995. Many companies would install them, the price rising from $1250 to $1550 with labor, bringing the total price for a new GM pickup from $1,548.96 for 2WD to as low as $2,796.96 for 4WD.

In the 1950s the NAPCO became a publicly traded stock company and changed its name to NAPCO Industries, reflecting its change of focus from wholesale supplier to manufacturer. In addition to manufacturing, the company began tracking availability of blue prints, vendors, and prices of all the equipment requested by its worldwide customers.

== 1956-1959 GM Factory Installed Option ==
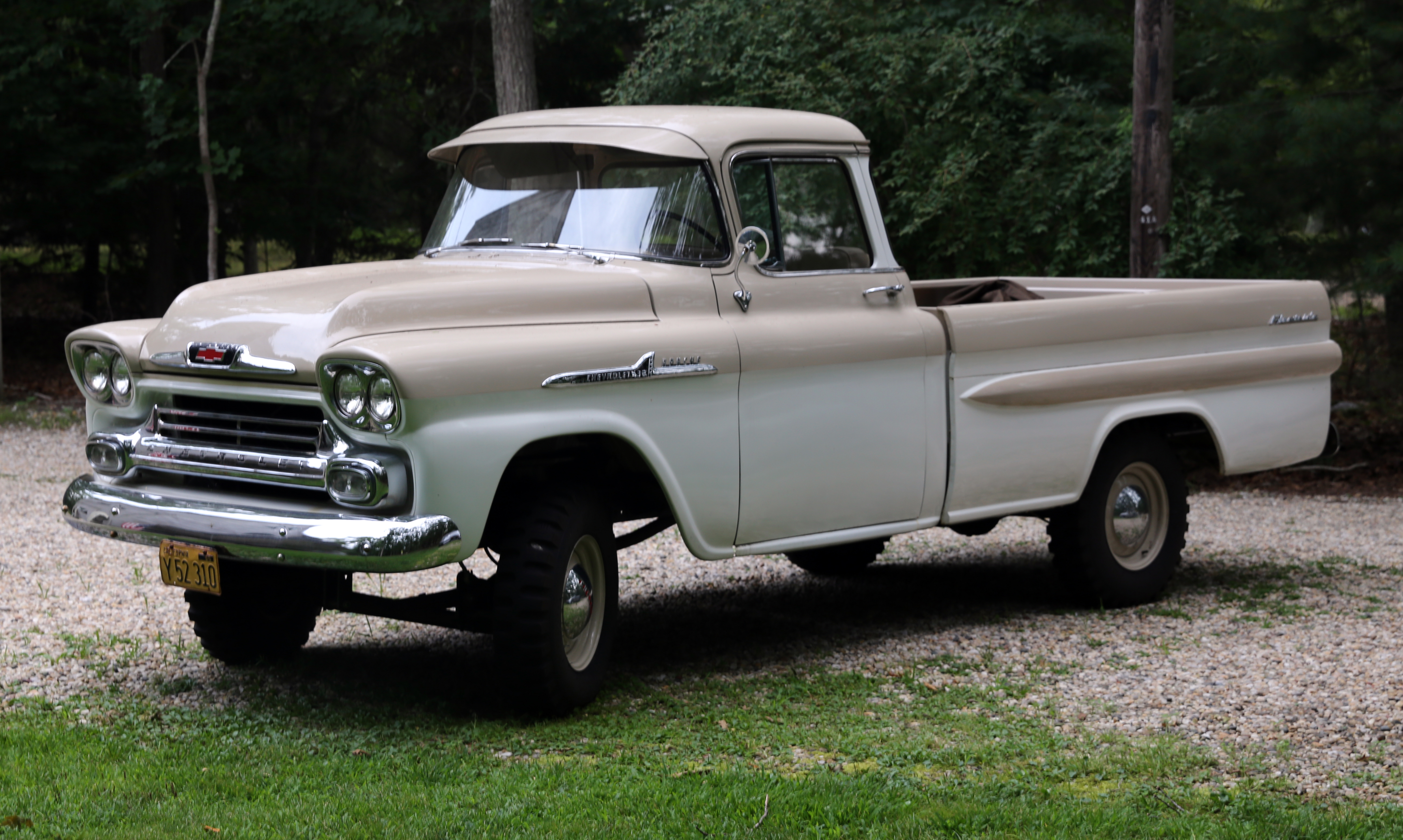
A 1958 Chevrolet Apache pickup truck with the NAPCO Powr-Pak conversion

GM redesigned their truck line mid-year in 1955, and soon offered the Powr-Pak as a factory-installed option; this reduced the purchase price and increased the number of sales by the dealerships. GMC was first in 1956, and Chevrolet followed in 1957, assigning it a Regular Production Option number (RPO 690). The 1957 Chevrolet and GMC 3100 4×4 price was a bargain at $2549.00 compared to the earlier add on kits.

== 1960 GM Produces Its Own 4x4 ==
GM redesigned their truck line again in 1960, this time with an Independent Front Suspension (IFS) that wasn't compatible with the existing Powr-Pak kits.[1] So, GM began producing their own 4x4 design in-house, and parted ways with NAPCO.

Losing that much business was devastating. NAPCO continued making 4x4 kits for a few more years, then refocused on heavy-duty trucks, 1 1/2 tons and larger. Eventually, NAPCO sold the rights to their 4x4 business to Dana, a manufacturer of transfer cases and Spicer brand driveline components. All the archives, documentation and parts were all absorbed by DANA, who originally produced the transfer case for the Powr-Pak.

== Epilogue ==
60 years later, NAPCO trucks are still considered durable and very versatile, and are highly desired collectibles. The exact number of Powr-Paks sold for all the brands is uncertain, but is thought to be under 2,000 (NAPCO record-keeping wasn't precise).

== Other early 4×4 manufacturers (factory and conversion kits) ==
- Marmon-Herrington in Indianapolis equipped 1940s and 1950s Ford pickup trucks with 4 wheel drive.
- Willys Overland along with Ford built the Willys MB Jeep working from designs by the American Bantam Car Company. After W.W.II, Willys-Overland built the CJ series and Willys Wagons, among others.
- Chrysler Motor Corporation's Dodge Trucks World War II Power Wagon.

== See also ==
Four-wheel drive layout
