= Allwork tractors =

Tractor manufacturers of the United States

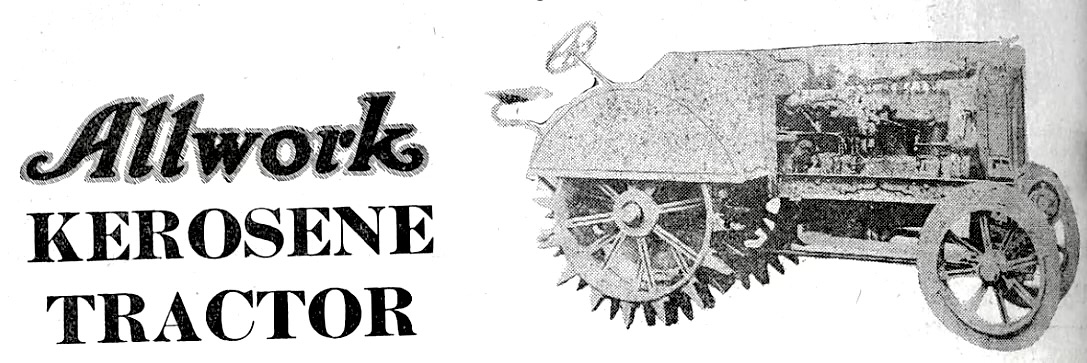
Allwork C 14-28 (1916-1923)

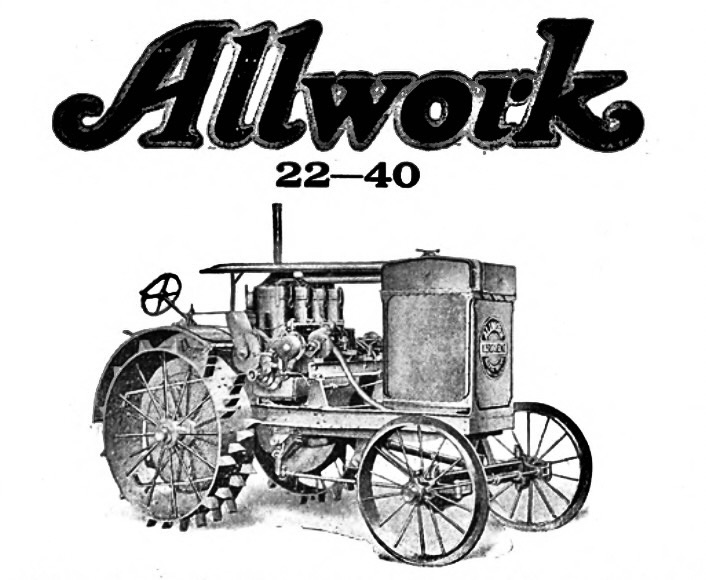
Allwork 22-40 (1924-1929)

Allwork tractors were manufactured by the Electric Wheel Company of Quincy, Illinois. Electric Wheel Co. was acquired by the Firestone Tire and Rubber Company. The All Work II Model F was a lightweight tractor with a big surplus of power for general farming and orchard work. This tractor was fueled by kerosene.

In 1919, 66 tractors were sold in California; by 1920, it was already 431 units.

== Allwork 14-28 ==
- Manufacturer................................Electric Wheel Co Quincy Illinois
- Nebraska test number........................53
- Test date...................................August 16-September 14, 1920
- Test tractor serial number..................5043
- Years produced .............................1918-1923
- Engine......................................Electric Wheel Co. vertical L-head
- Cylinders...................................4
- Bore and stroke (inches)....................5.00x6.00
- Rated rpm...................................900
- Displacement (c.i.).........................471.3
- Fuel........................................kerosine/gasoline
- Fuel tank capacity (gallons)................25
- Auxiliary tank capacity (gallons)...........5
- Carburetor..................................Kingston E
- Air cleaner.................................Bennett
- Ignition....................................Kingston L magneto
- Cooling capacity (gallons)..................13

=== Maximum brake horsepower tests ===
- PTO/belt horsepower........................28.86
- Crankshaft rpm.............................915
- Fuel use (gallons per hour)................4.95

=== Maximum drawbar horsepower tests ===
- Gear.......................................low
- Drawbar horsepower.........................19.69
- Pull weight (pounds).......................3,950
- Speed......................................1.87
- Percent slippage...........................15.10
- SAE drawbar horsepower.....................14
- SAE belt/PTO horsepower....................28
- Type.......................................4
- Front wheel (inches).......................steel: 32x6
- Rear wheel (inches)........................steel: 48x12
- Length (inches)............................125
- Height (inches)............................69
- Rear width (inches)........................79
- Weight (pounds)............................5,000
- Gear/speed (miles per hour)................forward: 1/1.75, 2/2.50; reverse 1/1.75
