= Kapuni Branch =

Railway line

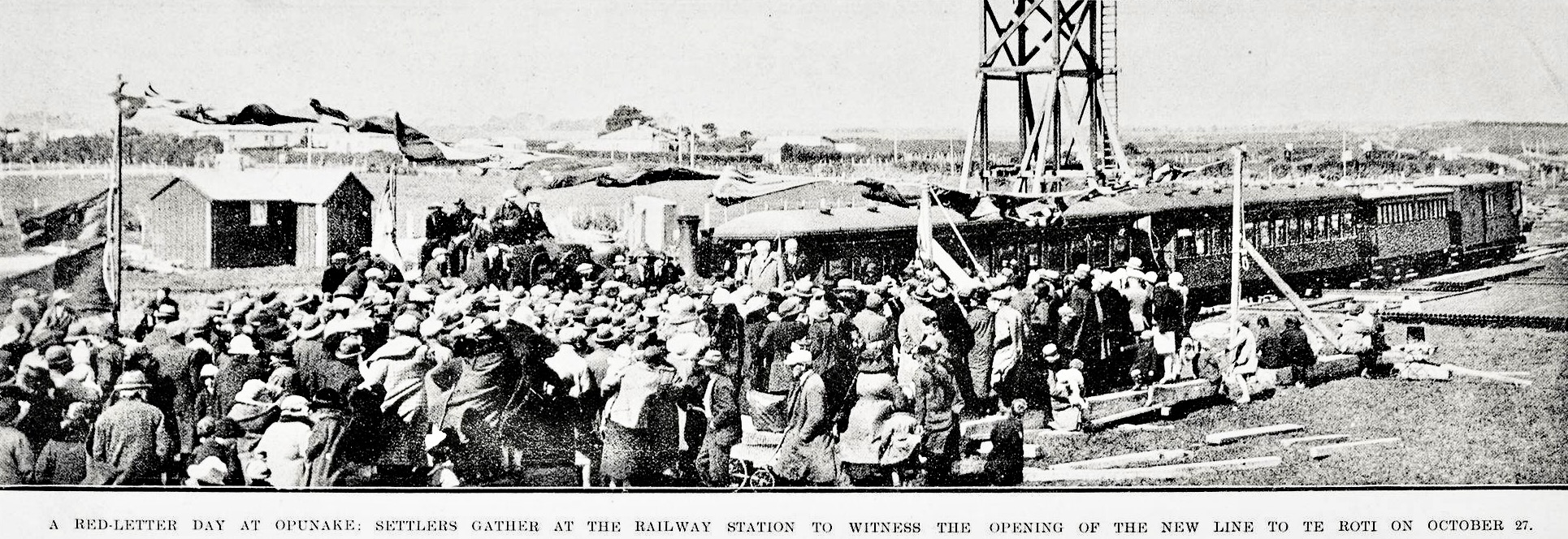
- Ōpunake railway station opening day 1925

Overview
- Other name(s): Opunake Branch; Kapuni Industrial Railway
- Status: Open
- Owner: KiwiRail
- Termini: Te Roti; Kapuni
- Connecting lines: Marton–New Plymouth line
- Stations: 2

Service
- Operator: KiwiRail

History
- Work began: 28 May 1914
- Opened: 12 July 1926
- Closed beyond Kapuni: 31 July 1976

Technical
- Line length: 11.76 km (7.31 mi) was 36.4 km (22.6 mi)
- Number of tracks: Single
- Character: Rural
- Track gauge: 1,067 mm (3 ft 6 in)

Map

The Kapuni Branch, formerly known as the Opunake Branch, is a branch railway in North Island, New Zealand. It opened in 1926, and ran 36.4 km across the southern slopes of Mount Taranaki to link the rural town of Ōpunake with the Marton–New Plymouth Line 2 km north of the small rural settlement of Te Roti, equidistant between Eltham and Hāwera. With the decline of rural freight, part of the line was closed in 1976, but the 10.9 km section to Kapuni was retained and upgraded to service traffic to the Kapuni natural gas field.

== Early surveys ==
When the plains of South Taranaki were being laid out, provision had been made for a railway line between Eltham and Ōpunake and a railway reserve set aside in an almost straight line between these centres. However, initial route surveys conducted in 1908 concluded that this reserve was "a little too far to the north to serve the country generally in the most efficient manner" and new surveys were conducted to find a more suitable route across the plains.

The four routes surveyed were:

- Ōpunake to Stratford
- Ōpunake to Hāwera
- Ōpunake to Eltham
- Ōpunake to Te Roti

The route from Te Roti was ultimately chosen as being the most direct and least expensive option. It also took a more central route over the plains, creating a shorter journey for coastal farms to access the railway.

== Construction ==
The branch line came about as a result of an election promise at the 1911 New Zealand general election. In April 1912 a Government Commission recommended serving the area west of the Hawera-New Plymouth main line with a line from New Plymouth via the coast to Opunake, and over Waimate Plains, to join the main line 54 ch (1,100 m) west of Te Roti, with a Kapuni to Kaponga (and possibly to Stratford) branch and from Kapuni to Manaia, a total of 72 1/2 mi (116.7 km), estimated to cost £539,000.

A branch line of "about 23 miles" to Ōpunake was authorised in 1912 for £400,000 by the Railways Authorization Act 1912, with work commencing in 1914. The new Reform government decided the commission's plan was too costly and instead, in 1914, authorised a 21 mi 17 ch (34.1 km) branch to Opunake, with a branch to Manaia. The first sod was cut at Opunake on 28 May 1914.

Earthworks reached Kapuni by 1916, but progress was slowed by World War I. Work was suspended in December 1917, by which time bridges over the Waingongoro River (a concrete arch, changed from steel due to wartime shortage) and Mangatoki, and Kapuni streams were well under way. The other bridges were plate girders with concrete piers, though a cement shortage delayed bridge and culvert construction. Seven bridges crossed the Waiaua River and Punehu, Taungatara, Mangahume, Oeo and Ouri Streams. There were 3 road overbridges. In 1917 the survey for the 59 mi (95 km) line from Opunake to Moturoa was completed, but it was not built. Work resumed in March 1919. At the peak 200 men were employed on line works, including a large 1.6 km cutting near Waiteika. A Whittaker steam navvy (from Cass) and a Marion steam shovel worked in the larger cuttings. The Kapuni section was completed in 1920.

The Public Works Department began running goods trains to Kapuni from 1 August 1923, and to Mangawhero Road by December 1924. The Ōpunake terminal was reached on 8 June 1925. On 12 July 1926 the Railways Department took over the line. A construction train was derailed by a cow in March 1925 and the guard was killed and 3 other workers injured. The railway was officially opened by the Prime Minister, Robert Coates, on 27 October 1925.

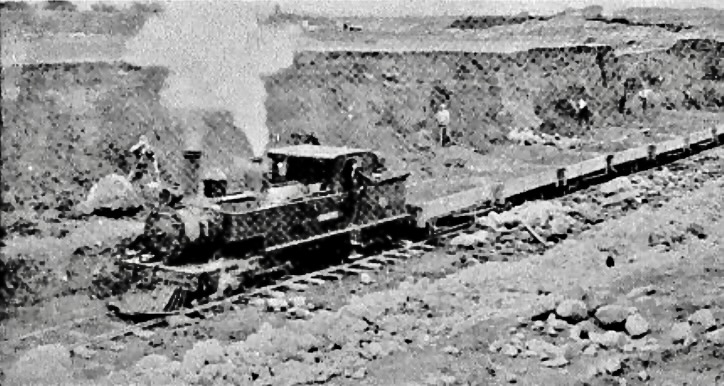
Kaupokonui ballast pit about 1923

=== Manaia siding ===
A 9 km spur from Kapuni to Manaia was built in 1920–24, but track was only laid as far as a ballast pit on the Kaupokonui River, and the section as far as the ballast pit was closed and the track lifted by 1926.

== Operations ==
When the branch was opened to Ōpunake in 1926 services consisted of one return service three days a week, running on Monday, Wednesday & Friday. Services were run as mixed services, with passenger accommodation included attached to the end of the freight train.

Maximum speed was 30 mph (48 km/h). Services departed Hāwera at 9:30am, reaching Ōpunake 90 minutes later. Return services departed at 11:45am reaching Hāwera at 1:42pm. There was no stationmaster assigned to Ōpunake station initially, despite the large station building provided. From 13 March 1931 there was a caretaker and from 22 June 1942 a stationmaster.

By 1930 goods traffic had increased and an extra service was scheduled for Thursdays as well. As well as general freight and livestock, a number of smaller dairy factories along the line provided good traffic at this time. Road competition for freight from these dairy companies ramped up from the 1940s with several dairy companies preferring to truck produce directly to New Plymouth.

=== Passenger services ===
Regular passenger numbers were never high - the first official train service started with only 3 people. As early as 1930 there were recommendations to remove passenger accommodation to save costs. Passenger services endured on the branch until 16 October 1955 (or 31 October), when services became freight-only. Trains in 1955 left Hawera at 9.03am, arrived at Opunake at 11.15, returned at 12.40pm and arrived at Hawera at 3.3 p.m.

Excursion trains were popular in the late 1920s and early 1930s with trains from Whanganui, New Plymouth and Waitara visiting. The first such train was a race train that ran to Pihama station on 18 March 1925 - over a year before the branch was officially completed. An excursion from New Plymouth in 1967 took about 2½ hours each way.

== Motive power ==
The first official train to Opunake was hauled by a W^{w} class tank engine. Later A^{B} class tender engines became the usual motive power until the end of steam power in Taranaki in late 1966.

From December 1966, D^{B} class diesel locomotives became the primary motive power used (introduced a few weeks after the nearby Waitara Branch railway). By the 1980s they had in turn been replaced with DC class diesel locomotives running as far as Kapuni, the new end of the line.Stations

The following stations were located on the Opunake Branch. All stations closed to passenger traffic on 31 Oct 1955.

Station Name	Distance	Opened	Closed Freight
Te Roti Junction	0 km	18 June 1881	30 October 1967
Matapu	4.89 km	12 July 1926	21 August 1969
Duthie Road	7.18 km	12 July 1926	28 January 1978
Palmer Road	8.99 km	12 July 1926	31 October 1955
Kapuni	11.73 km	12 July 1926	22 September 1989*
Mangawhero Road	17.04 km	12 July 1926	1 April 1973
Auroa Road	19.98 km	12 July 1926	31 March 1976
Pihama	27.28 km	12 July 1926	31 July 1976
Punehu	27.73 km	12 July 1926	21 August 1965
Waiteika	33.03 km	12 July 1926	21 August 1965
Opunake	36.41 km	12 July 1926	31 July 1976

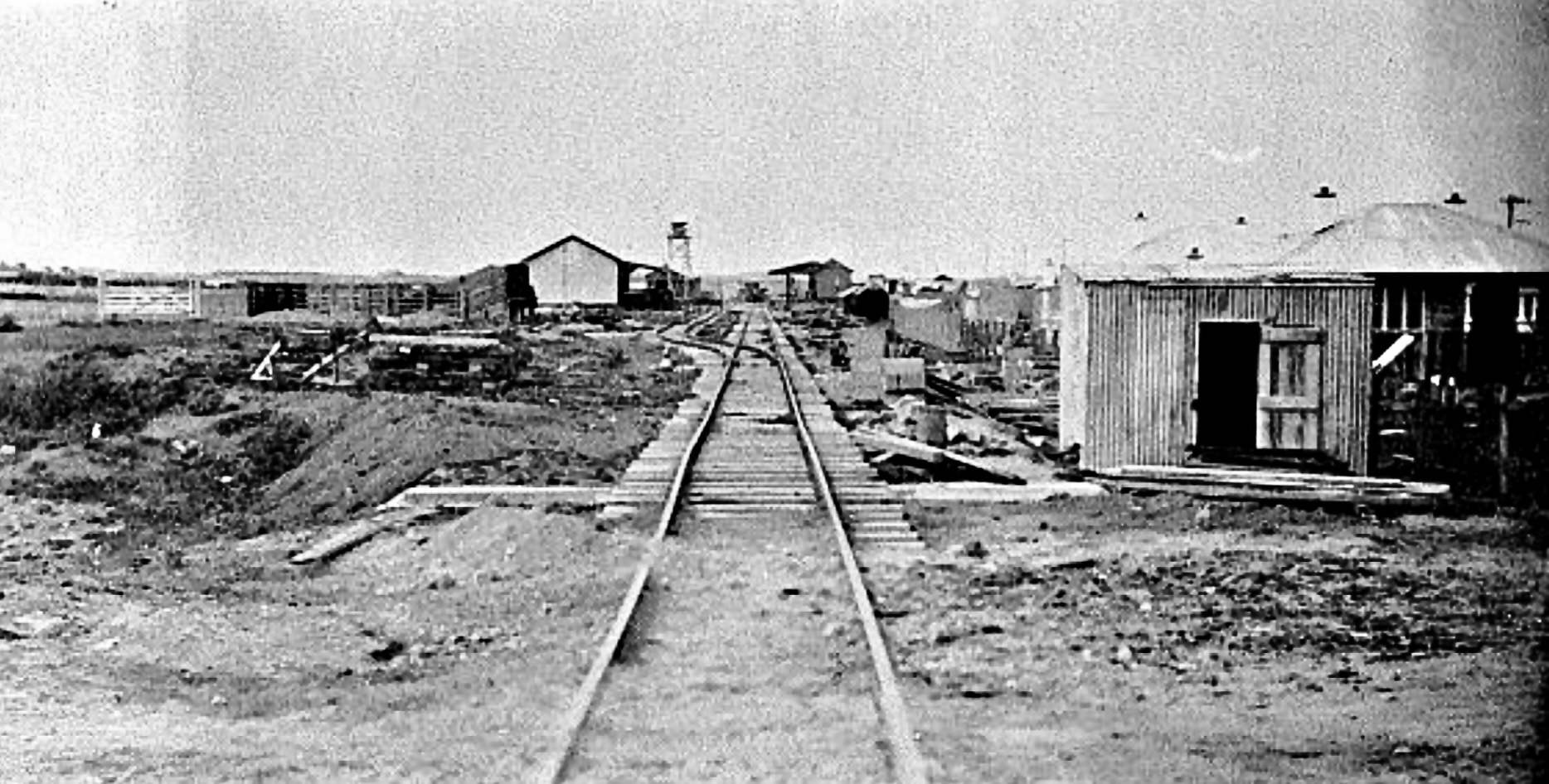
Ōpunake station in 1925

The railway station building in Opunake was a Class A lean-to building, complete with general and ladies waiting rooms and space for a station office. It and a 60 ft (18 m) x 30 ft (9.1 m) goods shed and a lamp and footwarmer shed were built by J W Boon, of Stratford, by July 1925. He also built 3 railway houses in 1925/26. By 1926 there were also a platform, cart approach, loading bank, stockyards, an engine shed, 55 foot turntable (built at Addington Workshops about February 1926 and still in use in 1966) and sidings able to hold 60, 30, 26, 23 and 18 wagons, reduced to 55, 31 and 17 by 1959.

=== Te Roti Junction ===
The junction with the Marton - New Plymouth railway line faced south towards Hāwera with trains operating from that station. The station of Te Roti was rebuilt as an island station and the branch ran parallel to the mainline for around half a mile north of the station, before swinging hard left to cross the Waingongoro river bridge round a 6 1/2 ch (130 m) curve. All other curves were easy and grades were no more than 1 in 100, except 1 in 70 from Te Roti to Matapu for Opunake bound trains.

On 14 May 1961 the junction was realigned with points facing toward Eltham and services operated from Stratford instead. The Hāwera locomotive depot was closed around the same time, and Te Roti station itself closed in 1967.

== Closure beyond Kapuni ==
The 1952 Royal Commission of Inquiry into New Zealand Government Railways noted Branch revenue for the year to 31 March 1951 was £14,590, £14,409 from goods and £181 from passengers. Spending was £25,924, leaving a loss of £11,334, but the branch contributed £62,973 to main-line revenue. The branch wasn't at that time recommended for closure, but the Commission drew attention to loss-making branches.

From the 1970s traffic to Ōpunake was becoming negligible due to competition from road transport. However, the section as far as Kapuni was much better patronized, chiefly due to the New Zealand Lactose factory at Kapuni and the natural gas and urea plant at Palmer Road. For this reason, in April 1976 it was decided to close the line beyond Kapuni (effective 31 July 1976). At the same time the rest of the branch was upgraded and renamed the Kapuni Branch.

The lifting of the railway beyond Kapuni was initially subject to a union ban, and track and buildings remained in place until the early 1980s (similar to what happened with the closure of the Waiau Branch in Canterbury around the same time).

=== Remnants beyond Kapuni ===
Today the former 25 kilometres (16 mi) section from Kapuni to Ōpunake has "plenty of railway remnants to satisfy the enthusiast." Much of the former roadbed is still traceable with embankments and cuttings often repurposed as farm tracks.

For many years there remained a goods shed and loading bay at Pihama and a locomotive shed, gateposts, a platform and goods loading bank at Ōpunake. Most of these have since been removed, but concrete gateposts remain at several road crossings to this day and the former Ōpunake station site remains clearly visible. The former Ōpunake station building has since been relocated to the Taranaki Pioneer Village in Stratford.

== See also ==
- Marton-New Plymouth Line
- Mount Egmont Branch
- Stratford–Okahukura Line
- Waitara Branch
