= Huber Manufacturing Co. =

American traction engine manufacturer

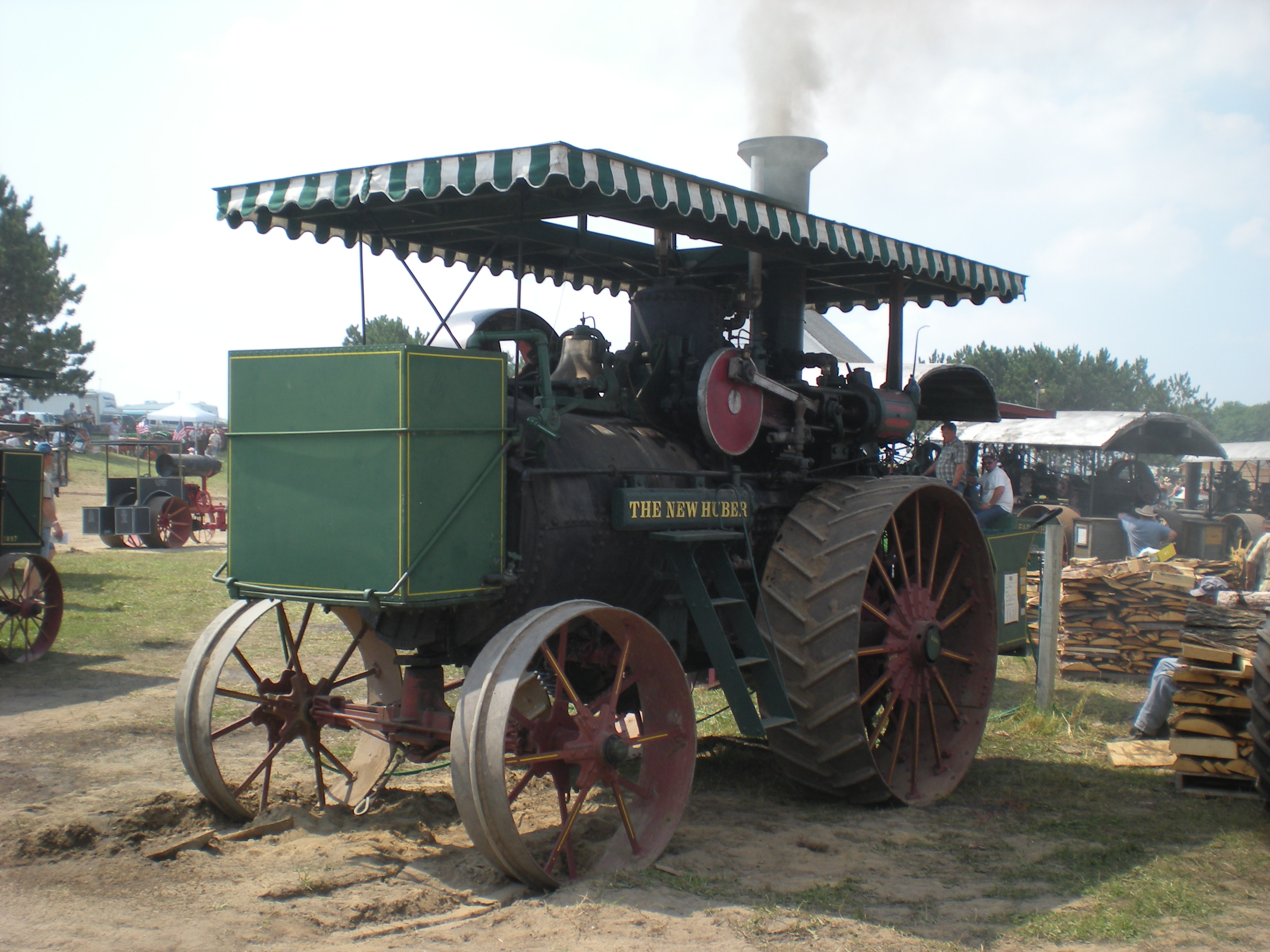
Huber steam tractor

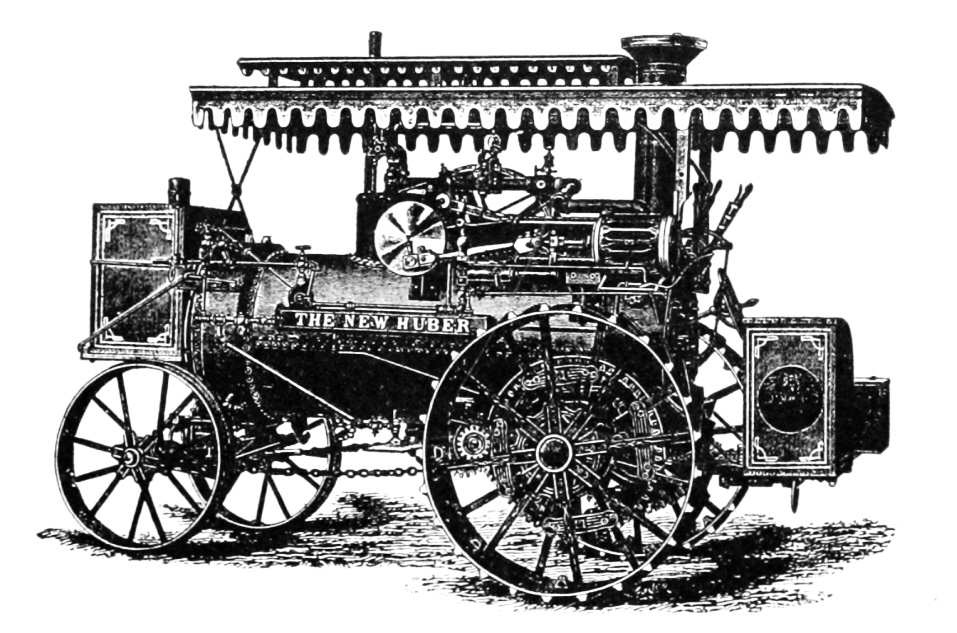
New Huber Steam Tractor

The New Huber Traction engine company of Marion, Ohio, (founded in 1854) built engines from 1885 to 1903.

Edward Huber established his role in the modernization of American agriculture when he invented a “revolving hay rake” (patented in 1863).

Huber was acquired by A-T-O in 1977, and the Huber Division was sold Enterprise Fabricators in 1994, who relocated it to Galion, Ohio. Production ceased after 2002. The Huber intellectual property was acquired by Product Acquisition and Integration Services. Huber Maintainer is now back in production with the introduction of the M-850-E Maintainer in 2021.

== Production figures steam tractors Huber ==
Year	Production figures	Model	Serial number
1875			
1876			
1877			
1878	23		
1879	62		
1880	126		
1881	95		
1882	83		
1883	144		
1884	87		
1885	153		
1886	130		
1887	195		
1888	252		
1889	325		
1890	402		
1891	396		
1892	475		
1893	361		
1894	185		
1895	339		
1896	264		
1897	217		
1898	342		Van Duzen integrated
1899	412		
1900	445		
1901	550		
1902	478		
1903	454		
1904	320		
1905	346		
1906	377		
1907	373		
1908	225		
1909	427		
1910	427		
1911	364		
1912	199		
1913	284		
1914	221		
1915	290		
1916	197		
1917	76		
1918	37		
1919	96		
1920	155		
1921	53		
1922	48		
1923	33		
1924	17		
1925	4		
1926	2		
1927	2		
Sum	11,568		

== Production figures gas tractors Huber ==
Year	Production figures	Model	Serial number
1898	30	Van Duzen	
1911	6 + 2	12-20 Farmer, 30-60	
1912	6 + 43 + 12 + 75	12-20 Farmer, 17-19 Farmer, 13-22 Farmer, 30-60	
1913	150 + 81	15-30, 30-60	
1914	76 ↑	20-40, 30-60	
1915	↑ ↑	20-40, 30-60	
1916	44 ↑ ↑	35-70, 20-40, 30-60, light four	
1917	↑ — -	35-70, light four	
1918		light four	
1919		light four	
1920		light four	
1921		light four	
1922		light four	
1923		light four	
1924		light four	
1925		light four, 18-36 super four	
1926		light four, 18-36 super four	
1927		light four, 18-36 super four	
1928		light four	
1929	~ 1,600 (1916-1929)	light four	
1930			
1931			
1932			
1933			
1934			
1935			
1936		B	
1937		B	
1938		B	
1939		B	
1940		B	
1941		B	
1942		B	
1943		B	
Sum			

== See also ==
- Edward Huber
- Marion Power Shovel
