= Osgood Company =

- Company type: Private
- Industry: Machinery manufacturing
- Founded: 1910
- Founder: Arthur Edgar "A.E." Cheney
- Defunct: 1954
- Fate: Acquired
- Successor: Marion Power Shovel Company
- Headquarters: Marion, Ohio, United States
- Area served: North America, South America
- Products: excavators, draglines

The Osgood Company was a Marion, Ohio based manufacturer of heavy machinery, producing steam shovels, dragline excavators and cranes. What would eventually become Osgood Company was founded in 1910 as Marion Steam Shovel and Dredge Company by A.E. Cheney, the former head of sales for the Marion Steam Shovel Company. Marion Power Shovel acquired Osgood Company in 1954 and integrated Osgood's products into the Marion Power Shovel product line.

== History ==
The company that would provide key intellectual property for what would become Osgood Shovel was established by William Carmichael, nephew of William Otis, the inventor of the steam shovel. Despite having introduced the first drag-line, Carmichael's Albany, New York based company folded in 1899. The assets of Charmichael's failed enterprise remained unused until Cheney and his financial backers acquired the rights to them and moved the machinery to Marion Ohio.

== Establishment ==
Arthur Edgar Cheney, Sales Manager for Marion Steam Shovel, left that company after a disagreement with its CEO, George W. King, over products designed specifically for smaller jobs. King intended to take the company that he co-founded into the lucrative mining industry, while Cheney saw a need for machines that could operate in construction environments. To capitalize on his idea to produce construction machinery, Cheney purchased the assets of the defunct Osgood Manufacturing Company of Albany, New York.

In 1912 Marion Steam Shovel successfully sued Cheney's company for trademark infringement, and the company changed its name from Marion Steam Shovel and Dredge Company to Osgood Shovel Company, later shortened to the Osgood Company.

== Fate ==
Osgood as an independent company ceased to exist in 1954 when it was acquired by Marion Power Shovel Company. Bucyrus International, Inc., purchased Marion Power Shovel in 1997. Bucyrus is being acquired by Caterpillar, Inc. in a transaction completed in the July 2011.
