= Te Roti railway station =

Railway station in Te Roti, Taranaki, New Zealand

Te Roti

General information
- Location: Te Roti Road; Te Roti 4673; New Zealand
- Coordinates: 39°29′09.2″S 174°15′44.8″E
- Elevation: 158 metres (518 ft)
- System: New Zealand Government Railways (NZGR); Regional rail
- Line: Marton–New Plymouth line
- Distance: 144.1 kilometres (89.5 mi) from Marton
- Platforms: Original: Single side Rebuilt: Island platform
- Tracks: 1/2

Construction
- Structure type: at-grade
- Parking: yes

History
- Opened: 18 June 1881; 145 years ago
- Closed: Passenger: 30 October 1967; 59 years ago Freight: 30 October 1967; 59 years ago
- Former names: Te Roti Junction
Location
Notes
- Previous Station: Normanby Station; Next Station: Eltham Station

Te Roti railway station was a rural station on the Marton–New Plymouth line in Taranaki, New Zealand. Opened in 1881, it served the surrounding farming districts. The station's main claim to fame was as the junction station with the Opunake Branch railway line from the 1920s until the 1960s. It closed to all traffic in 1967.

== History ==
The railway line south of Ngaere railway station to Normanby was completed and officially opened on 18 June 1881. According to reports, although the line as far as Te Roti was completed to a good standard, at Te Roti, no station building had yet been built, as the clearing in the bush of the new settlement had only just been made. The track from here to Normanby was also still unballasted. There had been some pressure to open the line as the Mountain Road had been impassable the previous winter.

It wasn't until November 1882 that the contract was issued for the station building to be built, after several complaints from locals about the lack of promised facilities at both Te Roti and Eltham stations. On 22 November, the contract was finally signed, and the new buildings were signed off in February 1883.

=== Facilities ===
Once the buildings had been constructed, Te Roti was set up as a modest country station. It consisted of:

- A standard class 6 shelter shed & platform
- A goods loading bank
- 1 rail loop off the main line, with a second installed in 1892 for the crossing of trains.

By 1904, there was also a 25 ft x 21 ft goods shed and cart approach built.

=== Junction station ===
In 1914, after years of debate, authorisation was granted to construct the Opunake Branch railway line starting at Te Roti. This required the station to be rebuilt, including the construction of a new island station building and signal box and construction of twin tracks north from the station. In 1915, earthworks had begun widening cuttings north of the station as well as shifting the level crossing south of the station further south. There was also calls from the Hāwera Chamber of Commercie to have the northern level crossing at Skeet Road replaced with an overbridge, which was eventually built. By March 1916, the new station building was reported as almost complete. However, it wouldn't be until July 1923 that the new branch railway eventually opened.

The new station featured an island platform with a signal box, positioned between the main line to the east and the branch line to the west. The layout included two loops on the eastern (main line) side—along with a backshunt and a goods shed—and an additional loop on the western (branch line) side. The station was also equipped with interlocked semaphore signals, including both home and distant signals. Two railway houses were also constructed.

== Services ==
=== Passenger services ===
Upon the station's opening, it was served by mixed services. A timetable from 1884 shows two services in each direction each day serving the station. Once the through line to Wellington was completed, the New Plymouth Express service also passed through the station - in 1897 the north and southbound mail trains were reported as crossing at Te Roti station. By 1904 services had increased to 3 southbound and 4 northbound services each day (excluding the Express that would not stop).

When the Opunake Branch opened in 1926, branch trains ran Hawera-Opunake and return. At Te Roti, the service to Opunake would meet the New Plymouth-Wanganui service, allowing passengers from stations north to transfer to the Opunake service. The reverse happened in the early afternoon.

1926 also saw the start of the Taranaki Flyer train. This was a local, passenger-only service that stopped at many stations bypassed by the express, including Te Roti.

By the 1950s, with the lifting of wartime petrol and travel restrictions, passenger traffic began to fall. Branch services became freight-only from 16 October 1955 and two weeks later, the Flyer was replaced with a faster railcar service, but this service was also withdrawn on 7 February 1959. The stop finally closed to passenger traffic on 30 October 1967.

=== Freight services ===
Te Roti functioned as a local freight stop serving the surrounding rural community. When the station first opened, the area was still largely covered in native forest, and early freight likely included timber from sawmills such as Robson's mill at Ketemarae.

As the land was progressively cleared for agriculture, the station's freight focus shifted to inbound farm supplies and outbound dairy-related goods. Notably, Te Roti was never equipped with cattle or sheep yards, which limited the types of consignments it could handle. Instead, traffic centred on general merchandise and seasonal agricultural products. This pattern continued until the station closed to all traffic in 1967, as rising road transport competition rendered many smaller rural stops economically unsustainable.

== Te Roti Junction ==
On 14 May 1961, the Ōpunake Branch was realigned to connect with the main line facing north towards Eltham. This change reflected evolving traffic patterns - most notably the end of coastal shipping services through Patea in 1959 - and also allowed for the closure of the separate engine shed in Hāwera. A new tablet-locked junction, complete with a loop capable of holding 40 wagons and a backshunt of similar length, was established approximately 1.4 kilometres north of the original Te Roti station. This arrangement allowed trains from the south to stop in the loop and the locomotive to swap ends before entering the branch. Trains from the north could run directly onto the branch.

== Decline & closure ==
With this junction moved, Te Roti was downgraded back to a minor rural stop. The original sidings, backshunts, and branch line connections were removed, leaving only the main line and a single loop serving the goods shed. The station building was sold and relocated to private property in Hāwera, and a basic shelter shed was installed in its place on the former island platform. After nearly half a century as a junction, Te Roti returned to the quiet rural role it had started as, a passenger shelter and single goods loop and shed, serving the surrounding district.

This return to a local station was short-lived. Just six years later, in 1967, the station was closed permanently. All remaining buildings and trackwork were subsequently removed.

== Today ==
Six decades on, little remains of what was once a bustling junction. The main line still passes beneath the Skeet Road overbridge, but the former station site is now little more than grass and paddocks. Hidden in the field, the western (branch line) edge of the old island platform still survives, while the eastern (main line) edge was removed following the station's closure. That fragment is all that remains of Te Roti station today.
