= William Otis =

American steam shovel inventor

William Smith Otis
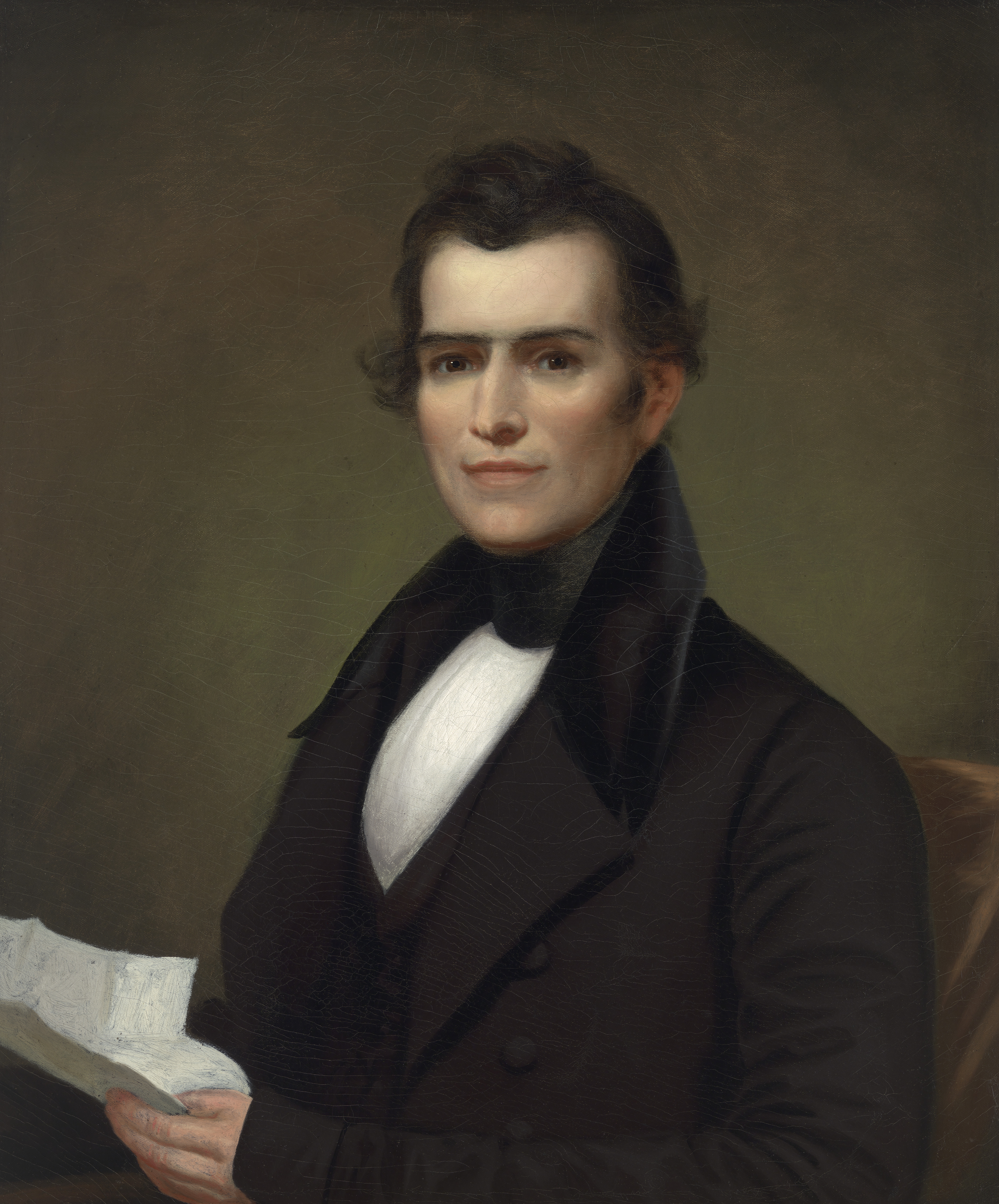
- Portrait by Bass Otis, c. 1835
- Born: September 20, 1813; Pelham, Massachusetts, U.S.
- Died: November 13, 1839 (aged 26)
- Known for: Inventor of the steam shovel
- Relatives: Elisha Otis (Cousin)

William Smith Otis (September 20, 1813 – November 13, 1839) was an American inventor of the steam shovel. Otis received a patent for his creation on February 24, 1839.

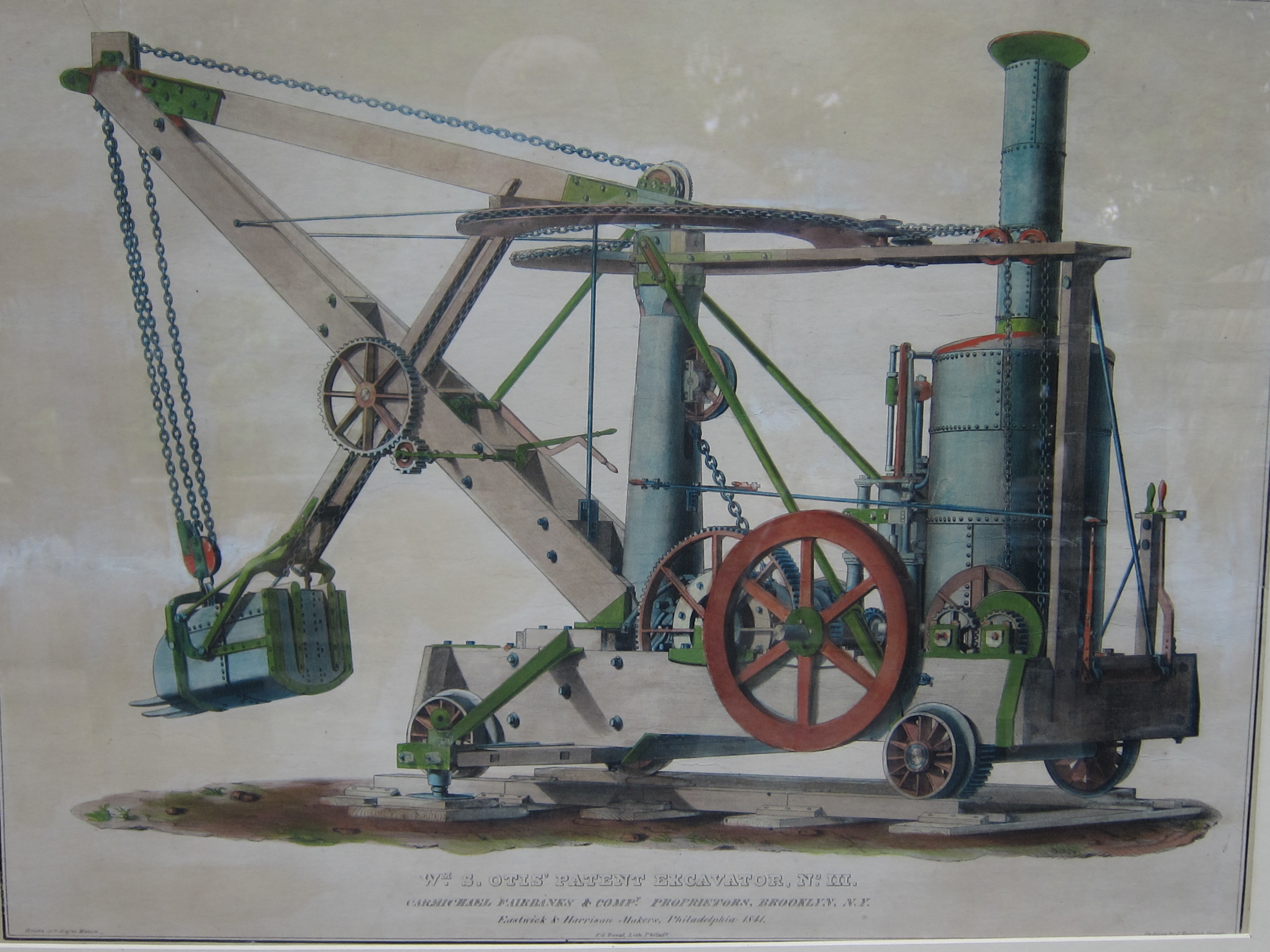
Otis excavator

In 1839 William Smith Otis, civil engineer of Philadelphia, Pennsylvania, was issued a US patent for the steam shovel (No. 1,089) for excavating and removing earth. Officially the patent drawing is missing but a drawing exists which is said to be the one from the patent and this shows the crane mounted on a railroad car. A load of earth could be lifted by the bucket, raised by the crane and turned to be dumped, such as in railcars. The patent described how a steam engine of a type then in ordinary use, was installed with a power control mechanism for the crane, and a system of pulleys to move its arms and bucket. It could move about 380 cubic meters of earth a day, with its 1.1 cubic meter capacity shovel and 180° slewing wooden jib. It was first used on the Western Railroad in Massachusetts.

Otis was born on September 20, 1813, in Pelham, Massachusetts. He was a cousin of Elisha Otis of elevator fame. At an early age, William was interested in earthworks and mechanics. At the age of 22, he had shown an uncommon mechanical ingenuity and created the first steam powered mechanical excavator.

Using materials obtained in vicinity of Canton, Massachusetts, William created the machine in 1835 which was used building railroad lines between Norwich and Worcester. Working with the company, ”Carmichael and Fairbanks”, William Smith Otis devised an apparatus carrying out the same actions as the person with a shovel. Daniel Carmichael was Otis's brother-in-law.

Otis moved to Philadelphia and enlisted the talents of engineer and inventor Joseph Harrison Jr. to help construct a prototype. Harrison operated the company ”Garrett and Eastwick," and fabricated a pre-production model in 1836. On June 15, 1836, William Smith Otis received the patent for the invention; however during a fire, the engineering specifications had been destroyed.

On February 24, 1839, the patent behind number 1089 officially entered validity, and called “Crane-Excavator for Excavating and Removing Earth”.

Otis died of typhoid fever on November 13, 1839, at the age of 26.

== See also ==
- Boston's Back Bay: The Story of America's Greatest Nineteenth-century Landfill, by William A. Newman and Wilfred E. Holton, Northeastern University Press, Boston, published by University Press of New England, 2006. See Chapter 4, Locomotives and Steam Shovels, Pg. 79.
- Marion Steam Shovel
- Osgood Company
