= Waiaua River =

The Waiaua River is the name of two rivers in New Zealand:

- Waiaua River (Bay of Plenty)
- Waiaua River (Taranaki)

== See also ==
- Waiau River (disambiguation)
