= Eltham railway station, New Zealand =

Railway station in Eltham, Taranaki, New Zealand

Eltham
- The stationmaster and staff at the Eltham railway station posing on 11 December 1902.

General information
- Location: 77 Railway Street; Eltham 4322; New Zealand
- Coordinates: 39°25′39.9″S 174°17′40.3″E
- Elevation: 210 metres (690 ft)
- System: New Zealand Government Railways (NZGR); Regional rail
- Line: Marton–New Plymouth line
- Distance: 151.87 kilometres (94.37 mi) from Marton
- Platforms: Single side
- Tracks: 1

Construction
- Structure type: at-grade
- Parking: yes
- Architectural style: Original: Vogel class 3 Replacement: Mid-century

History
- Opened: 7 February 1881; 145 years ago
- Closed: Passenger: 31 May 1976; 50 years ago Freight: 22 September 1986; 40 years ago
Location
Notes
- Previous Station: Te Roti Station; Next Station: Ngaere Station

Eltham railway station is a railway station on the Marton–New Plymouth line, serving the township of Eltham in South Taranaki, New Zealand. Opening in 1881 it was an important hub for both passenger and freight transport. At its height, the station supported a large goods yard, livestock facilities, and regular train services. Although now closed to passengers, the railway line remains active for freight (including the dairy factory), and remnants of the station can still be seen today.

== History ==
Eltham railway station was opened on 7 February 1881, as part of the extension of the Marton–New Plymouth Line south from Ngaere. It served the fledgling settlement of Eltham, which was officially incorporated as a town in 1884. Passenger services were provided from its opening through most of the 20th century. The station also developed into a local freight hub, serving sawmillers, farmers, and later the Eltham Co‑operative Dairy Company. In the late 19th and early 20th centuries, a series of upgrades responded to increased traffic, including applications for tramway rights, larger goods sheds, improved cattle and sheep yards, and new station buildings. Telegraph and telephone services were introduced from the 1890s, and a Post Office operated from the station from 1890 until 1904.

Despite declining passenger use from the 1950s onwards, Eltham continued to operate as a staffed freight station into the 1980s. Even as many smaller stations closed, Eltham was still listed for scheduled train movements as late as June 1988.

== Services ==
=== Passenger ===
In the months after Ngaere station opened in September 1880, there was mounting public pressure to open the line to Eltham as soon as track-laying was completed. The Mountain Road between Hāwera and Stratford was often impassable during winter, causing coach passengers to miss their rail connections — in some cases forcing them to walk between towns.

In response, the railway line as far as Eltham was officially opened on 7 February 1881, with the coach connection transferring to the new station. Initial services included one weekday train (Monday to Friday), two on Saturdays (between Eltham and Inglewood only), and none on Sundays.

In April 1882, authority was requested to build the station building at Eltham, though in October, construction had not yet begun. The station building, when eventually built, was a Vogel Era Class 3 design, featuring a main lobby recessed one foot back from the platform frontage. It was extended in 1891 to include a post and telegraph office (which remained at the station until 1904), and a verandah covering the platform was added in 1898. The final phase of these upgrades came in 1899, when the station yard was fenced, cattle stops installed, the wooden platform frontage replaced with concrete (and extended by 20 feet), and the entire building repainted. The railway reserve was planted out the following year.

Initial services at Eltham were operated as mixed trains, carrying both passengers and freight. These were typically slow and inefficient for travellers, as they required frequent shunting of wagons at intermediate stations. The first dedicated passenger-only service was the New Plymouth Express, introduced in 1886 following the completion of the through-line to Wellington.

This express service operated alongside local mixed trains for decades and was later supplemented by the Taranaki Flyer, a local passenger-only service introduced in 1926. This pattern continued until 1938, when RM class Standard railcars were introduced to provide a faster evening connection between New Plymouth and Wellington. By 1955, Standard railcars (supplemented by 88-seater railcars) had fully replaced traditional passenger trains on the line.

In 1972, the original Eltham station building was replaced as part of New Zealand Railways’ modernisation programme. The railway-office half of Midhirst's recently built 1963 station building was relocated to Eltham following Midhirst's downgrade to an unattended flag station. A private waiting room and reception area and larger station verandah were added during reinstallation to suit Eltham's needs.

Also in 1972, the older Standard railcars were withdrawn and replaced by the Blue Streak daytime service, but mechanical issues soon affected their reliability. All remaining passenger services on the Marton–New Plymouth Line south of Stratford were withdrawn in 1977, ending nearly a century of regular passenger rail at the station. The station building continued to be used for freight and railway administration purposes.

An aerial view of Elthem Railway Station and the neighbouring dairy factory, taken in December 1975.

=== Freight ===
When Eltham station first opened in 1881, it lacked significant freight infrastructure. In 1882 it was pointed out that Te Roti station was to receive accommodation despite Eltham's need being greater. The first formal application for a goods shed was not submitted until August 1888, and it would take several more years before livestock handling facilities were established. Repeated community requests for sheep and cattle yards were made in 1890, 1891, and again in 1895, when the construction of cattle yards was finally approved.

The original goods shed, measuring 46 feet by 32 feet, soon proved inadequate. It was extended to 72 feet in length by 1898, and again to 112 feet by 1903, reflecting the growing volume of freight handled at the station. Additional facilities, such as a crane, were added by 1900 to assist with heavier goods transfers.

In the station's early years, the surrounding district was still heavily forested, and timber was a key commodity. In 1881, Mr Robson applied to construct a tramway along the station siding for timber loading. The following year, sawmillers Southey & Willy applied to lay a tramway across the railway line to connect their mill north of Eltham to the siding. A third tramway proposal came in 1896 from Mr Allison, seeking to cross the railway reserve near the station.

As the surrounding forests were cleared, pasture soon replaced bush, and the region shifted from timber to dairy-based agriculture. The first dairy factory in Eltham was Chew Chong's Jubilee butter factory, which opened in 1887. While not the first factory in Taranaki, it was notable for being the first to purchase milk for cash rather than barter. In 1892, the Eltham Dairy Co-operative was established, further cementing the town's role as a dairy hub. This transition significantly shaped the nature of freight handled at the station, with butter and cheese becoming key outbound commodities in the decades that followed, along with stock to and meat from the neighbouring meat works.

By the 1910s, the station's freight facilities had reached a stable and comprehensive configuration. These included a goods shed, loading bank, cattle and sheep yards, and water supply, supported by extensive track infrastructure: two loops (for 54 and 38 wagons respectively), a backshunt for 11 wagons, and a private siding with a 5-wagon backshunt.

As part of New Zealand Railways’ mid-20th-century modernisation programme, Eltham's original goods shed was replaced in 1968 with a new structure measuring 155 feet by 40 feet. This upgrade reflected the station's continued importance as a freight hub well into the post-war era. However, in the following decades, general goods traffic declined steadily due to the rise of road transport and changes in rural freight logistics.

On 22 September 1986, Eltham station was formally closed to all rail traffic, with the exception of dairy and container traffic for the neighbouring dairy factory. The container transfer (CT) site lost its small ganrty crane and TR class yard shunter in 2019.

Photograph of Eltham Railway Station in 1904, with staff posed on the platform

Eltham Railway Station 14 December 1904, showing the goods shed and carriers from Ōpunake waiting to load.

== Notable Events ==
In May 1896, the station safe at Eltham was blown open during a burglary, with around £100 stolen. Another theft case reached the courts in 1928, when a railway porter was convicted of stealing a single sheet of 3-ply board, valued at eight shillings.

A serious incident occurred in August 1950, when nine goods wagons loaded with cheese and butter escaped the Eltham railway yard during shunting operations. After rolling uncontrolled for 21 minutes, they collided at an estimated 50 miles per hour with a stationary goods train at Hāwera. Although the Hāwera station had been alerted and set the points to direct the runaway wagons into the sidings, the wagons were travelling at such speed that they overran the junction and struck the train.

In 1957, reports emerged of children playing "chicken" with the Wellington–New Plymouth railcar near Eltham, prompting safety concerns.

Eltham station was also the site of two hazardous materials incidents involving gas leaks from railway wagons in the 1970s. In 1975, the entire staff of the neighbouring dairy factory was evacuated while a faulty gas nozzle on a wagon was repaired. A similar event in 1979 led to the evacuation of eight nearby houses.

== Today ==
At the original station site in Eltham, no buildings remain. The area is now grassed over, with a row of large palm trees lining the road beside the railway line — leading to the approximate location of the former platform and station frontage.

Sidings connected to the Fonterra Eltham dairy factory are still in place but are currently out of use.
