= Stratford railway station, New Zealand =

Railway station in Stratford

Stratford
- The Stratford Railway Station and railway yards in 1901.

General information
- Location: 420 Broadway; Stratford 4332; New Zealand
- Coordinates: 39°20′48.1482″S 174°17′17.8224″E
- Elevation: 303 metres (994 ft)
- System: New Zealand Government Railways (NZGR); Regional rail
- Lines: Marton–New Plymouth line, Stratford–Okahukura line
- Distance: 160.73 kilometres (99.87 mi) from Marton
- Platforms: Single side
- Tracks: 1

Construction
- Structure type: at-grade
- Parking: yes
- Architectural style: Mid-century Modern

History
- Opened: 17 December 1879
- Closed: 21 January 1983 (passengers)
- Rebuilt: 12 December 1961
Location
Notes
- Previous Station: Ngaere Station; Next Station (MNPL): Midhirst Station; Next Station (SOL): Toko Station

Stratford Railway Station is a historic railway station in Stratford, a town in the Taranaki region of New Zealand. It serves as a junction on the Marton–New Plymouth Line and Stratford–Okahukura Line (originally called the Toko Branch). Opened in 1879, Stratford station was a key transport hub for over a century, witnessing significant regional development and social events. The station was relocated in the early 1960s to a new site and remained in use for passenger services until 1983. Today, it is no longer served by scheduled passenger trains, but the station building and rail yard survive, and it sees regular freight traffic.

== Original Station ==
=== Establishment and Early Years (1870s–1900) ===
The railway reached Stratford in late 1879 during the construction of the New Plymouth line. The section from Inglewood to Stratford opened on 17 December 1879, marking the beginning of rail service to the nascent township. Three return services were run from New Plymouth on opening day (with return tickets at one-way fares) to allow sightseers to view the newly opened countryside.

Stratford then settled down to daily services, with connections by the Cobb & Co. coach service to destinations further south. At that time, Stratford was a small frontier settlement – the station consisted of a modest Vogel-era Class 4 wooden station building with a passenger platform and basic facilities. The original station was located close to the current Glockenspiel Clock Tower, and its central location led to the town’s post office was relocated into the railway station, with the stationmaster doubling as postmaster.

The line was quickly extended southwards, and by August 1881 the first through train ran from Stratford to Hāwera. By 23 March 1885 the line was linked with the Foxton - Wanganui railway line, completing the railway south.

As traffic grew, the station facilities expanded. A goods shed (approximately 60 x 30 feet) was provided for freight, and by 1901, the platform was extended and the goods shed enlarged to handle increasing volumes. Water tanks were installed to service steam locomotives. There were calls for better passenger amenities; in the late 1890s, local businesses petitioned for the addition of a refreshment room at Stratford to serve train travellers. By 1898 the Railways Department acknowledged the need for refreshment facilities, and applications were made to operate a refreshment stall. These improvements reflected Stratford’s growing importance on the western trunk line.

==== Post Office ====
On 1 July 1880 the Stratford post office was moved into the town's railway station building, operated by the Railways Department staff. Mr T. W. F. Marsden acted as both stationmaster and postmaster. For over 13 years the station doubled as the local post office, handling mail bags on arriving trains and serving telegram and postage needs at the station counter. This arrangement continued until 31 August 1893, when the post office was separated from the railway's control, later moving to a dedicated post and telegraph office.

Aerial image of the original Stratford Railway Station in 1962.

=== Junction and Growth (1900s–1930s) ===
Stratford’s role greatly expanded in the early 20th century with the development of the branch line eastward towards the Taranaki interior. The first section of this line (known as the Toko Branch or Stratford–Whangamomona line) opened to Toko in 1902, and by 1905 the line was extended to Oruru (later Douglas). Over subsequent decades, the branch line was pushed through rugged eastern Taranaki terrain, finally reaching Okahukura (connecting with the North Island Main Trunk) in 1932–33. The completed Stratford–Okahukura Line (SOL) opened a new through-route between Auckland and Taranaki in 1933. Stratford station became the junction of this east–west route with the north–south Marton–New Plymouth Line, cementing its status as a strategic railway crossroads.

During this era, Stratford station saw upgrades to handle increased traffic. An interlocking signalling system was installed by 1907 to improve safety at the busy junction. A signal box was added (or upgraded) – one historical note records a fire in 1911 that nearly engulfed the signal box, illustrating the hazards of early rail operations. The station building was likely expanded or modified to provide additional waiting and luggage rooms (a 1910 approval provided £260 for extra luggage accommodation). By 1913, extra land had been acquired to enlarge the rail yard, and a small locomotive engine shed or servicing facility existed to support branch line engines and shunting locomotives. A "repair shed" is noted in 1913, suggesting facilities for maintenance of rolling stock at Stratford.

Passenger amenities at the old station were still drawing local comment in the late 1940s. In January 1947 the Taranaki Daily News reported a Stratford resident who regularly travelled to the eastern districts remarking that the station had no refreshment room, noting that passengers stopping over late at night or in the early morning could not obtain refreshments, and suggesting that the Chamber of Commerce take the matter up with the Railways Department. A chamber representative, speaking from memory, thought the department had earlier declined to provide refreshment rooms at Stratford because of the short distances to New Plymouth and Hāwera and the presence at the time of a tearoom near the station. In April 1949 the same newspaper reported that a public address system was being installed at the station, with three loudspeakers spaced along the platform and operated from the ticket-selling box. Temporary systems had previously been set up at peak periods such as Christmas and Easter; the new installation was to be permanent.

==== Wig Wag alarms ====
In 1925, it was reported that automatic "wig-wag" crossing signals were to be installed at the busy Fenton Street and Regan Street level crossings due to several accidents and near misses. These were installed at a time when the railways were still experimenting with different crossing warning signals for motorists. These crossings had seen many near misses. These electromechanical signals operated for a quarter century before being deemed obsolete and life expired; on 22 September 1950 they were replaced by modern flashing-light signals (the old wig-wags were removed and not reused).

==== Royal Visits ====
Stratford railway station has hosted two notable royal visits. The first was on 3 March 1927, when Their Royal Highnesses the Duke and Duchess of York (Prince Albert, later King George VI, and Princess Elizabeth, later the Queen Mother) visited Stratford during their New Zealand tour.

Stratford’s welcome was elaborate. A decorated dais was erected just outside the northern end of the station, where the Mayor, J.W. McMillan, read a loyal address to the Duke. The royal train paused while the Duke replied (his remarks were handed in written form to the Mayor). The royal couple then walked along a route lined with schoolchildren – boys holding up arches of greenery – from one end of the platform to the other. The brief stop in Stratford was meticulously organised and left a strong impression: according to reports, Stratford’s reception was "staged in a style quite different from that of New Plymouth" and went off very orderly.

Twenty-seven years later on 8 January 1954, Queen Elizabeth II and Prince Philip, Duke of Edinburgh, arrived at Stratford by the royal train during their post-Coronation Commonwealth tour nzherald.co.nz. They were formally received by the Mayor and local dignitaries on the station platform. Notably, Stationmaster Jack Scott was presented to the Queen – a moment captured in a famous photograph of Her Majesty meeting him on the platform.

The royal party then proceeded in an open car down Broadway (Stratford’s main street) lined with thousands of well-wishers, before re-boarding the train.

The station had been repainted in preparation for the visit. In October 1953 the Railways Department's senior architect, I. M. Clarkson, announced new colour schemes for the Stratford, New Plymouth and Hāwera stations, intended to be brighter than the uniform orange and chocolate brown then common on railway buildings. At Stratford, jasmine yellow was the predominant colour, used for the street-facing walls, the station-side doors and the steelwork. The station-side walls were to be light and dark blue, the street-side doors aircraft grey-green, and the roof, partly asbestos and partly corrugated iron, grey.

=== Plans to Relocate the Station ===
As early as 1910, New Zealand Railways management discussed moving the station to alleviate constraints of the town-centre site. In December 1910, Chief Engineer E. McVilly met with the Stratford Borough Council and Chamber of Commerce to propose shifting the station and realigning the track through Stratford. Two potential sites were mentioned – one near Warwick Road and another between Flint Road and Pembroke Road – both slightly outside the original central location. The southern site (toward Warwick Road) was favoured and plans included lowering the railway line through town and eliminating seven level crossings by building road overbridges and lowering the railway.

In 1924, the issue gained urgency: the Chamber of Commerce learned that Railways Department engineers were actively drawing up plans for a "new station at Stratford" on land toward the southern end of the borough, near Warwick Road. It was revealed that the department had been quietly acquiring (or reserving) land there, and local officials complained that uncertainty over the railway’s intentions was affecting property owners in the area.

Despite these early plans and even preliminary design work in the 1920s, it would be another three decades before work to relocate the station actively got underway, likely due to funding constraints and the onset of the Depression and World War II.

== Replacement Station ==
Aerial view of new Stratford station in 1962

It was not until the 1950s that the long-discussed relocation of Stratford station was finally started. By this time, increasing rail traffic and the need for modern yards prompted NZ Railways to invest in a new site with more room for expansion. A tract of railway land was available a short distance from the old station (about 0.5 miles / 0.8 km away). Construction of the new Stratford station yard began in 1950 with initial earthworks being contracted out.

To accommodate the change, a major realignment was required for the Stratford–Okahukura Line: a 1½-mile (2.4 km) deviation was built to route the SOL into the new yard south of the original line. This deviation was completed and brought into use on 4 May 1959, allowing the former route to be lifted and SOL trains to enter the new yard. Alongside the track realignment, brand new facilities were constructed. A completely new station building was built on the new site, along with a spacious freight yard and a large goods shed. A modern locomotive servicing depot was also established slightly further south of the yard.

The transition from the old station to the new one was phased over several years. By early 1959, new locomotive facilities were already in use, including servicing pits and the installation of a 75-foot turntable (completed by mid-1959) for turning engines. By May 1961, the construction was largely finished: the Railways Department reported the "new station and goods shed [were] completed" as of 14 May 1961. The new Stratford station opened for rail traffic in 1961, initially for freight and operational use, and it was formally opened to passengers later that year. Contemporary records note that the new station building was opened on 12 December 1961.

The old station building and structures were removed or repurposed around this time; tenders were called in late 1960 to sell and remove the redundant signal boxes from the old yard. By June 1963, the last elements of the project fell into place when the new goods shed was fully opened for service, allowing the old goods shed and yard to be retired.

=== Station Building ===
The new Stratford station of 1961 was constructed in a mid-century modern style, typical of NZR’s post-war rebuilding programme. Similar architectural forms were used in Taranaki at stations such as New Plymouth, Hāwera, and Pātea. It was a single-storey structure, featuring steel and timber framing and timber and brick-veneer, with a long canopy facing the platform (typical of NZR’s 1960s station designs, functional but with clean lines). The station had adjacent parking and road access improved over the old site, as well as space on the road frontage for Road Service buses.

== Services & Operations ==
=== Passenger Services ===
For much of its history, Stratford was a calling point for passenger trains running between New Plymouth and Wellington. The New Plymouth Express – introduced in 1886 – was the premier passenger train on this route, providing a direct connection from New Plymouth through Stratford to Wellington. This was supplemented by railcar services from 1938 (which replaced the express fully on 31 July 1955), which continued on this service until 30 July 1977, with road transport taking over inter-city travel.

When the Stratford–Okahukura line opened in 1933, Stratford gained a second long-distance route, northwards through Taumarunui to Auckland. The inauguration of this line saw the launch of the New Plymouth Night Express, an overnight train connecting Taranaki with Auckland. The service typically ran three nights a week. The last true Night Express ran in 1956, after which the service was replaced with daily railcar services. These were later adjusted to a daytime service running to Taumarunui and became a regular passenger train in 1978, continuing until its final cancellation in 1983.

These were supplemented by mixed services, with the last of these running in 1975.

Since 1983 rail activity in Stratford has been freight-oriented, with only occasional heritage excursion trains carrying passengers through the station.
