= Waiau River =

Waiau River is the name of several rivers in New Zealand:

- Waiau River (Coromandel) in the Thames-Coromandel District
- Waiau River (Gisborne)
- Waiau River (Hawke's Bay)
- Waiau River (Southland)
- Waiau Uwha River, Canterbury, formerly called the Waiau River
- Waiho River, West Coast region, traditionally the Waiau River

== See also ==
- Waiaua River (disambiguation)
