= Thew Shovel =

Shovel and crane industry from Lorain, Ohio

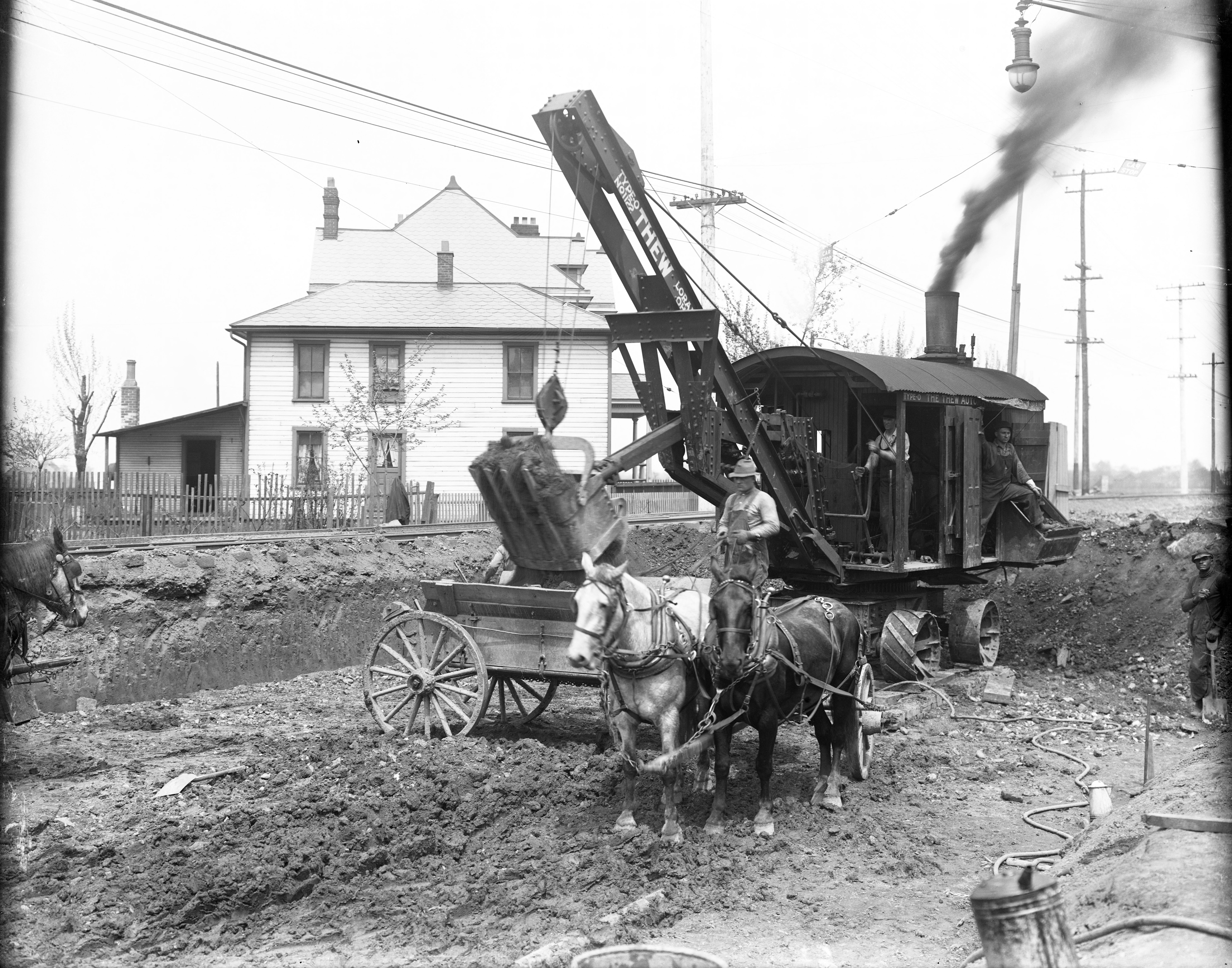
Columbus Railway, Power & Light Company (CRP&L) photograph of a Thew Type-O steam shovel

The Thew Automatic Shovel Company was a power shovel and crane manufacturing company established by Captain Richard Thew in Lorain, Ohio in 1899.

Captain Thew invented the first fully revolving steam shovel in the United States. The idea for this type of shovel came to Thew while he was captain of an ore-carrying vessel on the Great Lakes as a solution to the challenge of moving iron ore once it was deposited on the docks. The machines at the time tasked with moving this iron ore on the docks were "railroad-type" steam shovels with booms that had limited range of motion and therefore were not able to adequately reach all of the iron ore. Manual labor was required to hand shovel the iron and complete the project.

Thew worked with H.H. Harris, a shovel designer, to create a machine with a 360° range of slewing motion. The first prototype was constructed at the Variety Iron Works (Cleveland, Ohio) in 1895. The machine's design and scope was finalized. As orders increased for the machine, the Thew Automatic Shovel Company was established in 1899 in Lorain.

Thew Shovel continued to innovate the field of earthmoving machinery. In 1912 they were producing electric shovels which alleviated the pollution from steam shovels, and around 1914 were using gasoline powered shovels. The Lorain TL Series was a type of construction equipment produced in 1945 that offered a completely welded superstructure fabrication. They also received a patent in 1952 for a type of "shear ball" bearing slew ring.

== Company history ==
The company expanded their line of earth moving shovels and cranes, and in 1924 were renamed the Lorain Shovel Company.

To support the war effort during World War II, the company advocated for owners of construction equipment, including their own Thew machines, to pledge support for machinery owners. Thew produced product manuals to teach mechanics how to repair Thew equipment and to encourage everyone to share knowledge to prevent construction or shipping delays. Thew Shovel received an Army-Navy "E" Award for their production contributions to the war effort during WWII.

The company entered into United States government contracts in 1951 for power shovels and cranes. In 1956 Thew Shovel acquired the Dixie Crane Shovel Company, the Byers Machine Company, and (majority interest purchase of) the Artisan Metal Works Company. In 1957, the main offices and plants were located in Lorain, and the Parts Division and bronze factory were operated out of Elyria, Ohio. Many of the original automatic shovels built by Thew, despite being outdated technology in the 1950s, continued to be operated because they were reliable pieces of equipment.

Thew Shovel held an international division. In 1962, the company reached an agreement with the Tamashima plant of Uraga-Tamashima Diesel Kogyo K.K. in Tokyo for the Japanese company to manufacture Thew products, including shovels, cranes, and Moto-Loaders.

In 1964, they became the Thew-Lorain Division of Koehring Co. after declining sales. In 1987 they were bought out by the Terex Corporation.

== Leadership ==
F.A. Smythe was the first person to hold the position of president of the Thew Shovel Co., and he maintained that title for 46 years. for 46 years. After his passing, he was succeeded by his son, C.B. Smythe, in 1945.
