= Steam shovel =

Steam-powered excavation machine

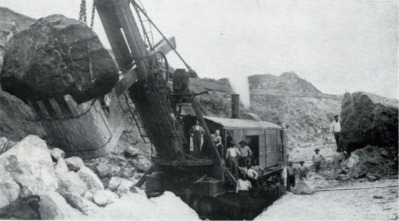
A Marion Power Shovel Company steam shovel excavating the Panama Canal in 1908.

A steam shovel is a large steam-powered excavating machine designed for lifting and moving material such as rock and soil. It is the earliest type of power shovel or excavator. Steam shovels played a major role in public works in the 19th and early 20th century, being key to the construction of railroads and the Panama Canal. The development of simpler, cheaper diesel, gasoline and electric shovels caused steam shovels to fall out of favor in the 1930s.

== History ==
=== Origins and development ===
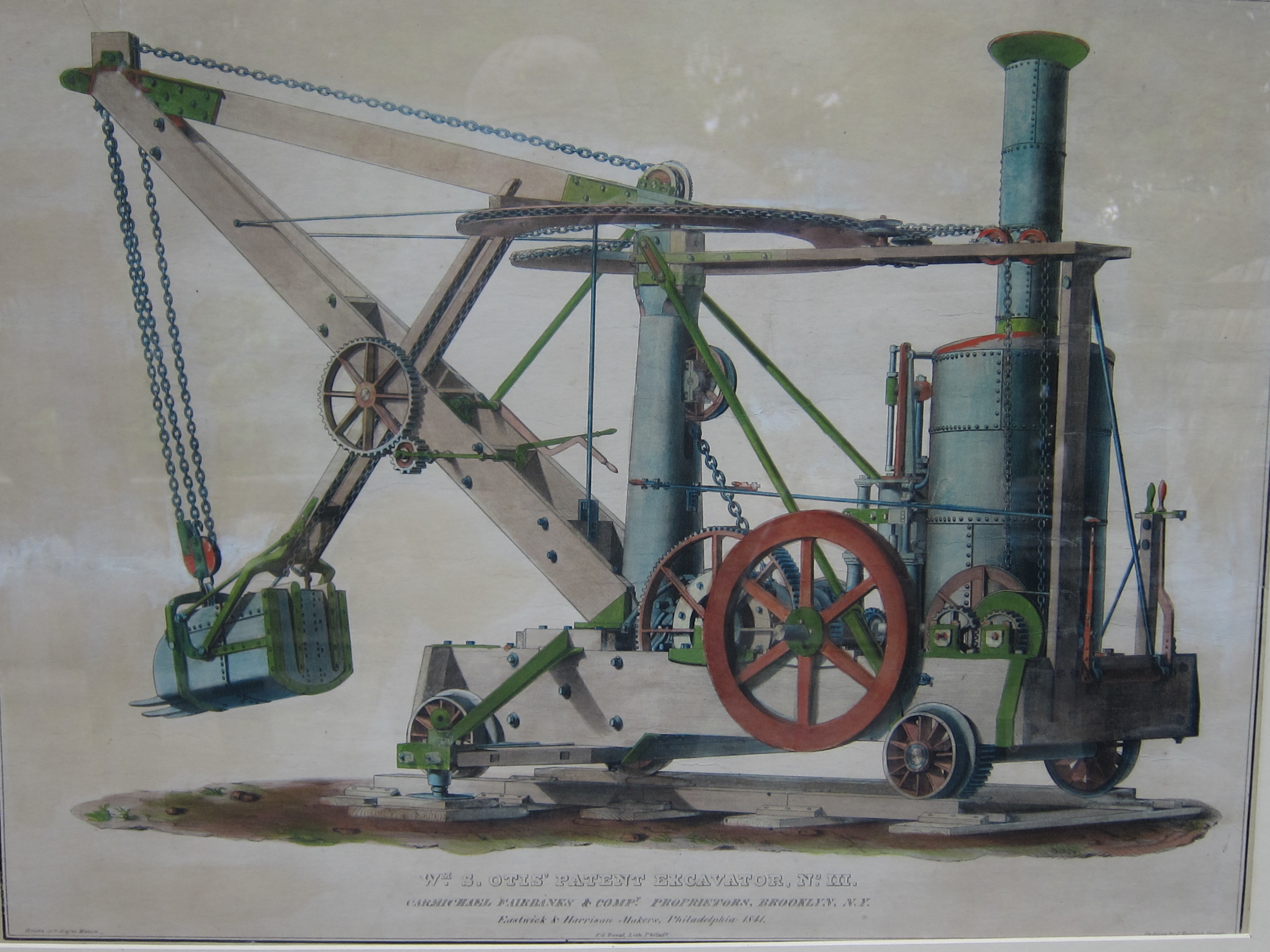
Otis excavator. 1841

Grimshaw of Boulton & Watt devised the first steam-powered excavator in 1796. In 1833 William Brunton patented another steam-powered excavator which he provided further details on in 1836. The steam shovel was invented by William Otis, who received a patent for his design in 1839. His cousin, Oliver Smith Chapman, continued developing the machine after Otis's death. He obtained the patent and repurchased interests that had been sold by Mr. Otis and obtained more patents. The first machines were known as 'partial-swing', since the boom could not rotate through 360 degrees. They were built on a railway chassis, on which the boiler and movement engines were mounted. The shovel arm and driving engines were mounted at one end of the chassis, which accounts for the limited swing. Bogies with flanged wheels were fitted, and power was taken to the wheels by a chain drive to the axles. Temporary rail tracks were laid by workers where the shovel was expected to work, and repositioned as required.

Steam shovels became more popular in the latter half of the nineteenth century. Originally configured with chain hoists, the advent of steel cable in the 1870s allowed for easier rigging to the winches.

Later machines were supplied with caterpillar tracks, obviating the need for rails.

The full-swing, 360° revolving shovel was developed in England in 1884, and became the preferred format for these machines.

=== Growth and uses ===
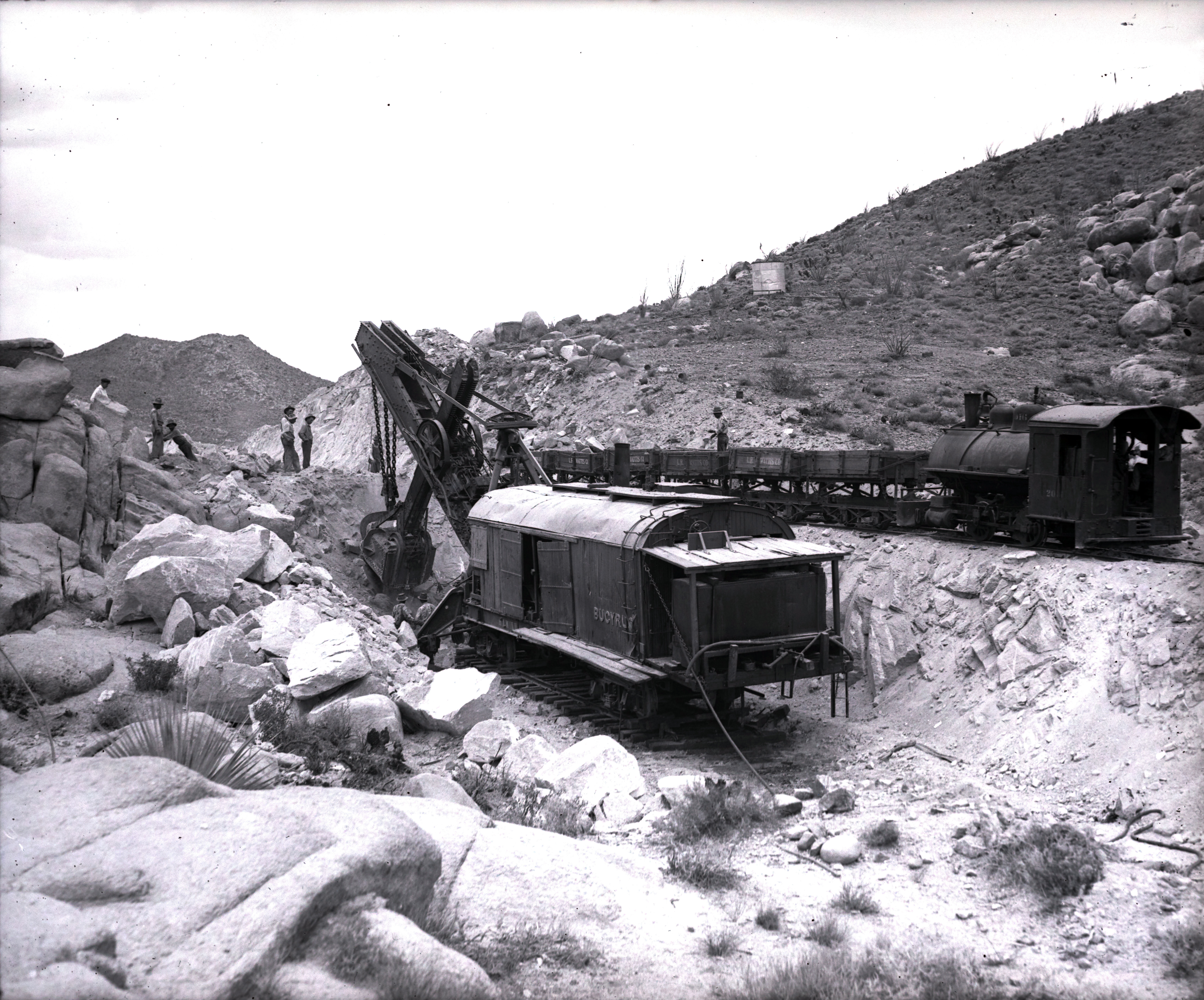
A steam shovel excavating for the San Diego and Arizona Railway line, circa 1919.

Expanding railway networks (in the US and the UK) fostered a demand for steam shovels. The extensive mileage of railways, and corresponding volume of material to be moved, forced the technological leap. As a result, steam shovels became commonplace.

American manufacturers included the Marion Steam Shovel Company founded in 1884, the Bucyrus Company and the Erie Shovel Company, now owned by Caterpillar.

The booming cities in North America used shovels to dig foundations and basements for the early skyscrapers.

One hundred and two steam shovels worked in the decade-long dig of the Panama Canal across the Isthmus of Panama. Of these, seventy-seven were built by Bucyrus; the remainder were Marion shovels. These machines 'moved mountains' in their labors. The shovel crews would race to see who could move the most dirt.

Steam shovels assisted mining operations: the iron mines of Minnesota, the copper mines of Chile and Montana, placer mines of the Klondike – all had earth-moving equipment. With the burgeoning open-pit mines – first in Bingham Canyon, Utah – shovels became prominent. The shovels removed hillsides. As a result, steam shovels were used globally from Australia to Russia to coal mines in China. Shovels were used for construction, road and quarry work.

Steam shovels became widely used in the 1920s in the road-building programs in North America. Thousands of miles of State Highways were built in this era, together with factories and many docks, ports, buildings, and grain elevators.

=== Successors ===
During the 1930s steam shovels were supplanted by simpler, cheaper diesel-powered excavating shovels that were the forerunners of those in use today. Open-pit mines were electrified at this time. Only after the Second World War, with the advent of robust high-pressure hydraulic hoses, did the more versatile hydraulic excavators take pre-eminence over the cable-hoisting winch shovels.

Many steam shovels remained at work on the railways of developing nations until diesel engines supplanted them. Most have since been scrapped.

Large, multi-ton mining shovels still use the cable-lift shovel arrangement. In the 1950s and 1960s, Marion Shovel built massive stripping shovels for coal operations in the Eastern US. Shovels of note were the Marion 360, the Marion 5900, and the largest shovel ever built, Marion 6360 The Captain – with a 180-cubic-yard (140 m^{3}) bucket – while Bucyrus constructed one of the most famous monsters: the Big Brutus, the largest still in existence. The GEM of Egypt (GEM standing for "Giant Excavating Machine" and Egypt referring to the Egypt Valley in Belmont County, eastern Ohio where it was first employed), which operated from 1967 to 1988, was of comparable size. It has since been dismantled. Although these big machines are still called steam shovels, they are more correctly known as power shovels since they use electricity to power their winches.

== Operation ==
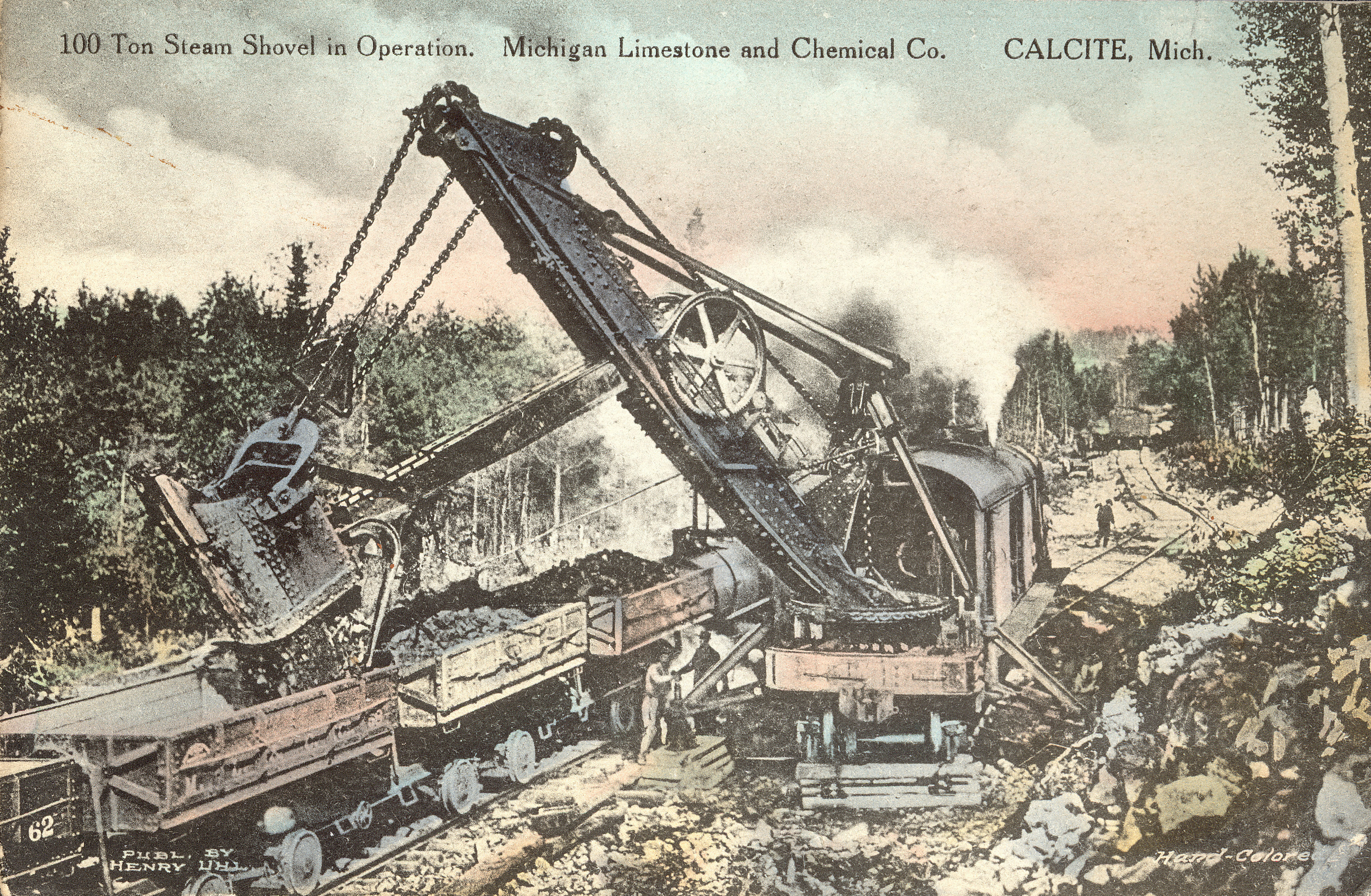
100-ton steam shovel mounted on railroad tracks, cc. 1919

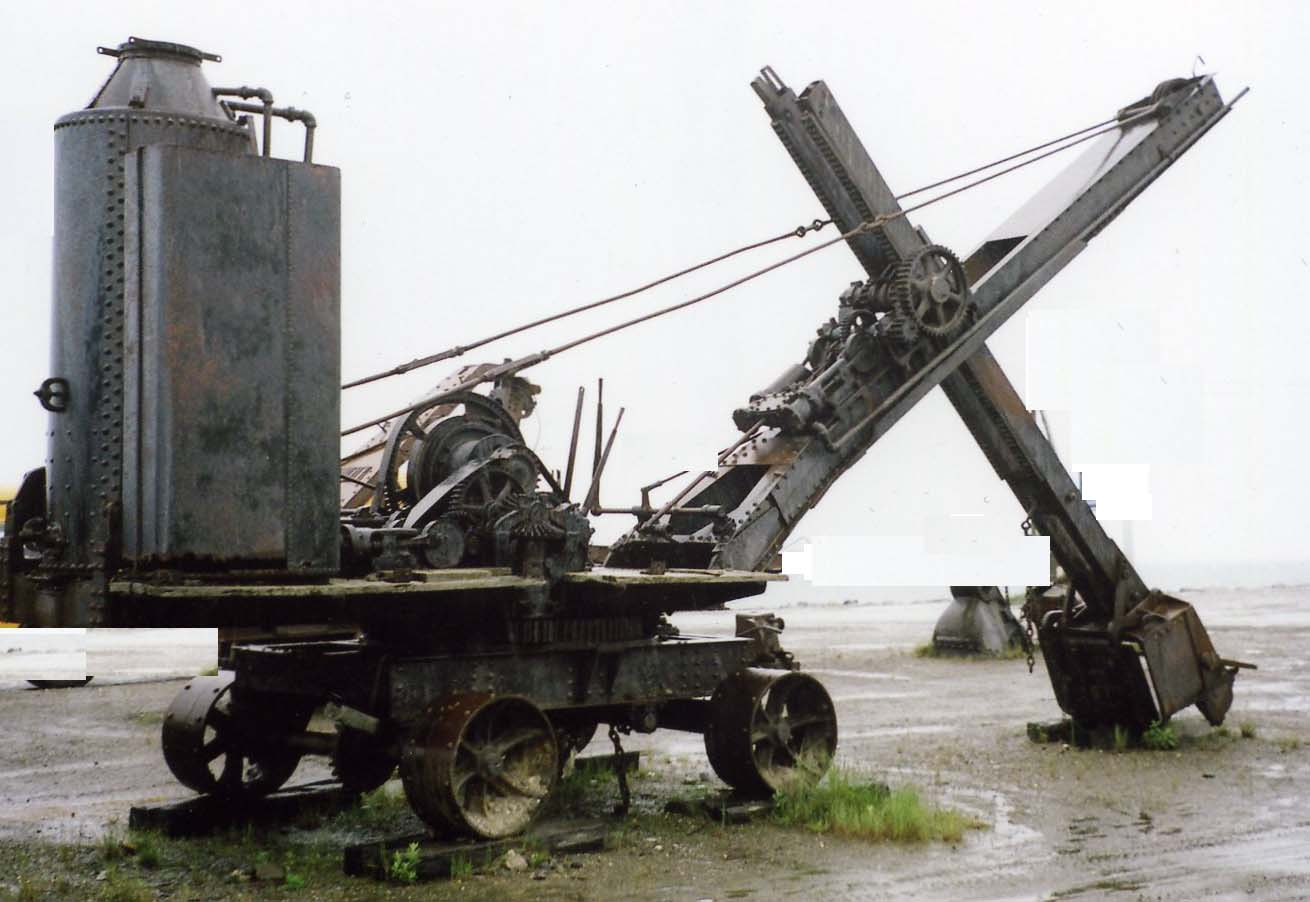
A derelict steam shovel in Alaska; major components visible include the steam boiler, water tank, winch, main engine, boom, dipper stick, crowd engine, wheels, and excavator bucket.

A steam shovel consists of:

- a bucket, usually with a toothed edge, to dig into the earth
- a "dipper" or "dipper stick" connecting the bucket to the boom
- a "boom" mounted on the rotating platform, supporting the dipper and its control wires
- a boiler
- a water tank and coal bunker
- steam engines and winches
- operator's controls
- a platform on which everything is mounted
- wheels (or sometimes caterpillar tracks or railroad wheels)
- a house (on the platform) to contain and protect 'the works'

The shovel has several individual operations: it can raise or luff the boom, extend the dipper stick with the boom or crowd engine, and raise or lower the dipper stick. Some shovels can rotate the platform on which the bulk of the machine is mounted on a turntable above its truck, similar to a modern excavator, while others, particularly those with longer bodies, have a turntable at the base of the boom, and rotate the boom.

When digging at a rock face, the operator simultaneously raises and extends the dipper stick to fill the bucket with material. When the bucket is full, the shovel is rotated to load a railway car or motor truck. The locking pin on the bucket flap is released and the load drops away. The operator lowers the dipper stick, the bucket mouth self-closes, the pin relocks automatically and the process repeats.

Steam shovels usually had at least a three-man crew: engineer, fireman and ground man. There was much jockeying to do to move shovels: rails and timber blocks to move; cables and block purchases to attach; chains and slings to rig; and so on. On soft ground, shovels used timber mats to help steady and level the ground. The early models were not self-propelled, rather they would use the boom to manoeuvre themselves.

== Steam shovel manufacturers ==
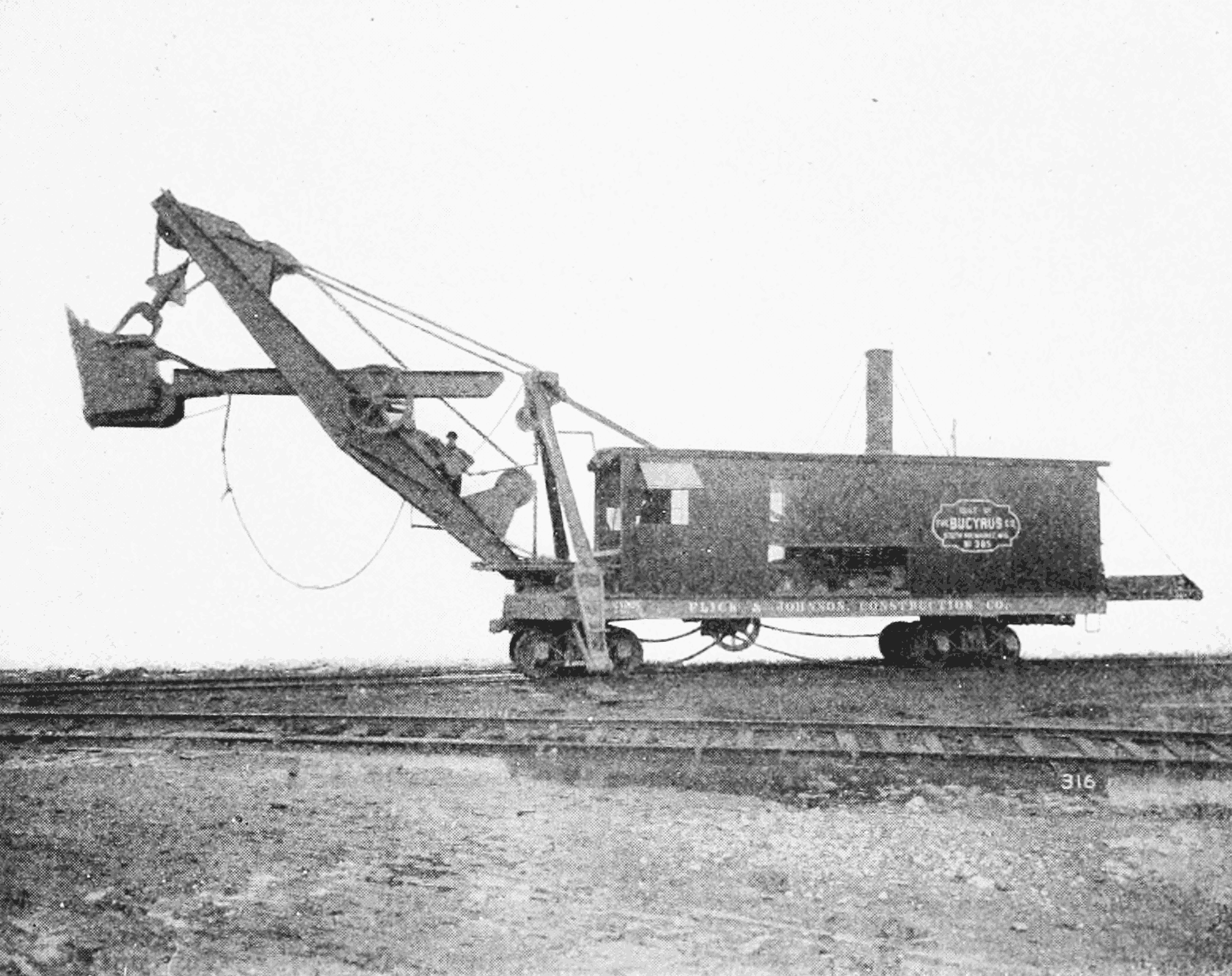
A railroad shovel by Bucyrus; the boom rotates independently of the cab housing

North American manufacturers:

- Ball Engine Co.
- Bucyrus
- Erie
- Marion Steam Shovel Dredge Company
- Moore Speedcrane (later Manitowoc Cranes)
- Northwest Shovels
- Thew Automatic Shovel Co.
- Vulcan Iron Works

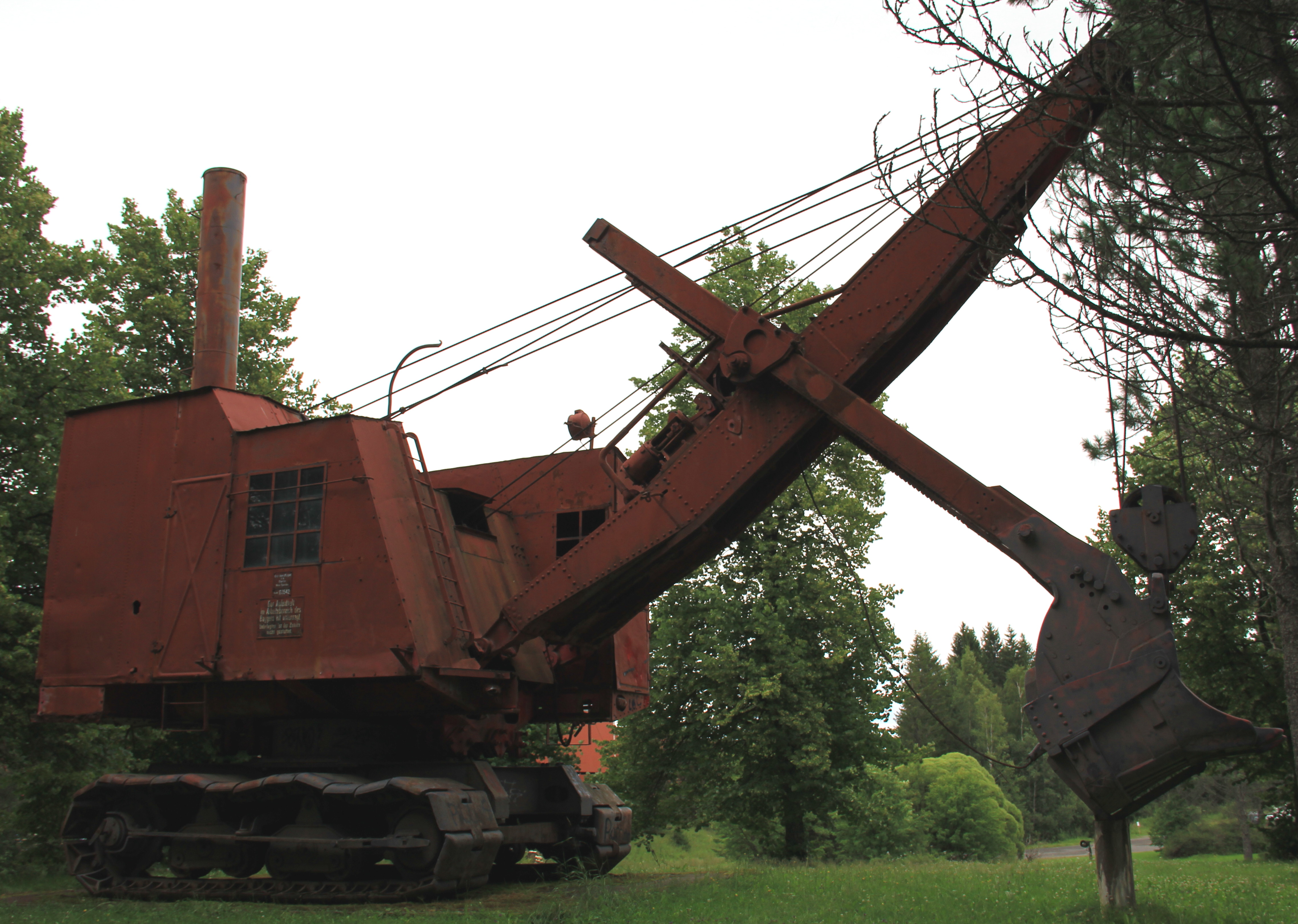
O&K steam shovel in Kitee, Finland

European manufacturers:

- Demag (Germany)
- Fiorentini (Italy)
- Lubecker
- Menck
- Newton & Chambers (UK)
- Orenstein and Koppel GmbH (Germany)
- Ruston & Hornsby (UK)

=== Power shovel/dragline manufacturers ===
- Bucyrus International
- Insley Manufacturing Co.
- Komatsu
- Lima Locomotive Works
- Link Belt
- Marion Power Shovel
- P&H Mining Equipment
- Priestman Bros (UK)
- Ransomes & Rapier (UK)
- Ruston-Bucyrus (UK)

== Preservation ==
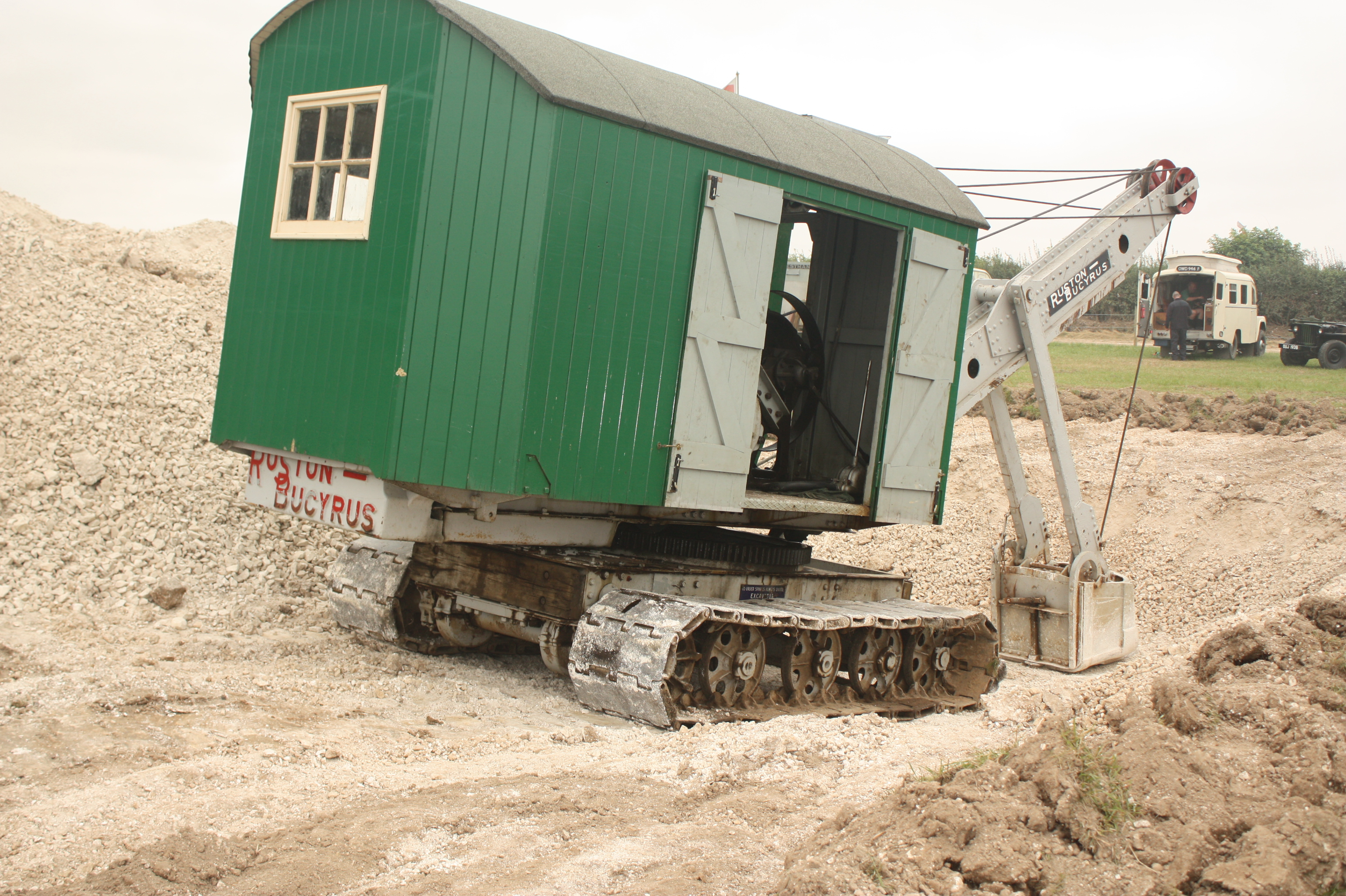
Ruston-Bucyrus No. 4 (built 1931)

Most steam shovels have been scrapped, although a few reside in industrial museums and private collections.

=== The Le Roy Marion ===
The world's largest intact steam shovel is a Marion machine, dating from either 1906 or 1911, located in Le Roy, New York. It was listed on the National Register of Historic Places in 2008.

=== Ruston Proctor Steam Navvy No 306 ===
Dating from 1909, this machine – Ruston's called it a 'crane navvy' – is the oldest surviving steam navvy in the world. It was originally used at a chalk pit at Arlesey, in Bedfordshire, England. After the pit was closed, the steam navvy was simply abandoned and 'lost' as the pit became flooded with water. By the mid-1970s, the area had become a local beauty spot, known as The Blue Lagoon (from chemicals from the quarry colouring the water), and after long periods of drought, the top of the rusty navvy could be seen protruding from the water. Ruston & Hornsby expert Ray Hooley heard of its existence, and organised the difficult task of rescuing it from the water-filled pit. Hooley arranged for its complete restoration to working order by apprentices at the Ruston-Bucyrus works. Subsequently it passed into the care of the Museum of Lincolnshire Life. The museum was unable to make full use of the machine, and, not being stored under cover, its condition deteriorated. In 2011, Ray Hooley donated the machine to the Vintage Excavator Trust at Threlkeld Quarry and Mining Museum in Cumbria. It was moved to the quarry in 2011, and (as of 2013) full restoration is once again under way.

=== 1923 Bucyrus Model 50-B ===
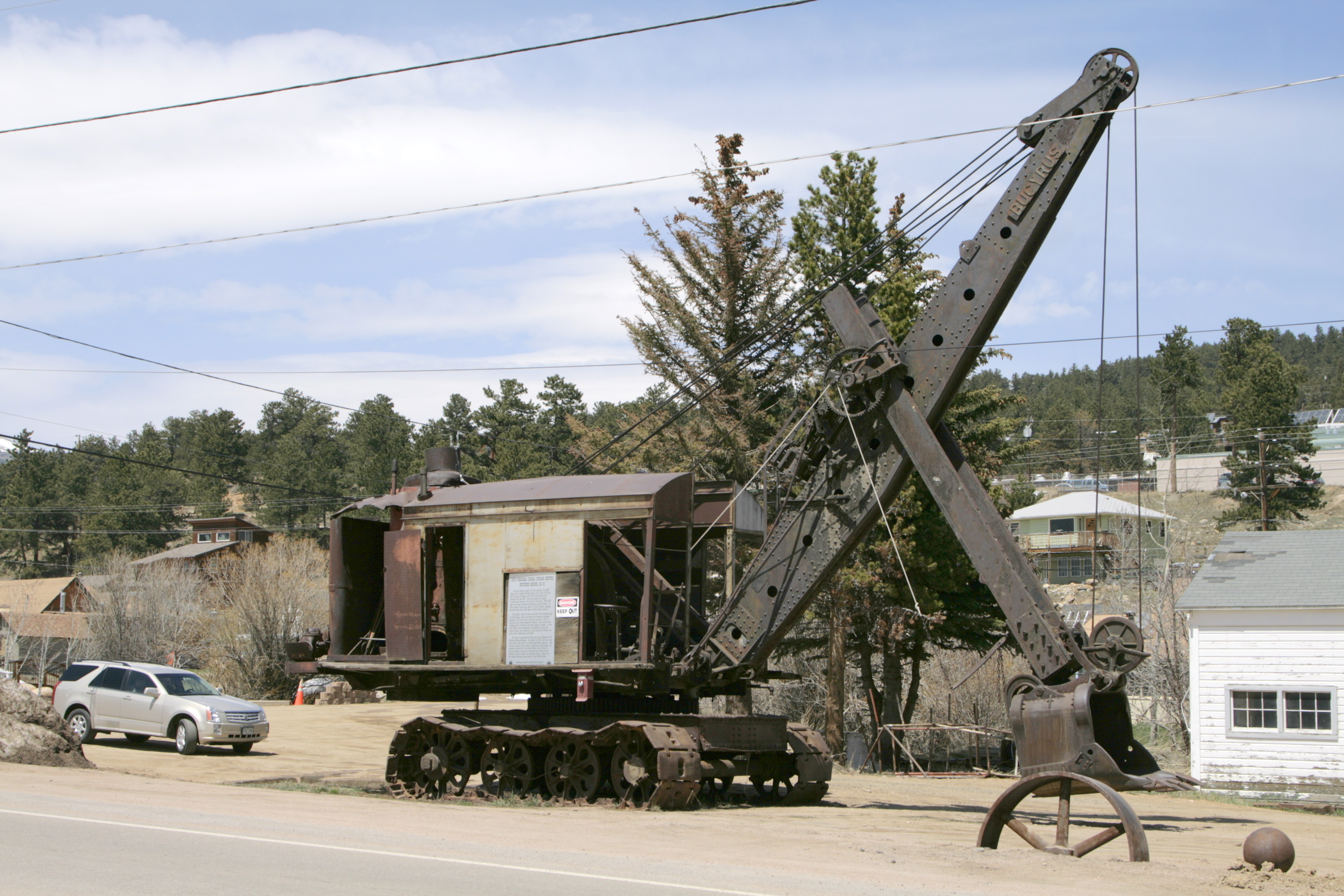
1923 Bucyrus Model 50-B at the Nederland Mining Museum

Twenty-five Bucyrus Model 50-B steam shovels were sent to the Panama Canal to build bridges, roads, and drains and remove the huge quantities of soil and rock cut from the canal bed. All the shovels but one were scrapped at Panama. The survivor was shipped back to California and then brought to Denver. In the early 1950s, it was transported to Rollinsville by Roy and Russell Durand, who operated it at the Lump Gulch Placer, six miles south of Nederland, Colorado, until 1978. This steam shovel is one of two (the other at the Western Minnesota Steam Thresher's Reunion in Rollag, MN) remaining operational Bucyrus Model 50-Bs, and is preserved at the Nederland Mining Museum. Roots of Motive Power in Willits, CA has also acquired a 50-B and operates it for the public once a year at their Steam Festival in early September.

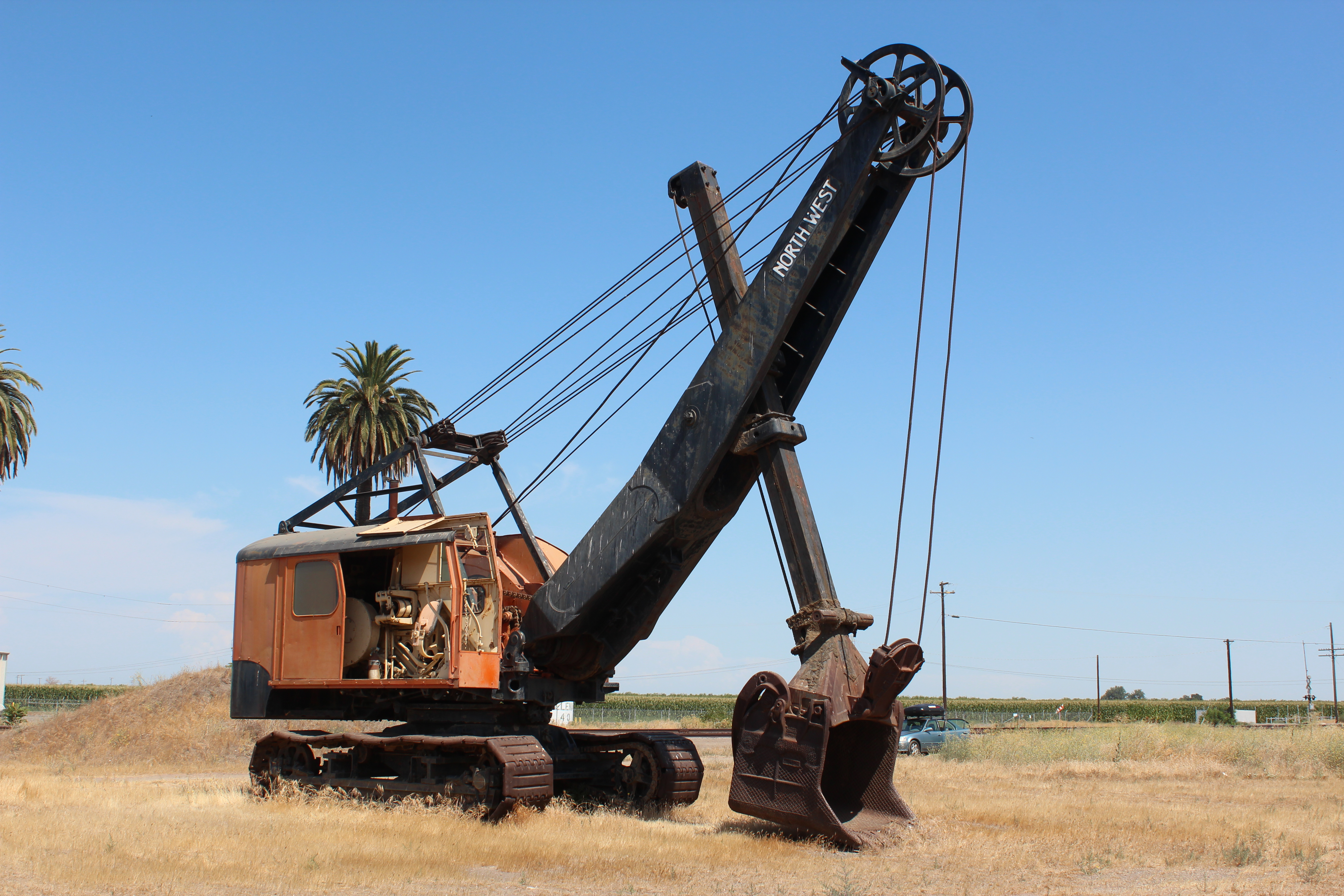
This is one of two steam shovels sitting abandoned off I 5 in Zamora, CA, north of Sacramento. The sign on the back identifies it as having been manufactured by Northwest, and spraypainted on the top back of the cab is the name Carl J Woods. More Information

=== Northwest Model ===
Two shovels sit abandoned in Zamora, California, north of Sacramento beside I 5.

== In fiction ==
- The classic children's book Mike Mulligan and His Steam Shovel features a steam shovel as a main character.
- A steam shovel, clearly illustrated with a boiler and smoke rings, also known as a "Snort", features towards the climax of the children's book Are You My Mother? by P. D. Eastman. The little bird is returned to its nest by the steam shovel.
- In the Thomas & Friends TV series, a steam shovel named Ned appears as a minor character. A rail-mounted steam shovel named Marion also appears in Thomas & Friends, beginning with the movie Tale of the Brave.
- In the Australian children's TV series Mr. Squiggle, Bill the Steam Shovel provides comic relief and produces steam from his "nose" when he laughs.
- In the Clive Cussler novel The Saboteurs, steam shovels play a key part of the storyline in the sabotage of the building of the Panama Canal.
- In Lackadaisy, Rocky turns one into a makeshift Siege Engine by setting Sandbags on the control levers, then climbing into the bucket with a sack of Dynamite.
- In the 1932 Laurel and Hardy film Their First Mistake, whilst on the telephone to Ollie, Stan mentions that he has two tickets for the 'Cement Worker's Bazaar' and if they attend they may win a steam shovel.

== See also ==
- Excavator
- Steam crane
- Crane (railroad)
- Dredge
