= Midhirst railway station =

Railway station in Midhirst

Midhirst
- Midhirst, including the railway station and goods yards. 22 August 1958.

General information
- Location: Mountain Road; Midhirst 4394; New Zealand
- Coordinates: 39°17′27.4878″S 174°15′55.5048″E
- Elevation: 342 metres (1,122 ft)
- System: New Zealand Government Railways (NZGR); Regional rail
- Line: Marton–New Plymouth line
- Distance: 167.7 kilometres (104.2 mi) from Marton
- Platforms: Single side
- Tracks: 1

Construction
- Structure type: at-grade
- Architectural style: Vogel Class-5 (original); Mid-century Modern (replacement)

History
- Opened: 17 December 1879
- Closed: 28 February 1982 (passengers); 22 September 1986 (freight)
- Rebuilt: 18 January 1963 (new station building)
Location
Notes
- Previous Station: Stratford Station; Next Station : Waipuku Station

Midhirst Railway Station was a rural railway station in the Taranaki region of New Zealand, serving the small township of Midhirst about 5 km north of Stratford. It was part of the Marton–New Plymouth Line and operated from its opening in 1879 until closure in 1986.

The station was a typical small stop on the railway, handling both passengers and freight (especially farm produce and livestock) and even doubling as the local post office for much of its history. It played an important role in the development of the surrounding dairy-farming community over the late 19th and early 20th centuries.

== History ==
Midhirst station opened on 17 December 1879, during the extension of the railway from New Plymouth towards central Taranaki. As a small wayside station, Midhirst was equipped with a modest Vogel-era Class 5 station building and basic facilities. By the 1890s it had a simple weatherboard station office, a short passenger platform, and a goods shed of about 30 × 20 ft for freight. A passing loop was provided to allow trains to cross on the single line, initially holding about 22 wagons.

Over the years the yard was gradually expanded: by 1906 the loop could fit 32 wagons and the station had gained a cart-loading bank, fixed signals, and even a stationmaster's house on site. Stock yards were added to load sheep and cattle, reflecting the area's farming economy. In 1928 the Railways approved extending the goods shed with a 25-foot roofed addition to cope with traffic.

The Midhirst Co-operative Dairy Company factory was a key local industry, and in 1921 plans were made to build a new, modern butter factory at Midhirst with a railway siding to dispatch its produce directly from the factory to the station. (The Midhirst Dairy Company was notable for producing top-grade butter in this era.) Despite these improvements, some amenities remained basic; as late as 1921 residents were complaining that Midhirst station still had no seating and was lit only by kerosene lamps, lacking the better lighting seen in other stations.

Through the early 20th century, Midhirst remained a fully staffed station. A Stationmaster was in charge (the community had lobbied in the 1890s for a resident Stationmaster to also handle postal business), and from 1901 the station handled telegraph and postal services in addition to railway duties (see Other Facilities below). The railway line through Midhirst became busier in the 1920s–1930s as train traffic grew, and the infrastructure was upgraded accordingly.

In late 1938 a road overbridge was constructed at Midhirst to eliminate the dangerous level crossing on the main highway by the station, improving safety on what is now State Highway 3. Shortly after, in 1939, the Railways Department announced a major expansion of Midhirst's crossing loop and sidings. The main loop at that time could hold only 34 four-wheeled wagons, limiting the length of trains that could pass; plans were made to extend its capacity to 100 wagons, and to lengthen the siding serving the goods shed and stockyards from a 28-wagon capacity to 56 wagons. These extensions, completed around 1940, enabled the station to better handle the heavier K-class locomotives and longer freight trains, thereby improving service for both passengers and goods in the district.

In 1959, a railcar running the evening service from Auckland crashed into a car just north of the station. The accident occurred at about 11.33 p.m. when a car left the road, crashed through a wire mesh safety fence, knocked several posts over, rolled down an embankment, and came to rest on its wheels in the centre of the railway track. The driver ran to the station, but just as he arrived, there was a loud crash as the rail-car ploughed into the car. There were no injuries but the railcar was significantly damaged.

== Other Facilities ==
=== Post Office ===
Besides its railway role, Midhirst station also functioned as a post office and telegraph facility for much of its existence. The settlement's first postal service pre-dated the railway – a postal receiving office was operating in a local store by 1879. In 1892 and again in 1893 the Post Office urged the railways to take over postal work as well, but it would be another decade before this occurred.

On 6 January 1901, the New Zealand Railways Department formally opened a Post Office at Midhirst station to be run by the station staff. Having the stationmaster and railway clerks also serve as postmasters was a common practice in country areas, and it meant one building could provide both mail and telegraph services and train tickets. This arrangement lasted for 44 years until 7 October 1945, when the post office was separated and a non-classified postmistress was employed directly by the post office.

In the early 1960s, the station building required replacement. The new station building opened in 1963, which again included a post office at the southern end of the building. The post office outlasted the railway office, with its end of the building remaining on the platform until 1976. At this point, a new phone exchange was opened, and the postal business was relocated to the local store.

== Renewal, Decline & Closure ==
By the mid-20th century, the importance of Midhirst station began to wane. Improved roads and trucking competition led to declining rural rail passenger numbers and freight volumes, and the original 19th-century station structure, which had served for over 80 years, required replacement.

In January 1963, a modern replacement building, 80 feet long and 14 feet wide, was opened just north of the old station building. The new building was built with railway offices on the Northern end of the building, the Post Office in the Southern end, and a general lobby in between for both bus and train passengers. However, on 29 August 1972, the station was reduced to an unattended flag station. The railway's end of the building was removed and sent to Eltham as a replacement station there, leaving the post office end of the building on the platform until it was closed in 1976.

Regular passenger trains through Midhirst were progressively reduced. The first to go were the mixed services in the mid-1970s, followed by the cancellation of the Blue Streak railcar service to Wellington on Friday, 30 July 1977. The station eventually closed to all passenger traffic on 28 February 1982, eleven months before the final passenger service between New Plymouth and Taumaranui ended on 21 January 1983.

Freight traffic too had fallen off, with most local dairy and livestock consignments shifting to road transport by the 1980s. The station's goods sheds and yards saw little use, and New Zealand Railways decided to close the site entirely. Midhirst station was closed to all traffic on 22 September 1986, ending over a century of service. The remaining sidings were removed or disconnected soon after, leaving only the mainline track passing through the location.

== Today ==
Today, there is no active station at Midhirst. The railway line still runs through the township, carrying occasional freight trains, but no passenger stops or freight facilities remain on site. A single siding remains, although overgrown and cut off from the main line, and a small concrete block bus shelter stands where the station building once stood.

One half of Midhirst's 1960s station building has been preserved in Waitara, where it has been re-erected on Memorial Place next to the War Memorial Hall for community use. Aside from that, little is left of Midhirst's railway station. The platform and yard have been removed, and the area has reverted to open land adjacent to the still-operational railway line. While trains no longer halt at this small Taranaki settlement, the story of Midhirst Railway Station remains an important chapter in the region's transport and community history.
