= Ngaere railway station =

Railway station in Ngaere, Taranaki, New Zealand

Ngaere
- Ngaere Railway Station as seen in 1918, with the scene of a motor accident in the foreground.

General information
- Location: Mountain Road; Ngaere; New Zealand
- Coordinates: 39°23′23.7″S 174°17′57.5″E
- Elevation: 253 metres (830 ft)
- System: New Zealand Government Railways (NZGR); Regional rail
- Line: Marton–New Plymouth line
- Distance: 157.37 kilometres (97.79 mi) from Marton
- Platforms: Single side
- Tracks: 1

Construction
- Structure type: at-grade
- Parking: yes
- Architectural style: Vogel-era Class 5 (1880 building)

History
- Opened: 27 September 1880; 146 years ago
- Closed: Passenger: 24 January 1966; 60 years ago Freight: 21 December 1964; 61 years ago
- Former names: Ngaire (until 1 May 1909)
Location
Notes
- Previous Station: Eltham Station; Next Station: Stratford Station

Ngaere railway station (Ngaire until 1909) was a rural station on the Marton–New Plymouth line in Taranaki, New Zealand. Opened in 1880, it served the surrounding dairy district and the nearby settlement of Ngaere. The station played a small but enduring role in both local freight traffic and early passenger traffic, particularly as the gateway to the renowned Ngaere Gardens. It closed to goods traffic in 1964 and to passenger services in 1966.

== History ==
Construction of the railway south of Stratford railway station began even before Stratford station opened in 1879. The railway and station complex at Ngaire was completed and opened to the public on 27 September 1880. The station's role as the terminus did not last long, with the railway opening to Eltham station on 7 February 1881 and officially opening right through to Hāwera on the 20 October 1881.

=== Facilities ===
The station was a modest but well-equipped Vogel-era station. It consisted of:

- A standard class 5 station building, platform & men's urinal building (Mountain Road side of tracks)
- A 30 ft x 30 ft Goods shed & loading bank
- Cart approach to the platform

There were also 3 loops off the main line (holding 28, 22 and 14 wagons respectively), a 5 wagon backshunt and approval for a butter loading bank.

In 1893, there was consideration given to relocating the station building to Waitara to replace their station that had burnt down. This did not proceed, and the building remained until 1957 when tenders were called for the building's removal. It was replaced with a small shelter-shed.

== Services ==
=== Passenger Services ===
Upon the station's opening in 1880, the morning passenger service from New Plymouth was met by a coach, which transported passengers to Waitotara station, where the train from Wanganui would meet them. In the afternoon, the situation reversed, with the train for New Plymouth departing at 5:20 pm and arriving in New Plymouth at 7:51 pm. The coach connection wasn't guaranteed, though, and the roads south of Ngaere were often boggy and impassable to wheeled traffic. The train north was also often delayed by late-running services running south, much to the annoyance of passengers. Some coach connections continued at Ngaere even after the line to Eltham opened, continuing until the terminus moved to Hawera.

Services at Ngaere were mostly mixed services from the time the station opened. The New Plymouth Express did not stop at the station. However, the 1926 Taranaki Flyer passenger train service, which was more focused on local traffic, did stop at Ngaere.

From the 1910s to the 1930s, holiday trains would run bringing people to Ngaere Gardens, located near the station. The gardens, known for their exotic trees, manicured lawns, and boating facilities, would receive trains from Stratford, Hāwera and New Plymouth, leading to a boost in passenger numbers at the station.

Aerial photograph of Ngaere railway station in April 1962

=== Freight Services ===
Ngaere handled a variety of agricultural and industrial freight, and at various times had private sidings for the New Plymouth Sash & Door Company, Duncan Brothers, A. Brown & Co. and James Robson, who held a siding licence from 1884 onward. Robson's siding was modified several times and even became the site of a reported railway wagon fire in 1897.

In 1914, the nearby Ngaere Dairy Factory opened and also sent products (including their "Triumph" brand cheese) from the station.

== Incidents ==
The line around Ngaere witnessed several incidents during the station's lifetime.

On 6 September 1922, several goods wagons on the 7.50 am mixed service from New Plymouth came off the line just north of Ngaere station. Fortunately, the two passenger cars remained on the line, saving the 30 passengers (mostly women and children) from serious injury. The line reopened the next day, though sightseers and souvenir hunters made their presence known the whole time, including attempting to take pieces of the broken wagons or even the carcass of an entire pig.

Another accident occurred at Finnerty Road, directly north of the station, when a horse and cart that was returning from delivering milk cans to the nearby dairy factory was struck by the southbound New Plymouth Express. The carter, a Mr C.H. Taylor, jumped clear at the last moment, but the horse was killed instantly and the cart destroyed.

In July 1964, another goods train derailed, with 16 wagons coming off the line and destroying 2 chain of track.

== Decline & Closure ==
With the rise of road transport and the consolidation of freight operations, Ngaere's role declined in the mid-20th century. The station building was removed in 1957 and replaced with a simple shelter shed. Goods services ended on 21 December 1964, and passenger services on 24 January 1966. Following closure, Ngaere's station building was removed, the sidings were lifted, and the site reverted to farmland.
