= Edward Huber =

American inventor and industrialist

- Born: September 1, 1837; Dover, Indiana
- Died: August 26, 1904 (aged 66); Marion, Ohio

Edward Huber (September 1, 1837, Dover, Indiana – August 26, 1904, Marion, Ohio) was an American inventor and industrialist.

Huber established his role in the modernization of American agriculture when he invented a “revolving hay rake” (patented in 1863) that allowed one man to do in three hours what three men could do in a day. Relocating to Marion, Ohio, Huber patented his hay rake and began a full line of agricultural implements. Huber's production lines ran only in second to that of Cyrus McCormick, the inventor of the McCormick reaper. Huber also began to build and market affordable steam tractors, and was the first producer of modern gasoline-powered tractors.

Eventually, Huber entered the heavy construction equipment market by pioneering the use of weighted rollers on his steam engines meeting the needs of modern road leveling and grading.

This company was eventually combine with Bucyrus-based WARCO Industries to form the Huber-WARCO Corporation of America. Huber-Warco was ultimately taken over by Dresser Industries, which closed the production facilities in Marion. Huber, a division of Enterprise Fabrications, Inc., then operated in Iberia, Ohio until 2009 when they were closed after a hostile take over by Louisiana Crane Company. The Huber brand appears to be being dissolved by Louisiana Crane Company.

Edward Huber is also known for providing seed capital to Henry Barnhart, who was seeking to build a better steam shovel in the 19th century. Once capitalized and incorporated in 1884, Marion Steam Shovel (later Marion Power Shovel) became the leading producer of shovels and draglines in the United States until cheaper, foreign made products forced the closure of Marion Power Shovel in the 1980s. Nevertheless, Marion Steam Shovel's contributions can not be overlooked and include their use almost exclusively in digging the Panama Canal, and NASA's launch creepers that helped move the Apollo Rockets into launch position.

Edward Huber died, aged 66, and was interred in St. Mary's Catholic Cemetery, Marion, Ohio.
