= Waiaua River (Taranaki) =

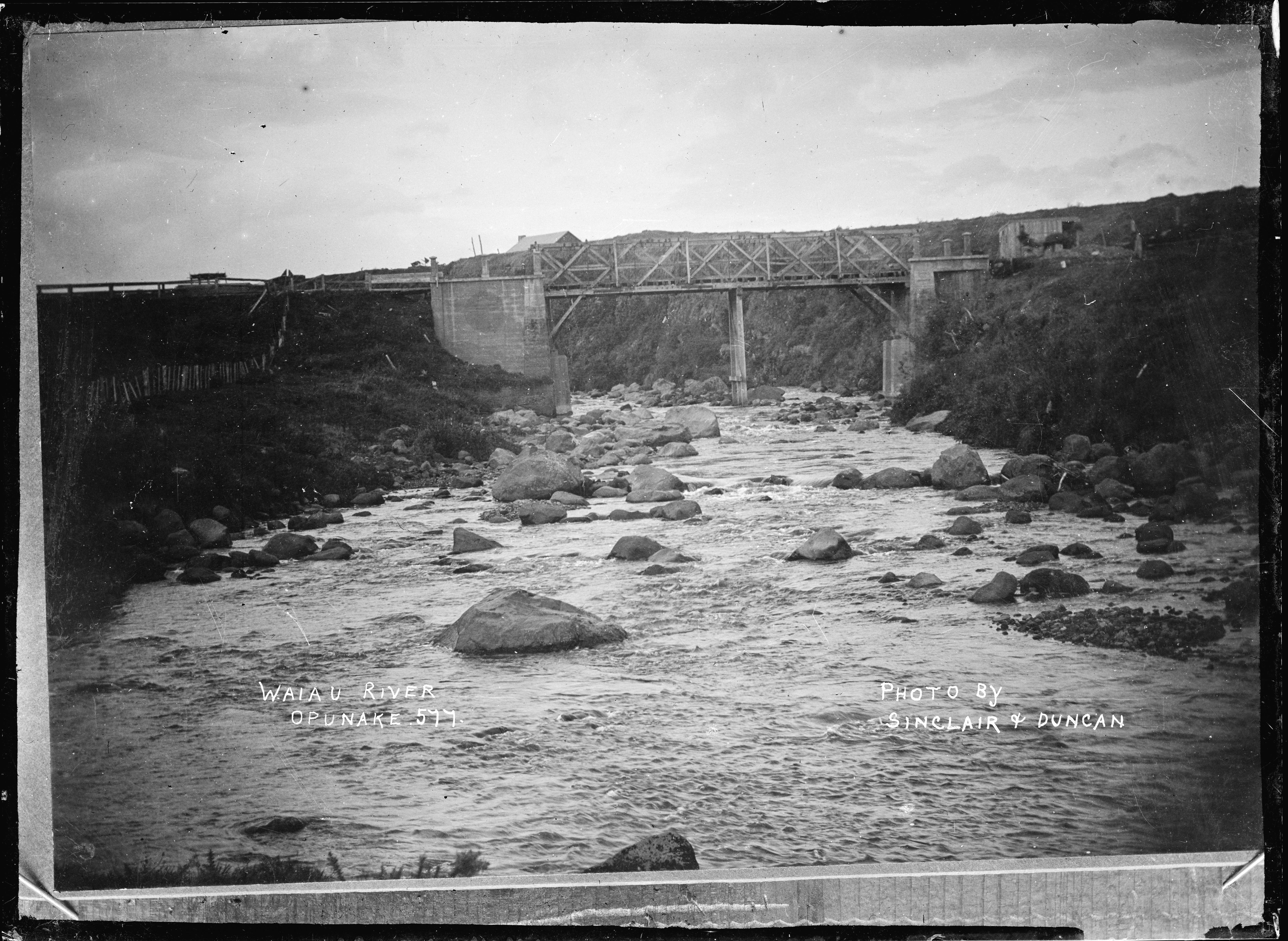
- Bridge over the Waiaua River south-east of Ōpunake (circa 1910s).
- Route of the Waiaua River
- Mouth of the Waiaua River Waiaua River (Taranaki) (North Island)

Location
- Country: New Zealand

Physical characteristics
- Source
  - location: Mount Taranaki
  - coordinates: 39°18′13″S 174°03′05″E
- Mouth
  - location: South Taranaki Bight
  - coordinates: 39°27′46″S 173°51′42″E
  - elevation: 0 m (0 ft)
- Length: 25 km (16 mi)

Basin features
- Progression: Waiaua River → South Taranaki Bight → Tasman Sea
- Tributaries
  - left: Waiaua Fork Stream

The Waiaua River is a river of the Taranaki Region of New Zealand's North Island. It flows southwest from the slopes of Mount Taranaki to reach the Tasman Sea at Ōpunake.

The New Zealand Ministry for Culture and Heritage gives a translation of "waters containing herring" for Waiaua. Aua is usually translated as yellow-eye mullet.

== See also ==
- List of rivers of New Zealand
