= Marion Power Shovel Company =

American construction and mining equipment firm

- Industry: Machinery manufacturing
- Founded: Marion, Ohio, United States August 1884; 141 years ago
- Founder: Henry Barnhart; Edward Huber; George W. King
- Defunct: 23 July 1997; 28 years ago
- Fate: Acquired
- Successor: Bucyrus International, Inc.
- Headquarters: Marion, Ohio, United States
- Area served: Worldwide
- Products: 5760 Electric Shovel; 6360 Electric Shovel; 7820 Electric Dragline; 8200 Electric Dragline; 8750 Electric Dragline; 191M Electric Shovel; 201M Electric Shovel; 301M Electric Shovel; 351M Electric Shovel; 305M Crawler Dragline

Marion Power Shovel Company was an American firm that designed, manufactured and sold steam shovels, power shovels, blast hole drills, excavators, and dragline excavators for use in the construction and mining industries. The company was a major supplier of steam shovels for the construction of the Panama Canal. The company also built the two crawler-transporters used by NASA for transporting the Saturn V rocket and later the Space Shuttle to their launch pads. The company's shovels played a major role in excavation for Hoover Dam, the Holland Tunnel and the extension of the Number 7 subway line to Main Street in Flushing, Queens.

Founded in Marion, Ohio in August, 1884 by Henry Barnhart, Edward Huber and George W. King as the Marion Steam Shovel Company, the company grew through sales and acquisitions throughout the 20th century. The company changed its name to Marion Power Shovel Company in 1946 to reflect the industry's change from steam power to diesel power.

The company ceased to be independent when it was sold, becoming the Marion division of Dresser Industries in 1977. In 1992, Dresser spun off the Marion division and certain other assets into a holding company that eventually became the Global Industrial Technologies, Inc. Global sold the division to longtime rival Bucyrus International for US$40.1 million in 1997. Bucyrus integrated the Marion division's products into the Bucyrus product line, then closed the Marion, Ohio, facility. In 2010 Bucyrus was purchased by Caterpillar, Inc., the world’s largest equipment manufacturer.

== History ==
=== Marion Steam Shovel Company ===
The Marion Steam Shovel Company was established by Henry Barnhart, George W. King and Edward Huber in August 1884. While steam shovels had been made prior to this date in the United States, Barnhart persuaded Huber to financially back his design, which incorporated a stronger bucket support than other makes. Barnhart and Huber patented Barnhart's changes under US Patent No. 285,100 on September 18, 1883. One element of Barnhart's design was the use of solid iron rods (hog rings) to support the boom of the shovel, which was stronger than simple chain.

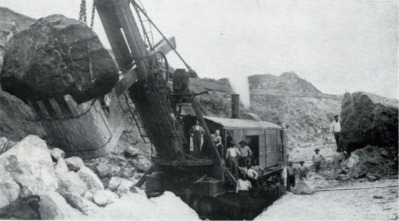
Marion Model 91, Culebra Cut, Panama Canal

Marion built large and small steam shovels for building contractors, railroads and the US Army Corps of Engineers who were building the Panama Canal at the time. The company, from between 1902 and 1911, shipped 24 shovels to Panama for the construction of the canal. One set the record in July 1908 for moving 53,000 cubic yards (41,000 m^{3}) of earth in 25 eight-hour days after American project management began.

By 1911 90% of all large bucket steam shovels and draglines were produced in Marion Ohio, which was also the headquarters of Osgood Steam Shovel, Fairbanks Steam Shovel and General Excavating Corporation. (Future head-to-head competitor Bucyrus Steam Shovel was founded 15 miles (24 km) from Marion in nearby Bucyrus, Ohio, and relocated to Milwaukee, Wisconsin, in 1893 after Bucyrus city officials refused to approve expansion plans for the company.)

Marion 111-M Dragline (built in 1948, in operation at the Harrison Coal & Reclamation Historic Park in New Athens, Ohio, in 2011) (30 seconds)

Towards the end of WWI the company assembled M1918 railway guns utilizing a repurposed M1895 12 inch 45 caliber coastal defense gun. The only remaining example was stored for testing purposes at Naval Surface Warfare Center Dahlgren VA until 2011 when it was moved to Fort Lee, VA for inclusion in the U.S. Army Ordnance Training and Heritage Center.

Marion excavators were used during construction of Magnitogorsk Iron and Steel Works in the Soviet Union in 1930s. Marion was the first fоreign machine there, in 1930. Poet Boris Ruchyov wrote the "Ballad of Excavator Marion" [Баллада об экскаваторе Марион] on this occasion.

=== Marion Power Shovel ===
In April 1946, the company changed its name to the Marion Power Shovel Company to more closely reflect its products.

Marion built its first walking dragline in 1939 and became a key player in providing giant stripping shovels to the coal industry, being the first to put a long-boom revolving stripping shovel to work in North America in 1911. Marion’s succession of giant shovels, many breaking world size records, starting with The Mountaineer in 1956 which was 16 stories. One shovel load moved approximately 90 tons, which was then one of the world's largest power shovels. Marion's huge power shovel models eventually culminated in the world’s largest: the 1965 Marion 6360. The 6360 at the Captain Mine, Illinois, operated with a 180 cubic yard (138 cubic meter) dipper. With an estimated weight of 15,000 tons (13,600 tonnes), this machine is one of the heaviest mobile land machines ever built.

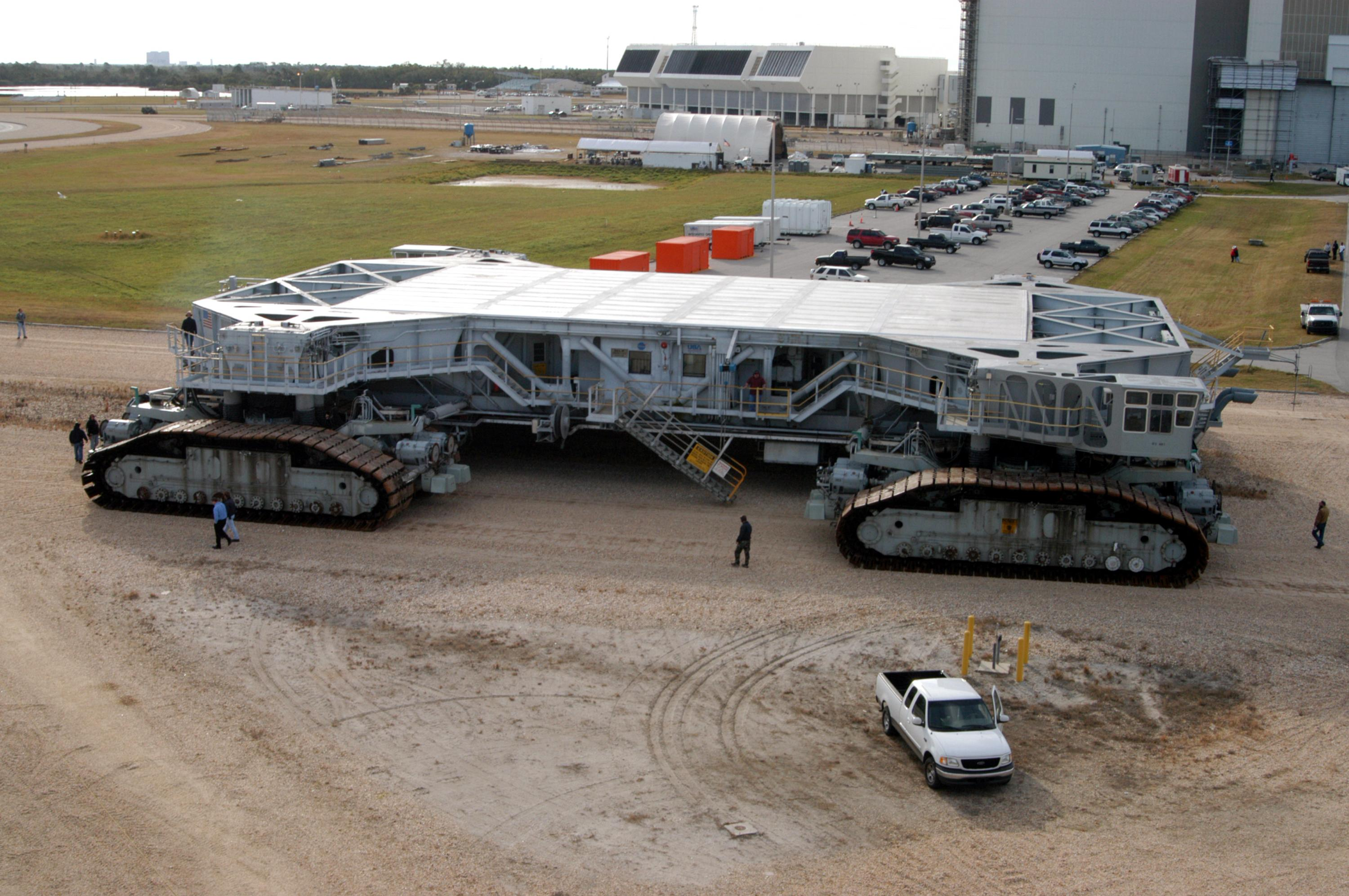
One of two crawler-transporters built by Marion and used by NASA for transporting rockets

Marion designed and built the NASA Crawler-transporter used to transport both the Saturn V rocket, as well as the Space Shuttle.

=== Osgood Company acquisition ===
In 1955, Marion Power Shovel acquired its crosstown rival, the Osgood Company, which manufactured shovels under the Marion-Osgood and Osgood names. Osgood's product line complemented Marion Power Shovel's, with most of Osgood's product line focusing on shovels, cranes and draglines that were small capacity machines as opposed to Marion's line, which focused increasingly on high end strip mining draglines. Osgood also built road-ready mobile units that used Mack truck undercarriages.

== Acquisition and end ==
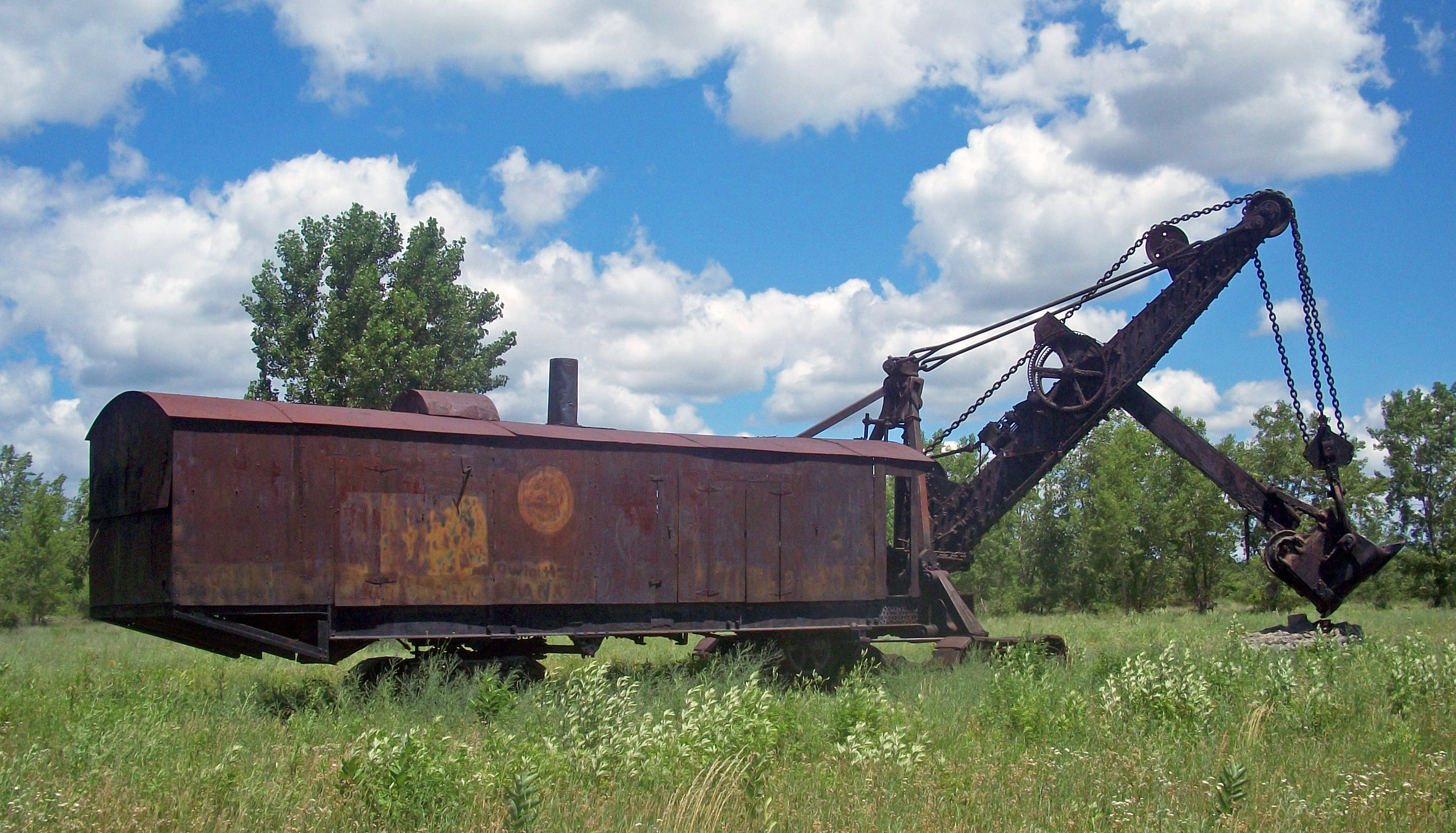
This Marion Model 91 shovel on display in Le Roy, New York is the only example known to exist. This shovel is included on the National Register of Historic Places.

The Marion Power Shovel Company was refinanced by management in the late 1960s with only the signature guarantee of the primary stockholder, billionaire Henry Hillman, of Pittsburgh, Pennsylvania and PNC Bank fame. In 1977 Dresser Industries, Inc. purchased Marion Power Shovel for approximately US$250 million. The company grew from 1,500 employees in 1974 to over 3,200 employees by 1978 under the direction of Putt McDowell during the massive growth in coal mining demand of the late 1970s.

By 1992, Dresser Industries decided to exit the production of industrial and mining equipment. The affected assets, including the Marion division, became part of Indresco, a holding company created by Dresser in 1992 and then spun off to Dresser shareholders. On November 1, 1995, Indresco changed its name to Global Industrial Technologies, Inc.

On January 23, 1997 Global Industrial Technologies announced that it was divesting certain assets, including the Marion division. Global Industrial Technologies sold the Marion Power Shovel Company, which had revenues of US$114.4 million in FY 1996, for US$40.1 million to Bucyrus International on July 23, 1997. Following the acquisition, Bucyrus International closed Marion Power Shovel Company's Marion, Ohio facility.

Historical corporate files and archives for Marion Power Shovel were split between Bowling Green, Ohio's Historical Construction Equipment Association and the Marion County Historical Society in Marion, Ohio.

== References & Sources ==
=== Sources ===
- Pierpoint, Ruth L. (2008-02-28). "National Register of Historic Places Registration Form" (PDF). nps.gov. United States Department of the Interior - National Park Service. Archived from the original (PDF) on 2009-05-31.
- "Bucyrus International To Buy Marion Power Shovel From Global Industrial Technologies" (Press release). PR Newswire Association LLC. 1997-04-08. Archived from the original on 2014-02-21. "Bucyrus, with sales of $263.8 million in 1996, combined with Marion, with sales of $111.4 million in FY 1996..."
- "Dresser Industries Makes Announcement" (Press release). PR Newswire Association LLC. 1992-02-05. Archived from the original on 2014-02-21. "Dresser Industries, Inc. (NYSE: DI), has announced its intention to spin off to its shareholders its industrial and mining equipment divisions....The businesses to be transferred include...Marion draglines and power shovels..."
- "Global Announces Sale of Marion Power Shovel, New Stock Repurchase Program" (Press release). PR Newswire Association LLC. 1997-07-23. Archived from the original on 2014-02-21. "Global Industrial Technologies, Inc. (NYSE: GIX) announced today the signing of a definitive agreement for the sale of Marion Power Shovel Company..."
- "Global Industrial Technologies Announces Divestiture of Non-Core Businesses, Earnings Outlook" (Press release). PR Newswire Association LLC. 1997-01-23. Archived from the original on 2014-02-21. "Global said The Marion Power Shovel Company, British Jeffrey Diamond of the United Kingdom and a partnership interest in Komdresco of South Africa will be sold."
- "Indresco Adopts Holding Company Structure with New Name: Global Industrial Technologies, Inc" (Press release). PR Newswire Association LLC. 1995-11-01. Archived from the original on 2014-02-21. "INDRESCO Inc., (NYSE: ID) a global manufacturer of high-tech industrial products, today announced the adoption of a holding company structure, with a new name: Global Industrial Technologies, Inc."
- "Marion Acquisition". bucyrus.com. Bucyrus International, Inc. 2010. Archived from the original on 2010-12-13. "Bucyrus acquired the Marion Power Shovel Company in 1997."

== See also ==
- Power shovel
- Dragline
- Big Muskie
- Big Brutus
- Marion Steam Shovel (Le Roy, New York)
