= Walking excavator =

Heavy all-terrain equipment

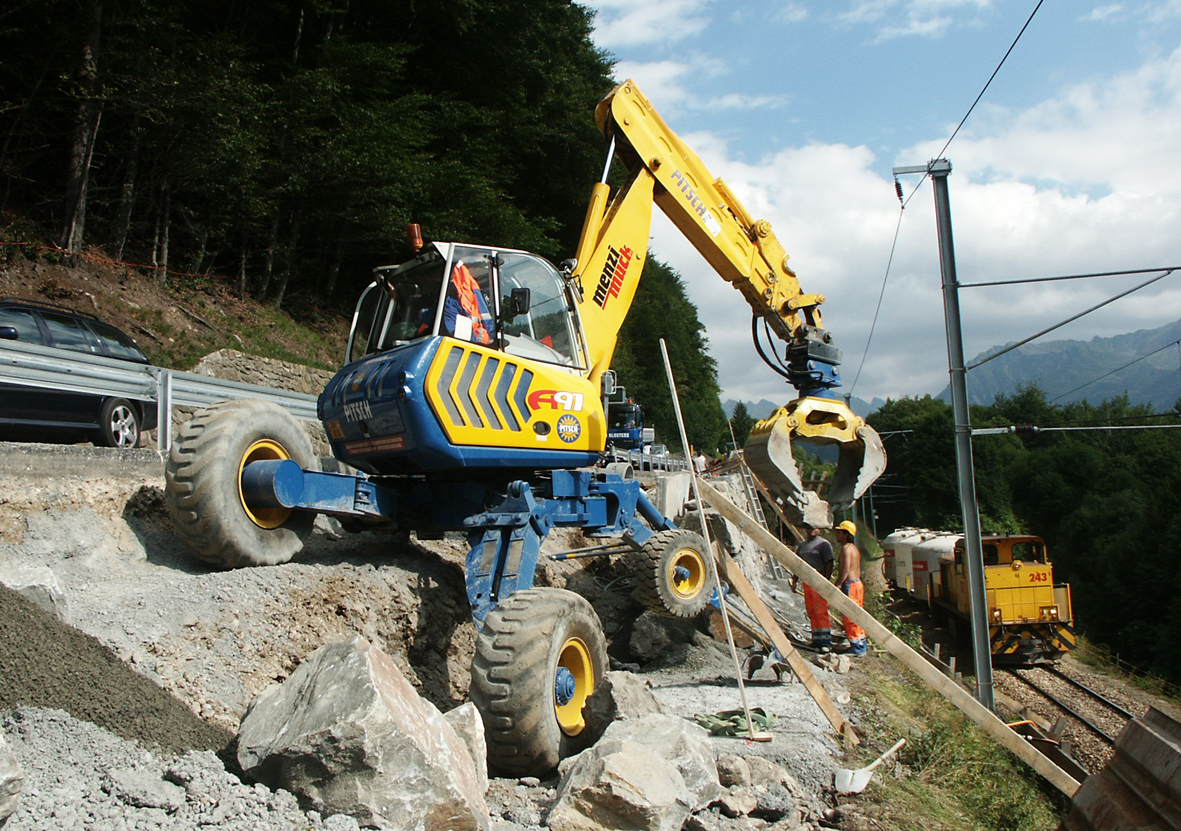
Menzi Muck A91 with a grapple

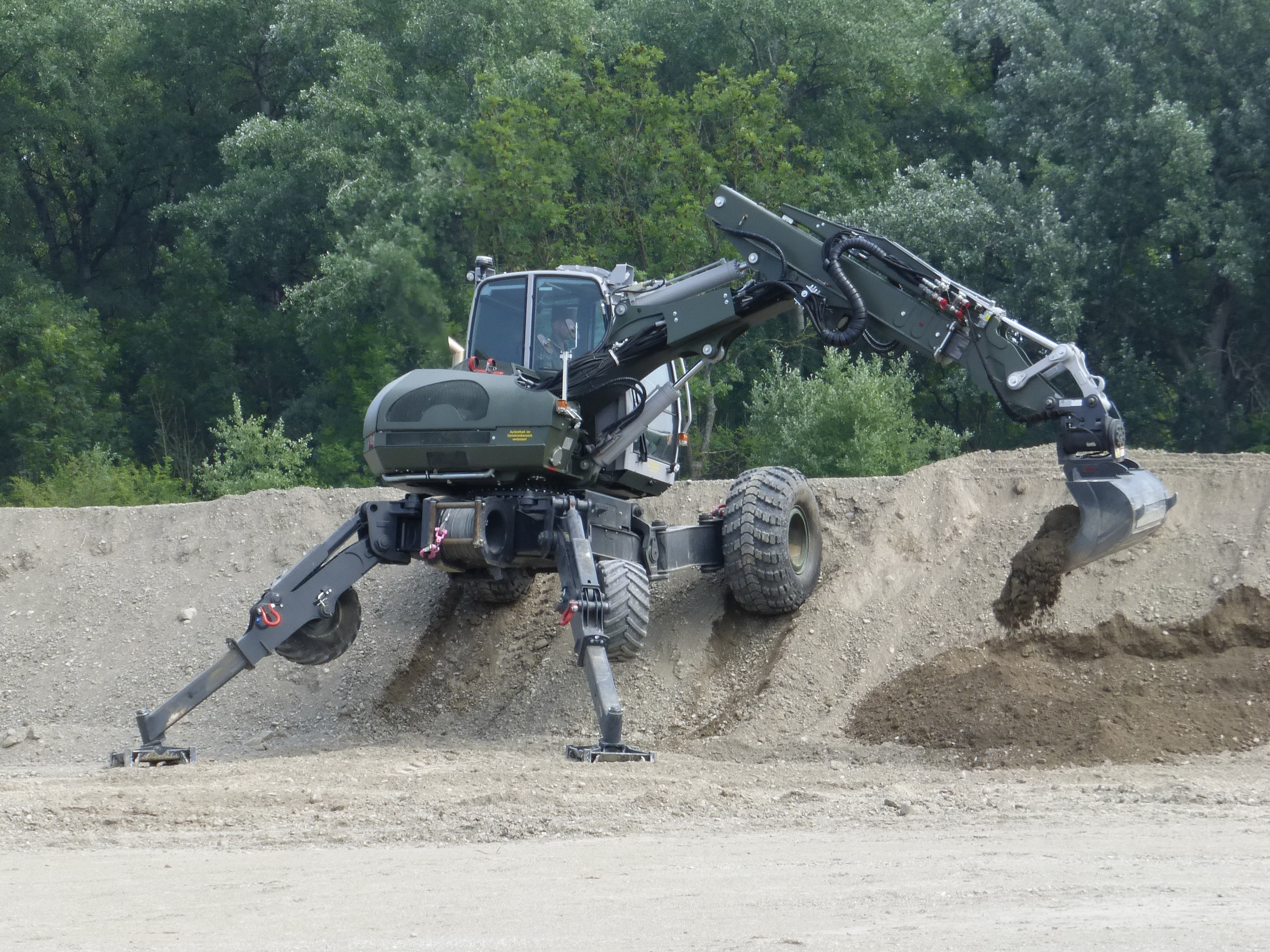
Kaiser SX of the Austrian Bundesheer

The term walking excavator may apply to two different forms of heavy equipment, the historic walking power shovel or dragline excavator that began to appear early in the 20th century, or the contemporary version of an all-terrain excavator popularly known as a spider excavator.

The original walking excavators were enormous and unwieldy machines which alternately raised and lowered sets of foot plates or sections of tracks to maneuver in all directions - albeit typically very slowly. The modern equally highly-specialized excavators (which followed a different evolutionary path and are still little known by the general public) more closely resembles as standard small excavator (complete with boom, stick, bucket and cab on a rotating platform known as the "house"). However, in place of a fixed undercarriage its house sits atop articulated limb-like extensions with or without wheels. Each can move independently when necessary, moving in spider-like motion to overcome obstacles or set itself up as a stable platform to work on uneven ground.

== Development ==
"Walking" dragline excavator animation based on Martinson's patent of 1926

The first walking excavators were power shovels and dragline excavators that moved by lifting plates or sections of tracked wheels to go forward, backward, or turn. Some of these evolved into some of the largest machines on earth.

Largely independent of this line of evolution, most traditional excavators followed that of tractors and tanks, employing tracks or standard wheels attached to fixed undercarriage, limiting their usability on steep inclines, uneven terrain or positions beyond their safe range of operation. Unlike roadgoing vehicles they typically lack suspensions to accommodate uneven ground conditions, indeed far less, with far less suspension travel and mobility, than modern tanks.

The modern walking excavator largely eliminated the fixed undercarriage in favor of an articulating one, which incorporates independently articulating "limbs" similar to those of a quaduped, characteristically ending in independently powered wheels.

The first development along this line was made in 1966 by Edwin Ernst Menzi (1897–1984) and Joseph Kaiser (1928–1993), who created a prototype excavator suitable for work on mountain slopes. Subsequently, Kaiser AG, Schaanwald, Liechtenstein, and Menzi Muck AG, Kriessern, Switzerland, developed excavators separately.

The walking excavator's main feature is the ability to move in a crab- or spider-like fashion and hence overcome any terrain obstacle. The undercarriage design varies widely from model to model and between specialized roles. The number of legs or wheels can also vary from three (Menzi Muck 5000T2) to four. The leg design can also vary from fixed to telescoping. Most walking excavators now have rotating or powered wheels, allowing them to roll or drive depending on the need.

As with backhoe operation, the boom is often employed in moving, in the walking excavator's case to overcome gaps that are wider than the reach of its legs.

Despite the advantages of the design, it has not yet been widely used for a number of reasons, including the relatively small gain in mobility; the fact that most excavation is done in urban areas; and the high cost, both of the electro-hydraulic controls and of maintenance.

Today, only spider excavators and some forest harvesters, such as the Ecolog forest harvester or the TimberPro tilt cab, are designed to move and work in mountains. In 2007, Kaiser AG, Schaanwald, Liechtenstein, realized a turnover of nearly 60 million Swiss francs.

In 2013, Menzi Muck AG had a turnover of 56.93 million Swiss francs. In 2014, Kaiser AG had a turnover of 70 million Swiss francs.

Menzi Muck AG, the walking excavator manufacturer, in collaboration with ETH Zurich, have demonstrated such remotely operated excavator at Bauma Fair 2019.

In January 2026, the United Kingdom rail regulatory authority granted engineering acceptance for the first Menzi Muck 545X RRV edition in the UK. The machine was primarily built for vegetation management company Arbor Division Ltd which commissioned Excav8 and King Rail to design and develop the rail-compliant variant.

Big Brutus was a tracked walking power shovel built in 1962 that weighed 9,300,000 pounds (4,200,000 kg) + 1,700,000 pounds (770,000 kg) ballast when operational and could go 0.22 mph (19 ft/min) (5.8m/min) on prepared level ground.

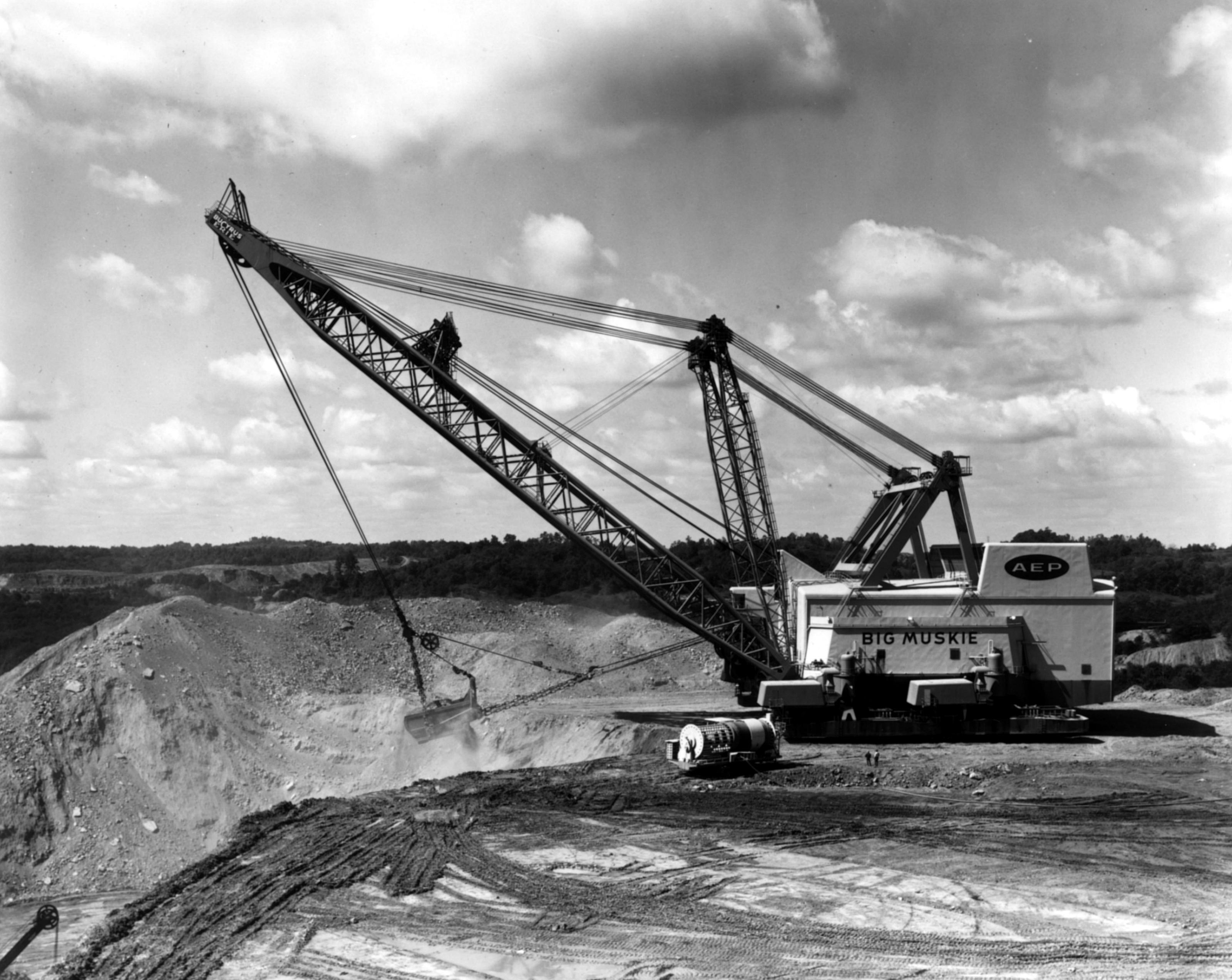
Big Muskie was built in 1969 as the world's largest ever dragline excavator, being 487 ft (148 m) in length, weighing 13,500 short tons (12,247 t), and hoisting a 220 cu yd (168.2 m^{3}) bucket that could move 325 short tons (295 t) of material at a pass. Its top speed was 0.1 miles per hour (0.16 km/h).

== See also ==
- Harvester (forestry)
- Rock crawler
