= Ursa Major (excavator) =

Largest dragline excavator in use in North America

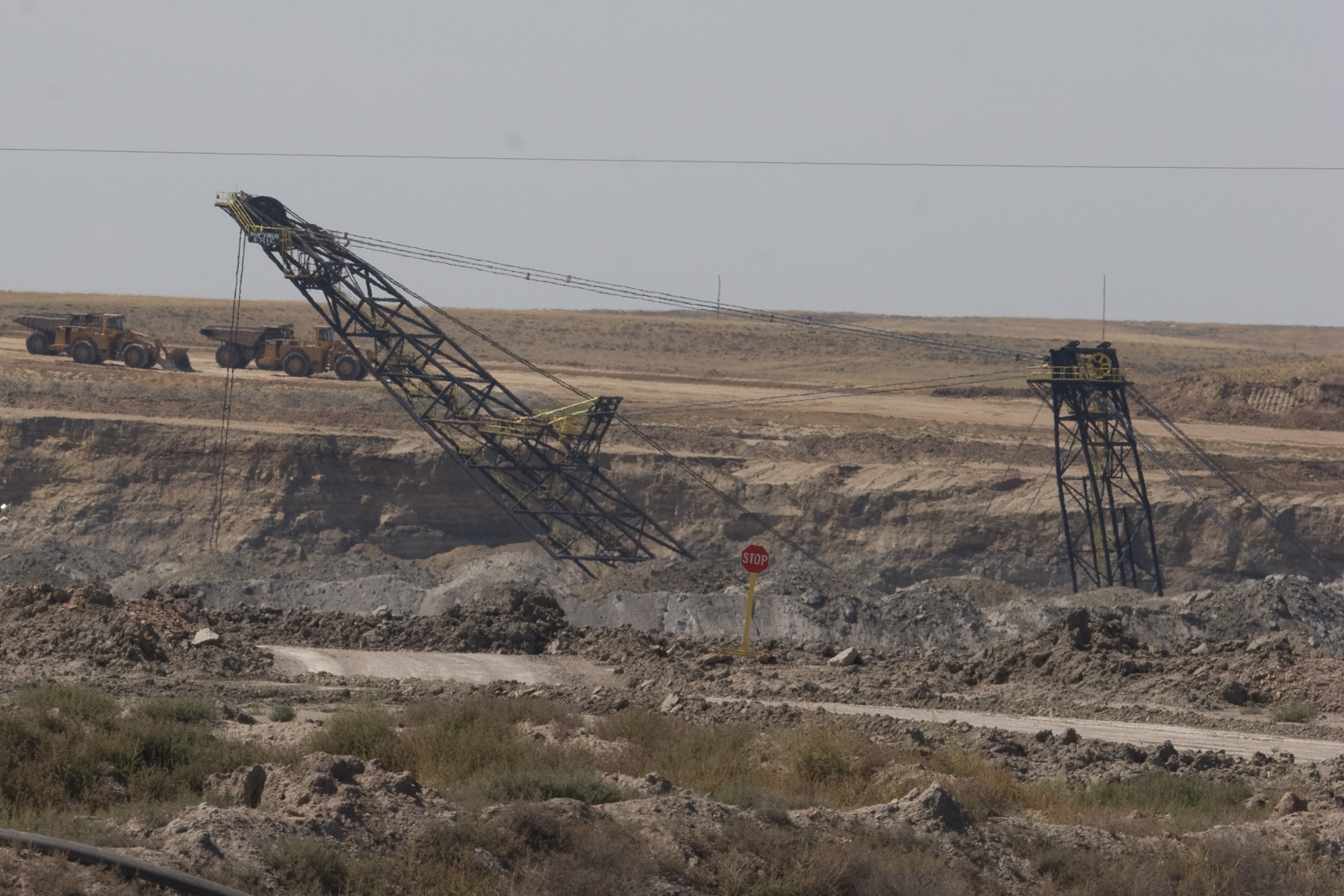
Ursa Major in 2009

The Ursa Major (lit. Great Bear) at Black Thunder Coal Mine, Wyoming, is the largest dragline excavator currently in use in North America and the third largest ever built. It is a Bucyrus-Erie 2570WS model and cost US$38 million. The Ursa Major was one of five large walking draglines operated at Black Thunder, with the next two largest in the dragline fleet being Thor, a B-E 1570W - which has a 97.5-metre (320 ft) boom and a 69-cubic-metre (90 yd^{3}) bucket - and Walking Stick, a B-E 1300W with a 92-metre (302 ft) boom and a 34-cubic-metre (44 yd^{3}) bucket.

== Specifications ==
Its bucket is 160 cubic yards (120 m^{3}), and it has a 360-foot (110 m) boom. It weighs 14.7 million pounds (6,700 t).

== History ==
Shortly before the scrapping of Big Muskie in 1999, the largest dragline ever built, construction of another ultraheavy dragline excavator commenced. Although not as large as the Big Muskie, the Ursa Major was still a large and substantial excavator.

It first began operation in 1993, the 160-cubic-yard (120 m^{3}) bucket which was newly cast at the time, was delivered at Black Thunder Mine. Operation to deliver the 165,000 pound bucket (82.5 tons) Bucyrus had to obtain special permits for an overweight and oversized load for it to be permissible to be transported. The company also had to check with the power company to make sure it won't hit any power lines on the way to the mine.

== See also ==
- Dragline excavator
