= Marion 6360 =

Giant power shovel

Marion 6360 "The Captain"
- Type: Electric power shovel
- Manufacturer: Marion Power Shovel
- Production: 1965
- Length: 97 m (319 ft)
- Width: 27 m (88 ft)
- Height: 64 m (210 ft)
- Weight: 12,700 t (28,000,000 lb)
- Propulsion: 8 x caterpillar tracks
- Gross power: 22.37 megawatts of electricity from twenty main-drive motors powered from four 14,000 volt AC power motor generator sets
- Speed: 0.25 mph or 0.4 km/h
- Blade capacity: 180 cubic yards (137.6 m^{3}) or 151.2 short tons (137.2 t)

Marion 6360, known as "the Captain", was a giant power shovel built by the Marion Power Shovel company. Completed and commissioned on October 15, 1965, it was one of the largest land vehicles ever built, exceeded only by some dragline and bucket-wheel excavators. The shovel originally started work with Southwestern Illinois Coal Corporation, but the owners were soon bought out by Arch Coal. Everything remained the same at the mine except for the colors which were changed to red, white, and blue. Like most mining vehicles of extreme size, the Marion 6360 required a surprisingly small crew to operate it (a total of four people) consisting of an operator, oiler, welder, and a ground man who looked after the trailing cable.

The shovel worked well for Arch Coal until September 9, 1991, when a fire broke out in the lower works of the shovel, caused by a burst hydraulic line that sprayed the hot fluids on an electrical relay panel. This fire caused a great deal of damage to both the lower works and machine house. Afterwards, engineers from both Arch and Marion Power Shovel surveyed the damage and deemed it too great to repair, and the machine was scrapped one year later in the last pit it dug.

The only Marion shovel that compared (in size and scope) to "The Captain" was the Marion 5960-M Power Shovel that worked at Peabody Coal Company's (Peabody Energy) River Queen Surface Mine in Central City, Kentucky. It was named the "Big Digger" and carried a 125-cubic-yard (96 m^{3}) bucket on a 215-foot-long (66 m) boom. It was Marion Power Shovel's second largest machine ever built and the third largest shovel in the world. This "sister shovel" was scrapped in early 1990 in Muhlenberg County, Kentucky.

== Specifics ==
- Boom Length: 215 feet (66 m)
- Bucket Capacity: 180 cubic yards (140 m^{3}) (double doors)
- Dipper Stick Length: 133 feet (41 m)
- Overall Weight: 12,700 tons (28,000,000 lbs)
- Total Height: 210 feet (64 m)
- Crawler Height: 16 feet (4.9 m)
- Crawler Unit Length: 45 feet (14 m)
- Individual Crawler Width: 10 feet (3.0 m)
- Individual Track Shoe Weight: 3.5 tons (42 shoes per track)
- Clearance Under Shovel: 16 feet (4.9 m) to the first level of the Lower Works
- Largest Shovel In The World & Largest Ever Built By Marion--
- Started Service: 1965
- Dismantled: 1992
- Power 30,000 bhp (30,416 PS; 22,371 kW)
- Build time (site erection) 18 months & 150,000 man hours

== See also ==
- Bagger 288
- Bagger 293
- Big Muskie
- The Silver Spade
- Big Brutus
- Bucyrus-Erie
- Bucket-wheel excavator
- Dragline
- Excavator
- Power Shovel
