= The Silver Spade =

Power shovel used in southeastern Ohio

Coordinates: 40°11′24″N 81°03′15″W

1950-B "The Silver Spade"
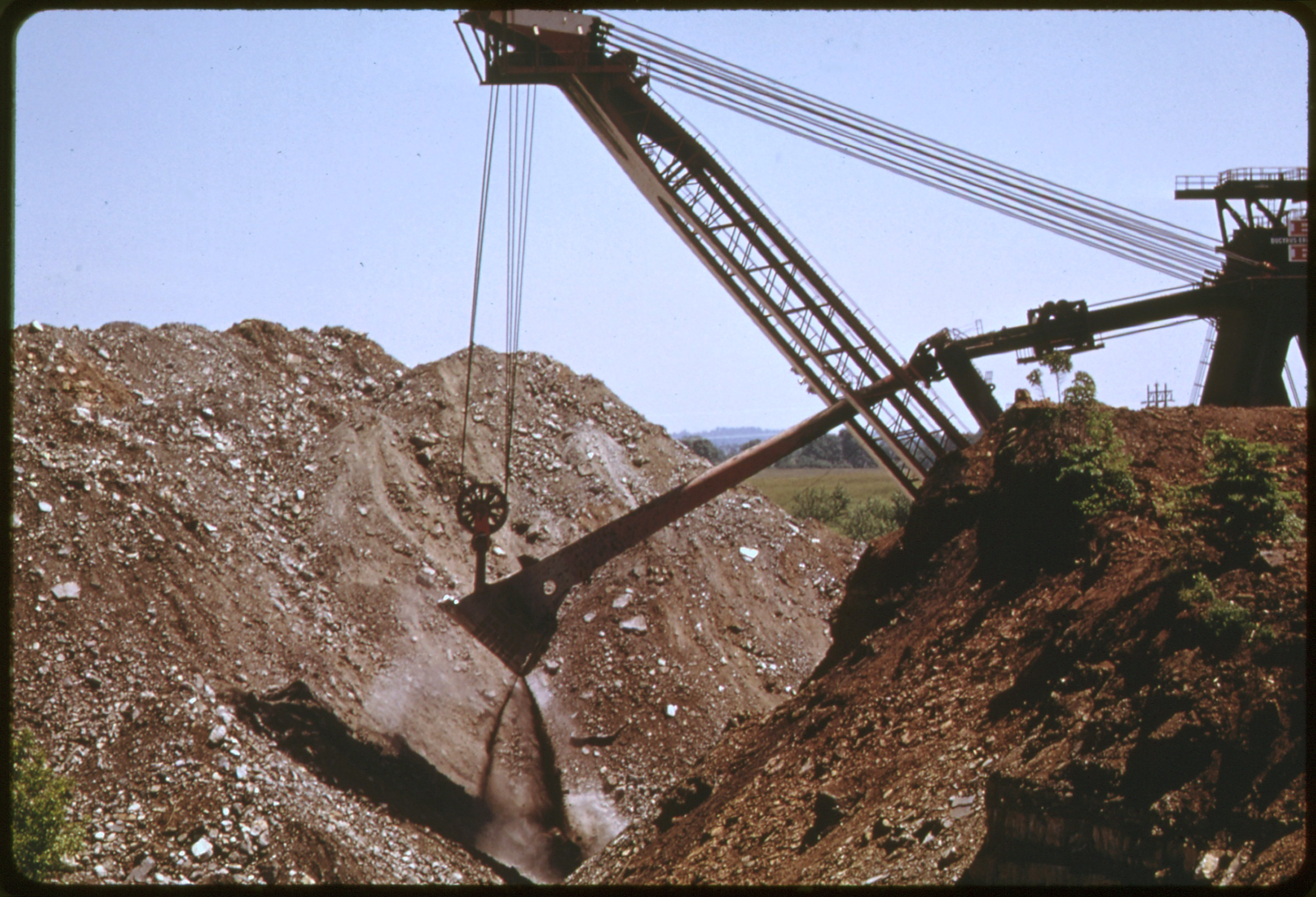
- The Silver Spade working near Cadiz, Ohio, in July, 1974
- Type: Electric power shovel
- Manufacturer: Bucyrus-Erie
- Production: 1967
- Length: 79 m (259 ft)
- Width: 18 m (59 ft)
- Height: 67 m (220 ft)
- Weight: 6,400 t (14,100,000 lb)
- Propulsion: 8 x caterpillar tracks
- Gross power: 13,500 hp or 10.1 megawatts
- Speed: 0.25 mph or 0.4 km/h
- Blade capacity: 105 cubic yards (80.3 m^{3}) or 28.35 short tons (25.72 t)

The Silver Spade was a giant power shovel used for strip mining in southeastern Ohio. Manufactured by Bucyrus-Erie, South Milwaukee, Wisconsin, the Silver Spade was one of two model 1950-B shovels built, the other being its sister ship, the GEM of Egypt. Its sole function was to remove the earth and rock overburden from the coal seam. Attempts to purchase and preserve the shovel from Consol to make it the centerpiece of a mining museum exhibit for $2.6 million fell short. A salvage company began scrapping the machine in January 2007. The boom was dropped using explosives on February 9th, ending any rescue attempts. By March 1st, much of the machine had been cut away.

== Facts and figures ==
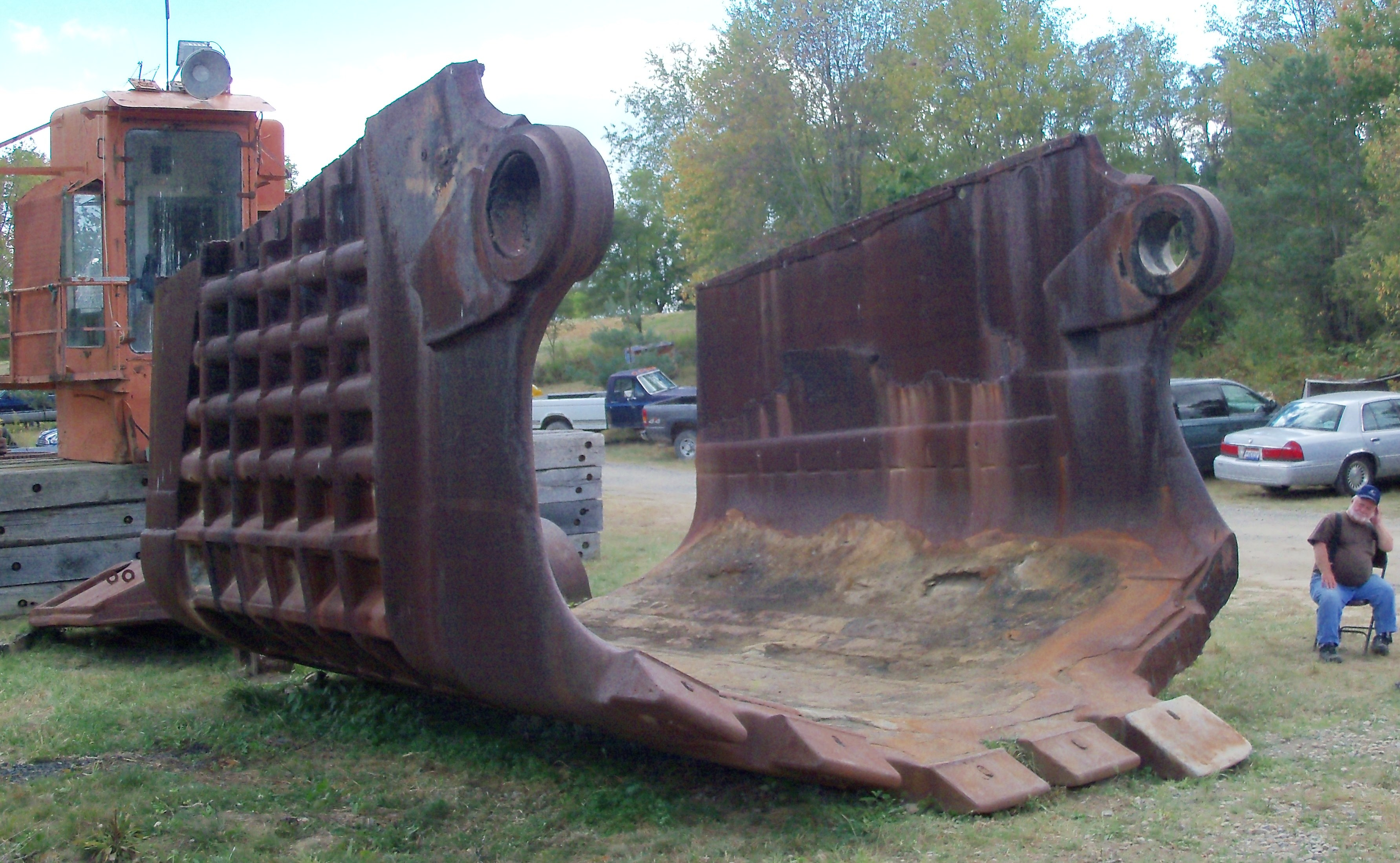
Bucket and cab of The Silver Spade at Harrison Coal and Reclamation Park on Stumptown Road.

- Began operations – November 1965
- Ended operations – April 2006
- Speed – 1/4 mph (400 m/h)
- Bucket capacity – 105 cu yd (80 m^{3})
- Operating weight – 14,000,000 lb (7,000 short tons, 6,400 metric tons)
- Height – 220 ft to top of boom (67 m)
- Boom length – 200 feet (61 m)
- Width – 59 ft (18 m)
- Height of crawlers – 8 ft (2.5 m)
- Length of crawlers – 34 ft (10 m)
- Maximum dumping height – 139 ft (42 m)
- Maximum dumping radius – 195 ft (59 m)
- Rating on A.C. motors – 13,500 hp (10.1 MW) peak
- Entire operation of the shovel was controlled by two hand levers and a pair of foot pedals.
- Dug 315,000 lb (143 metric tons) of earth in a single bite, swung 180°, and deposited the load up to 390 ft (119 m) away from the digging points at heights up to 140 ft (42.5 m).
- Machine's four 2 5/8-inch-diameter (67 mm) hoist ropes totaled 3,000 ft (914 m) in length.
- Fourteen main digging cycle motors could develop a combined peak of 13,500 hp (10.1 MW) at peak load.
- Automatically leveled through four 54-inch-diameter (1,400 mm) hydraulic jacks.
- Swung a 105 cubic yard (80 m^{3}) dipper from a 200 ft (61 m) boom and a 122 ft (37 m) dipper handle.
- The "GEM of Egypt," the other large shovel, had similar size and weight, etc. statistics. The primary difference was the bucket and boom. The GEM was a 130 cubic-yard (99.4 m^{3}) bucket and 170 ft (52 m) boom, while the Spade sported 105 cubic-yard (80 m^{3}) bucket and 200 ft (61 m) boom.

== Dipper arm ==
The design is unusual, as it uses a knee action crowd, and only these two Bucyrus-Erie 1950-Bs were fitted with this technology.

In a power shovel

- crowding is pushing the bucket at the end of a "handle" ("dipper" or "dipper stick") in or out to control the depth of cut or to position for dumping
- With knee-action, the handle is connected to a moveable pivot point rather than being supported directly by the boom.
  - Knee action design made possible the largest shovel ever built, increased digging power, allowed the bucket to move horizontally into the cut and improved swing efficiency, distance, and radius.

The technology was a requirement of the owners and had to be licensed from Marion Power Shovel, with Marion being allowed to use Bucyrus-Erie's cable crowd system in return.

== See also ==
- Big Brutus
- Big Muskie
- Dragline
- Haul truck
- Excavator
- Marion 6360
