= Bucyrus-Erie =

Defunct American mining equipment company

Bucyrus International, Inc.
- Company type: Subsidiary
- Traded as: Nasdaq: BUCY
- Industry: Machinery manufacturing
- Predecessor: Bucyrus Foundry and Manufacturing Company (1880–1893); Bucyrus Steam Shovel and Dredge Company of Wisconsin (1893–1895); The Bucyrus Company (1895–1911); Bucyrus Company (1911–1927); Bucyrus-Erie Company (1927–1996)
- Founded: 1880; 146 years ago, in Bucyrus, Ohio, United States
- Founder: Daniel P. Eells et al.
- Defunct: July 2011
- Fate: Purchased by Caterpillar Inc.
- Headquarters: South Milwaukee, Wisconsin, United States
- Area served: Worldwide
- Products: 8750 Dragline; RH400 Hydraulic Excavator; MT6300AC Mining Truck
- Services: Maintenance
- Parent: Caterpillar Inc.

Bucyrus-Erie was an American surface and underground mining equipment company. It was founded as Bucyrus Foundry and Manufacturing Company in Bucyrus, Ohio, in 1880. Bucyrus moved its headquarters to South Milwaukee, Wisconsin, in 1893. In 1927, Bucyrus merged with the Erie Steam Shovel Company to form Bucyrus-Erie. In 1997, it was renamed Bucyrus International, Inc. In 2010 the enterprise was purchased by Caterpillar in a US$7.6 billion ($8.6 billion including net debt) transaction that closed on July 8, 2011. At the time of its acquisition, the Bucyrus product line included a range of material removal and material handling products used in both surface and underground mining.

== History ==
=== 1880-1927 ===
Bucyrus was an early producer of steam shovels in its Bucyrus, Ohio headquarters and manufacturing facility. In 1893, Bucyrus moved its operations to South Milwaukee, Wisconsin.

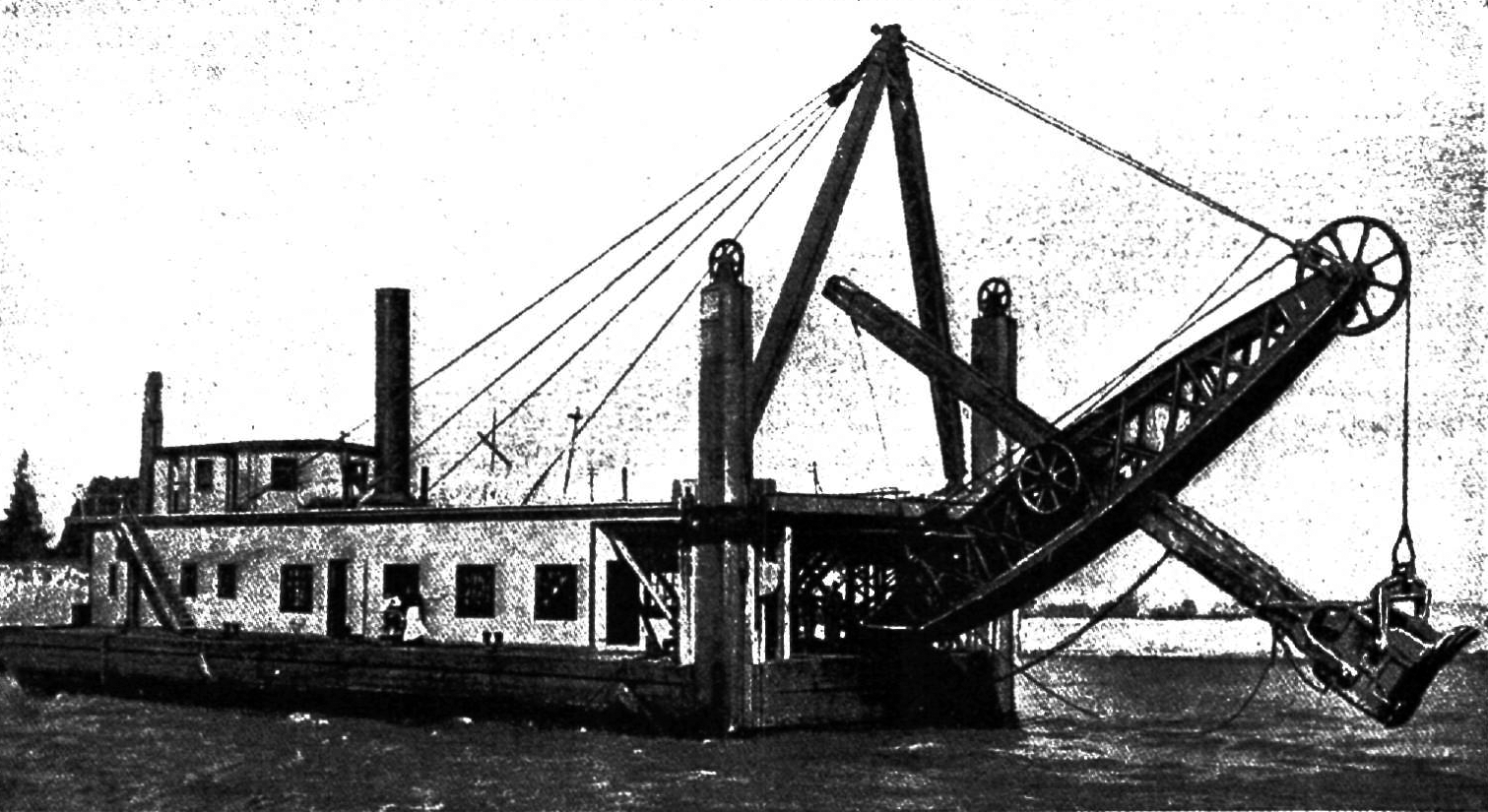
A Bucyrus steam shovel working in the Panama Canal

In 1904 Bucyrus supplied 77 of the 102 steam shovels used to dig the Panama Canal. These were 95 ton models with five-cubic-yard buckets that could move approximately eight tons of material at once. They were operated by a crew of four. Similar to a locomotive, the crew was headed by an engineer, and included two firemen who stoked the boiler with coal, and a craneman. A support crew of six on the ground laid rails on which the shovel moved. A photograph of President Theodore Roosevelt was taken in November 1906 operating a Bucyrus shovel in Panama during his inspection trip. In March 1910, a single Bucyrus shovel excavated 70,000 cubic yards in 26 days at the Culebra Cut, setting a canal construction record. Each shovel averaged over 1,000,000 cubic yards of earth excavated at the cut.

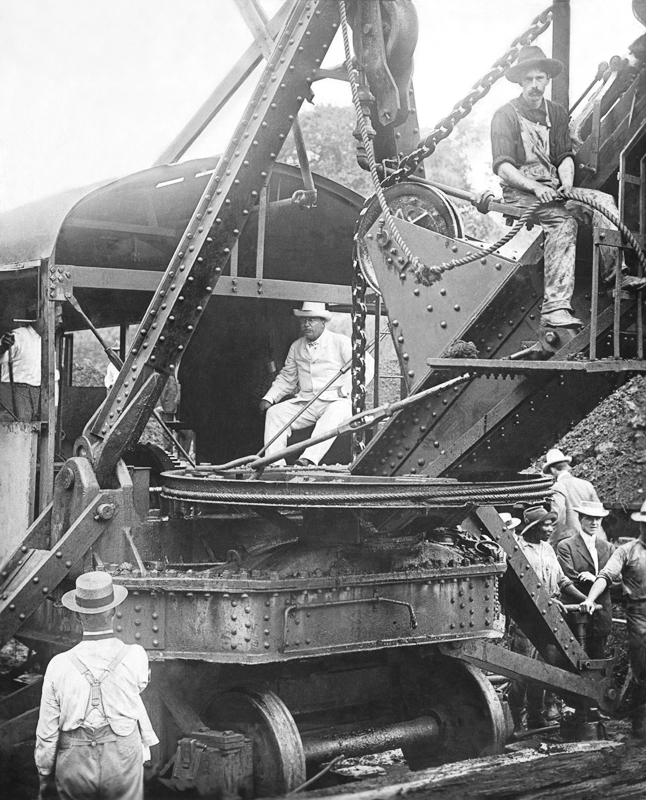
Theodore Roosevelt on a Bucyrus shovel in the Panama Canal in 1906

=== 1927-1980 ===
The company changed its name to Bucyrus-Erie in 1927 when it merged with the Erie Steam Shovel Company, the country's leading manufacturer of small excavators at that time.

In 1930 Bucyrus joined with Ruston & Hornsby Ltd Lincoln, England, forming the Ruston-Bucyrus Ltd firm in England. Ruston & Hornsby Ltd were the pre-eminent manufacturers of steam excavators at the time, having started in 1874. The merger gave the company access to previously unavailable world markets.

=== 1980-2011 ===
Ruston & Hornsby Ltd sold their share in Ruston-Bucyrus in 1985, during a period of recession and consolidation in the mining industry, as they divested non-core businesses to survive.

For a time in the 1980s the company was known as Becor Western following its merger with Western Gear.

On February 18, 1994, Bucyrus-Erie filed for Chapter 11 bankruptcy, and remained under bankruptcy protection until December 14, 1994.

The company adopted the name Bucyrus International, Inc. in 1997.

Bucyrus built hundreds of large mining machines, as well as construction equipment, competing with Marion Power Shovel. Bucyrus acquired Marion Power Shovel in 1997.

On May 4, 2007, Bucyrus completed the acquisition of the DBT Group, a Lunen, Germany-based manufacturer of underground mining equipment, from Ruhrkohle AG of Herne, Germany. Bucyrus acquired DBT because DBT's underground mining equipment complemented Bucyrus' surface mining products.

In February 2010, Bucyrus International completed a US$1.3 billion acquisition of the mining equipment division of Terex Corporation, which partly sprang from O&K, including worlds largest hydraulic excavator RH 400, later produced as Cat 6090.

On November 15, 2010, Bucyrus agreed to be acquired by Caterpillar in a transaction valued at US$8.6 billion. Caterpillar said it intended to create a new mining business headquarters at the former Bucyrus headquarters location in South Milwaukee. The transaction closed in mid-2011.

The Intellectual Property Rights for Bucyrus Erie marine cranes was acquired by Sparrows Group which has crane manufacturing operations based in Houston, Texas

== Products ==
Bucyrus owned the Bucyrus, Bucyrus-Erie, Marion, and Ransomes & Rapier brands and provided OEM parts and support services for machinery which bears those brands.

=== Historical ===
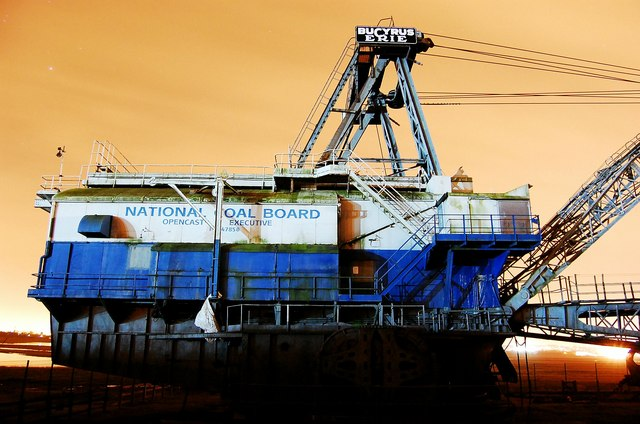
Bucyrus-Erie 1150RB walking dragline preserved at St Aidan's opencast coal mine, Yorkshire, England

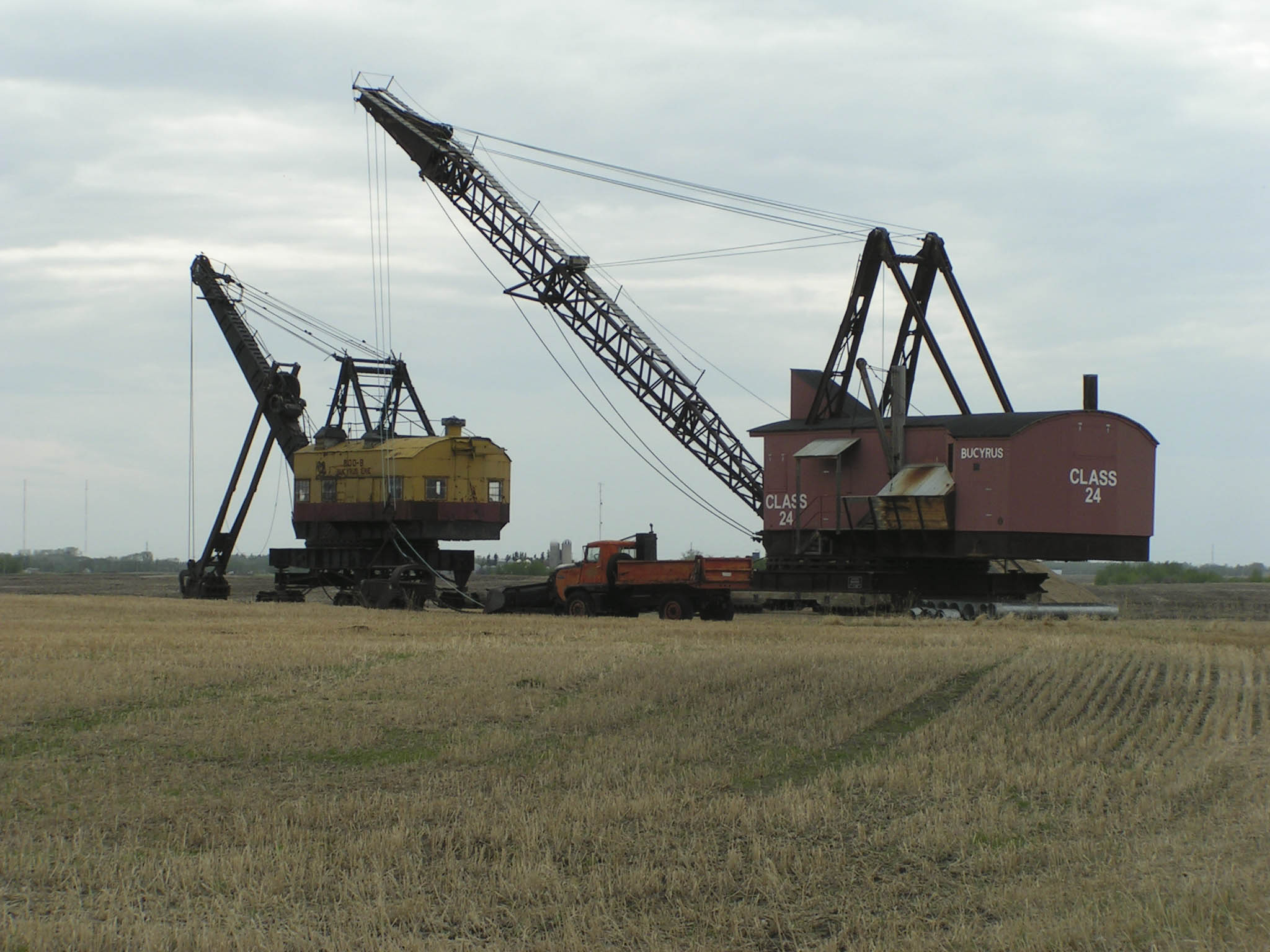
A 200-B power shovel, and a Class 24 on display at the Reynolds-Alberta Museum

- 4250-W walking dragline, also known as Big Muskie, was built in 1969, with a 220-cubic-yard (170 m^{3}) bucket and weighed 13,000 metric tons. Big Muskie's 220-cubic-yard (170 m^{3}) bucket is currently near McConnellsville, Ohio in a small park dedicated to coal mining.
- 3850-B power shovels for stripping, one built each in 1962 and 1964, with bucket capacities of 115 and 145 yd^{3} (88 and 111 m^{3}).
- 2570-W or WS, one of B-E's most popular dragline models with bucket capacities between 120 and 160 yd^{3} (92 and 122 m^{3}). Ursa Major at Black Thunder Coal Mine was reported to be the third largest dragline ever built.
- The Silver Spade and its twin the GEM of Egypt, 1950B power shovels, were built in 1965 and 1967 respectively, with a bucket capacity of 80 m^{3} (100 yd^{3}). The Silver Spade was dismantled in 2007.
- Big Brutus, an 1850-B power shovel, was built in 1962, with a 90-yard bucket. It is in West Mineral, Kansas, as the centerpiece of a museum.
- Bucyrus-Erie 50-R, 55 feet high and housing a massive drill, was used in the successful rescue of two miners during the 1963 Sheppton, Pennsylvania mining disaster.
- 1250-B/W and 1260-W walking draglines, with buckets between 33 and 45 yd^{3} (25 and 34 m^{3}).
- 5-W walking dragline, with a 5-cubic-yard (3.8 m^{3}) bucket and produced until around 1970.
- 1150RB walking dragline, transported to Britain in 1946 as part of the Marshall Plan. It was used to remove overburden at various mines around the UK, lastly at St Aidan's opencast coal mine, Yorkshire, until the River Aire burst its banks and flooded the mine in March 1988. It has been preserved as a static monument at the site.
