= Big Brutus =

Power shovel used in southeastern Kansas strip mining

Coordinates: 37.273882°N 94.938827°W

Bucyrus Erie Model 1850-B "Big Brutus"
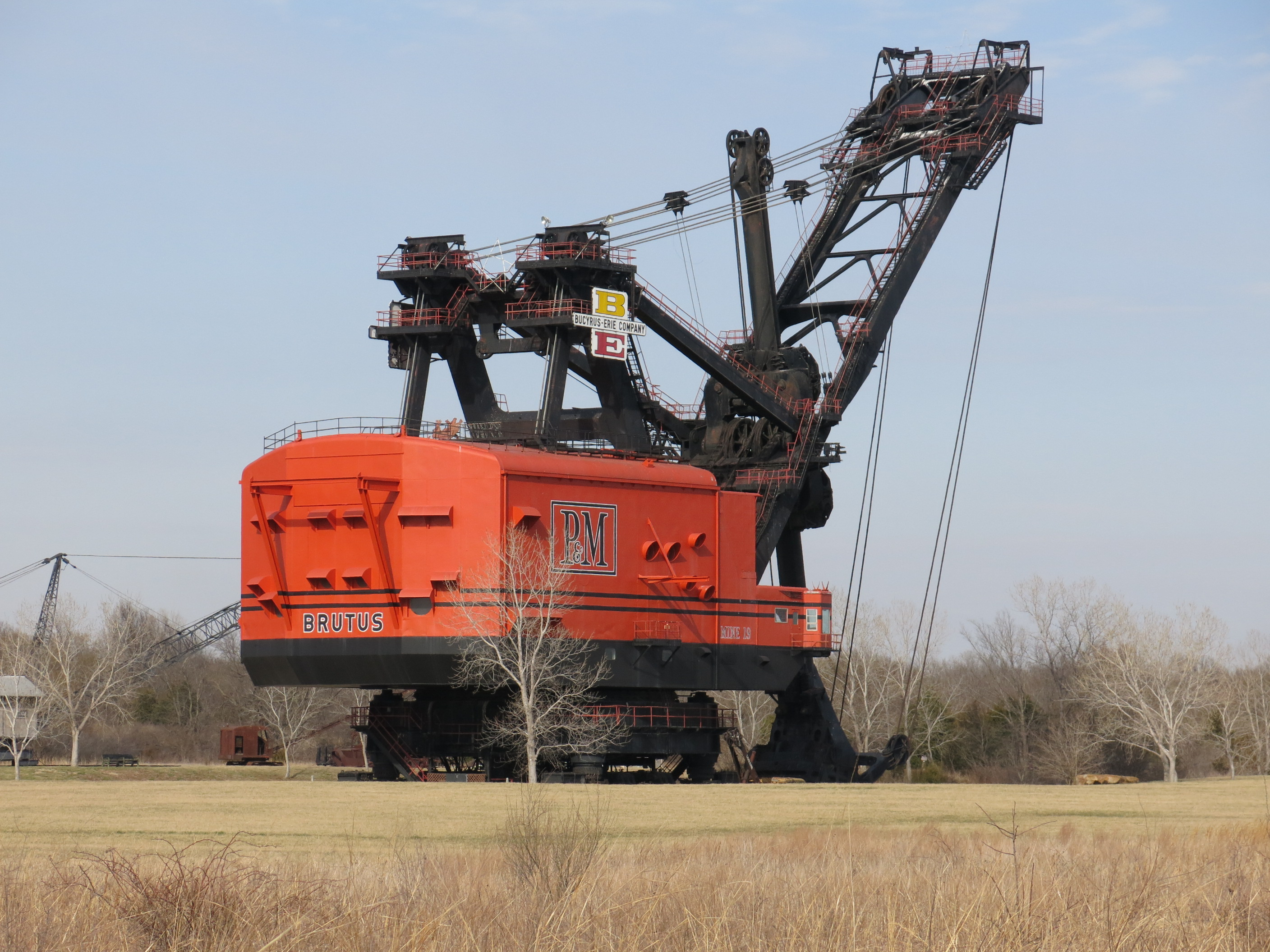
- Big Brutus in 2014
- Type: Electric shovel
- Manufacturer: Bucyrus-Erie
- Production: 1 unit made; June 1962 to May 1963 for $6.5 million
- Length: 79.5 feet (24.2 m) (house)
- Width: 58 feet (18 m) (house)
- Height: 160 feet (48.8 m) (to tip of boom)
- Weight: 9,300,000 pounds (4,200,000 kg) + 1,700,000 pounds (770,000 kg) ballast when operational
- Propulsion: Crawler tracks
- Gross power: ≥7,500 hp (standard), ≥15,000 hp (peak)
- Speed: 0.22 mph (19 ft/min) (5.8m/min) max
- Blade capacity: 90 cubic yards (68.8 m^{3}) or 150 short tons (140 t)

- Big Brutus
- U.S. National Register of Historic Places
- Built: 1963
- NRHP reference No.: 100001945
- Added to NRHP: January 5, 2018

Note cars by track for scale

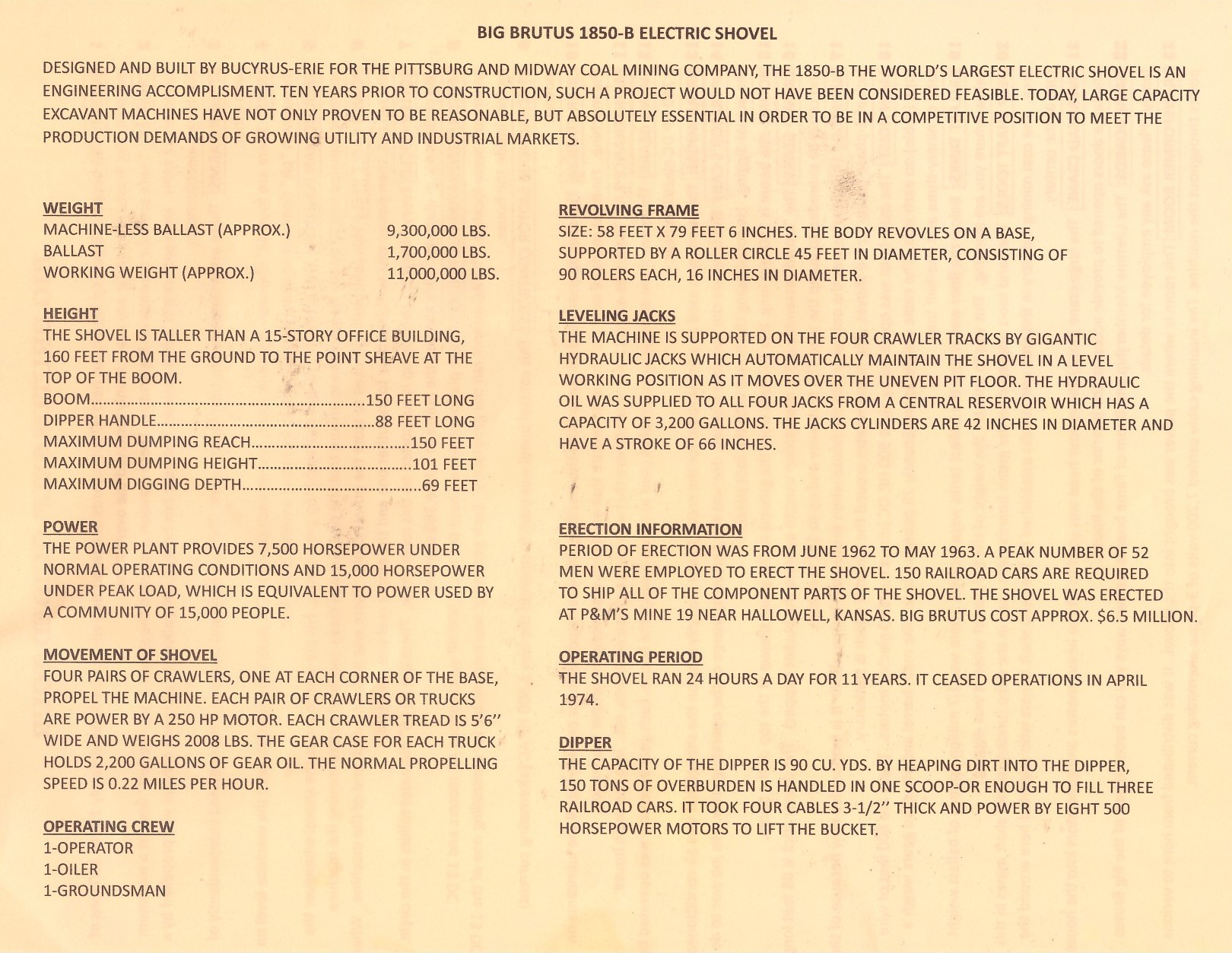
Big Brutus fact sheet

Big Brutus is the nickname of the Bucyrus-Erie model 1850-B electric power shovel, which was the second largest of its type in operation in the 1960s and 1970s. Big Brutus is the centerpiece of a mining museum in West Mineral, Kansas, United States, where it was used in coal strip mining operations. The shovel was designed to dig from 20 to 69 feet (6.1 to 21.0 m) down to unearth relatively shallow coal seams, which would then be mined with smaller equipment.

== Description ==
The fabrication of Big Brutus was completed in May 1963, after which it was shipped on 150 railroad cars to be assembled in Kansas. It operated until 1974, when coal was uneconomic to mine at the site. At that time, it was considered too big to move and was left in place. Big Brutus is now displayed at the Mined Land Wildlife Area which consists of once-mined land that is now a recreational area.

Big Brutus, while not the largest electric shovel ever built, is the largest electric shovel still in existence. The Captain, at 28 million pounds (13 kt) – triple that of Big Brutus – was the largest shovel and one of the largest land-based mobile machines ever built, only exceeded by some dragline and bucket-wheel excavators. It was scrapped in 1992, after receiving extreme damage from an hours-long internal fire.

== Museum ==
The Pittsburg & Midway Coal Mining Company donated Big Brutus in 1984 as the core of a mining museum which opened in 1985. In 1987, the American Society of Mechanical Engineers designated Big Brutus a Regional Historic Mechanical Engineering Landmark. It was listed on the National Register of Historic Places in 2018.

The museum offers tours and camping.

On January 16, 2010, Mark Mosley, a 49-year-old dentist from Lowell, Arkansas, died attempting to base-jump from the top of the boom. Climbing the boom had been prohibited years earlier; after the accident, the attraction's board of directors considered additional restrictions on climbing. During the accident's investigation, examiner Tom Dolphin determined that Mosley had accidentally fallen off the boom while preparing to jump.

== See also ==
- Bucket wheel excavator
- Dragline – Piece of heavy equipment used in civil engineering and surface mining
- Excavator
- Marion Power Shovel
- Power shovel – Bucket-equipped machine used for digging and loading earth
- National Register of Historic Places listings in Cherokee County, Kansas
- The Silver Spade
