= Big Muskie =

Former dragline excavator

Coordinates: 39°41′57″N 81°43′52″W

4250-W "Big Muskie"
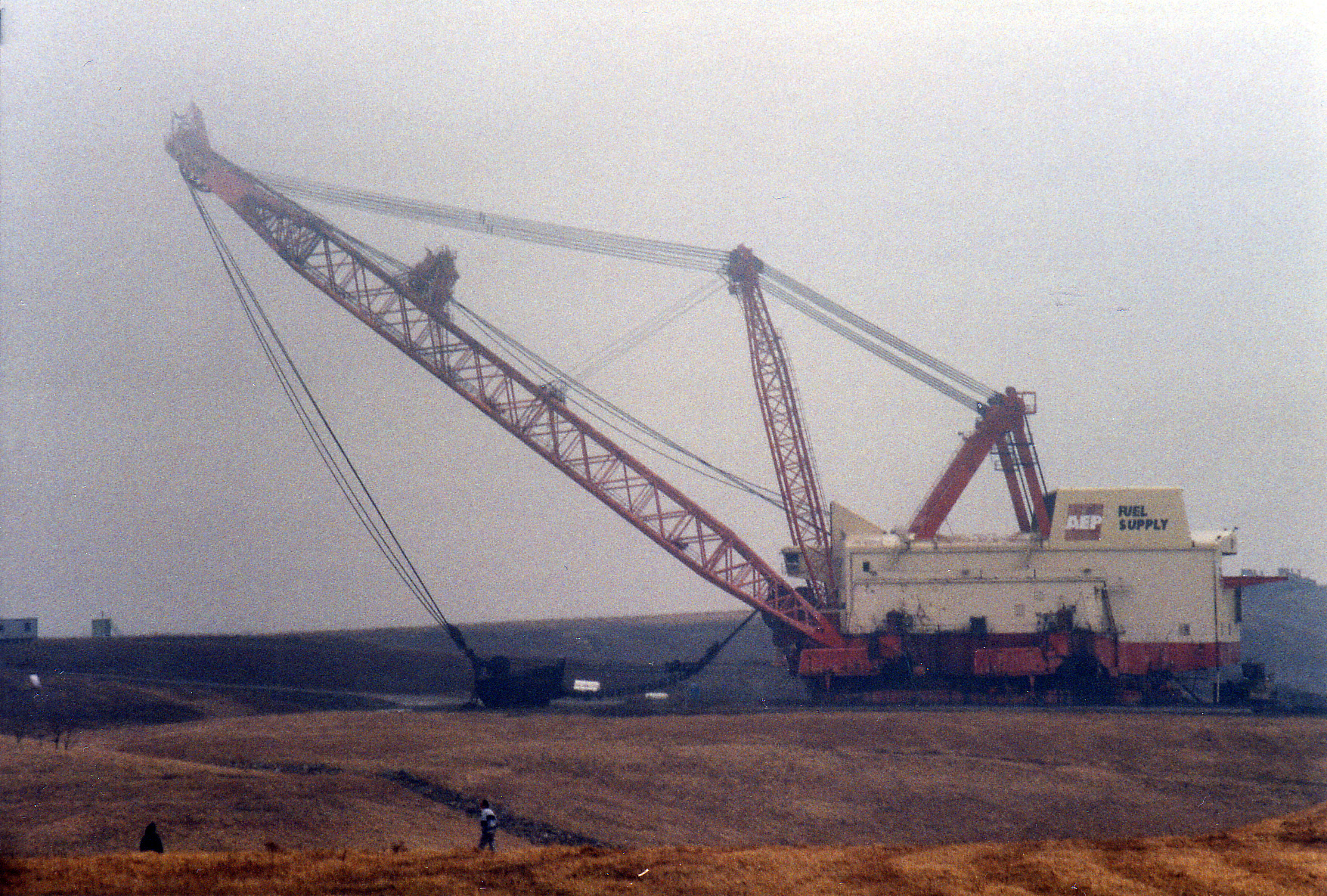
- Big Muskie in February 1999
- Type: Dragline excavator
- Manufacturer: Bucyrus-Erie
- Production: 1969
- Length: 487 ft (148 m)
- Width: 151 ft (46 m)
- Height: 222 ft (68 m)
- Weight: 13,500 short tons (12,247 t)
- Propulsion: 2x hydraulically driven walker feet
- Gross power: 18.04 megawatts of electricity supplied via trailing cable, total 13,800 volts of electrical power
- Speed: 0.1 miles per hour (0.16 km/h)
- Blade capacity: 220 cubic yards (168.2 m^{3}) or 325 short tons (295 t)

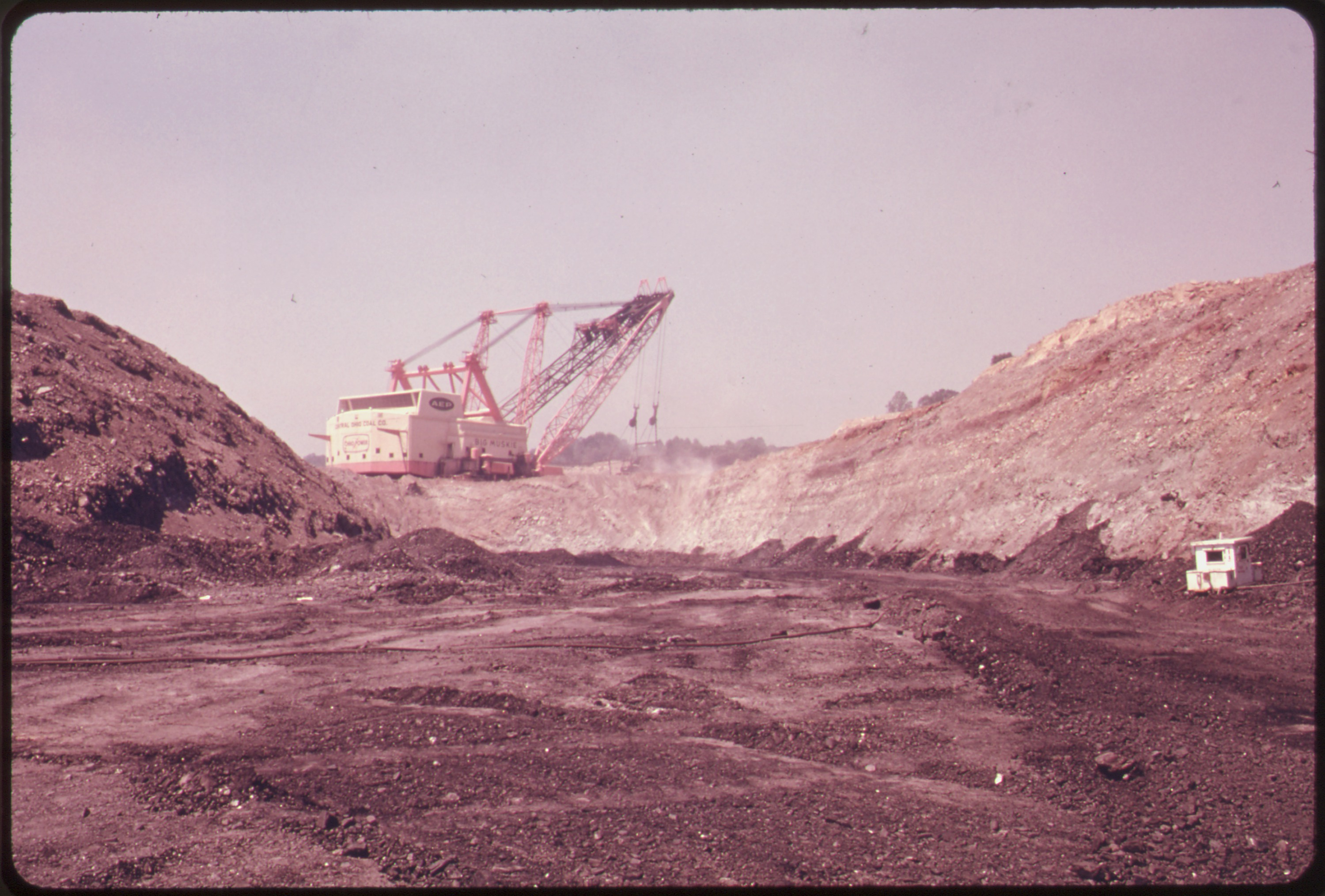
Big Muskie near Chandlersville, Ohio, July 1974

Big Muskie was a dragline excavator built by Bucyrus-Erie and owned by the Central Ohio Coal Company (formerly a division of American Electric Power), weighing 13,500 short tons (12,200 t) and standing 22 stories tall. It mined coal in the U.S. state of Ohio from 1969 to 1991. It was dismantled and sold for scrap in 1999.

== Design specifications and service ==
The Big Muskie was a model 4250-W dragline and was the only one ever built by the Bucyrus-Erie company. With a 220-cubic-yard (170 m^{3}) bucket, it was the largest single-bucket digging machine ever created and one of the world's largest mobile earth-moving machines alongside the Illinois-based Marion 6360 stripping shovel called The Captain and the German bucket wheel excavators of the Bagger 288 and Bagger 293 family. The bucket alone could hold two Greyhound buses side by side. It took over 200,000 man hours to construct over a period of about two years and cost $25 million in 1969, the equivalent of $219 million today adjusted for inflation.

Specifications
| Manufacturer: | Bucyrus-Erie |
| Model: | 4250-W, "Big Muskie" |
| Weight: | 27,000,000 pounds (13,500 short tons; 12,247 t) |
| Bucket Capacity: | 220 cubic yards (170 m^{3}), 325 short tons (295 t) |
| Height: | 222 feet 6 inches (67.82 m) |
| Boom length: | 310 feet (94 m) |
| Machine length (boom down): | 487 feet 6 inches (148.59 m) |
| Bucket weight (empty): | 230 short tons (210 t) |
| Width: | 151 feet 6 inches (46.18 m)—comparable to an eight-lane highway |
| Cable diameter: | 5 inches (130 mm) |
| Electrical power: | 13,800 volts |
| Mobility: | Hydraulically driven walker feet |

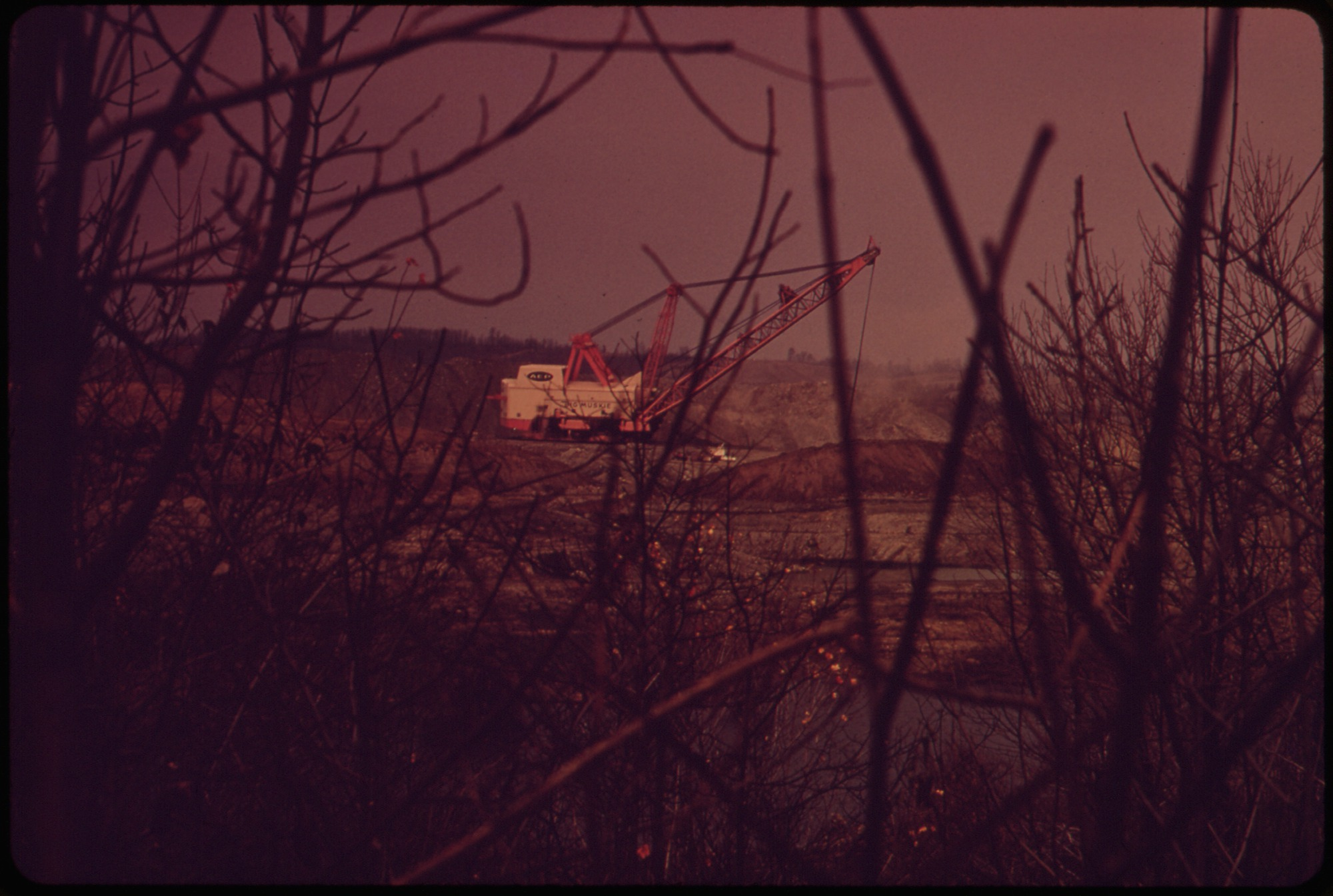
Big Muskie near Freeland, Ohio, October 1973

Big Muskie was powered by electricity supplied at 13,800 volts via a trailing cable, which had its own transporter/coiling units to move it. The electricity powered the main drives: eighteen 1,000-horsepower (746 kW) and ten 625-horsepower (466 kW) DC electric motors. Some systems in Big Muskie were electro-hydraulic, but the main drives were all electric. While working, Big Muskie used the equivalent of the power for 27,500 homes, costing tens of thousands of dollars an hour just in power costs and necessitating special agreements with local Ohio power companies to accommodate the extra load. The machine had a crew of five, and worked around the clock, with special emphasis on night work since the per kilowatt-hour rate was much cheaper.

Once it had stripped all the overburden in one area of the pit, it could move itself short distances (usually less than 1 mile [1.6 km]) to another pre-prepared digging position using massive hydraulic walker feet, although due to its 13,500 short tons (12,200 t) weight it traveled very slowly (1.76 inches per second [4.5 cm/s; 0.1 mph]) and required a carefully graded travelway with a roadbed of heavy wooden beams to avoid sinking into the soil and tipping over or getting stuck.

During its 22 years of service, Big Muskie removed more than 608,000,000 cubic yards (465,000,000 m^{3}) of overburden, twice the amount of earth moved during the construction of the Panama Canal, uncovering over 20,000,000 short tons (18,000,000 t) of Ohio brown coal.

== Retirement and final fate ==
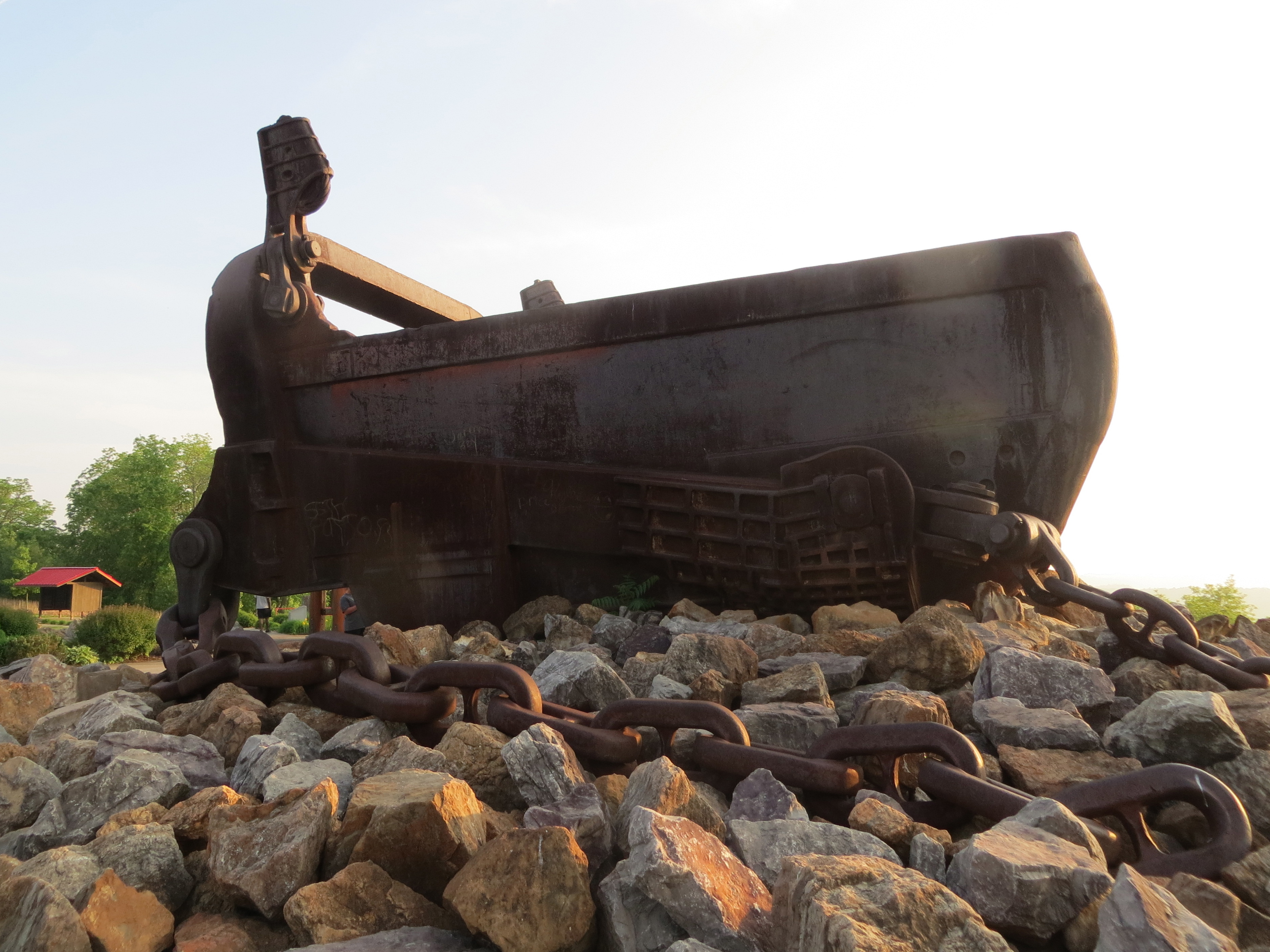
The Big Muskie Bucket (looking south) at Miners' Memorial Park, Bristol, Ohio (about 17 miles west of Caldwell), May 2013

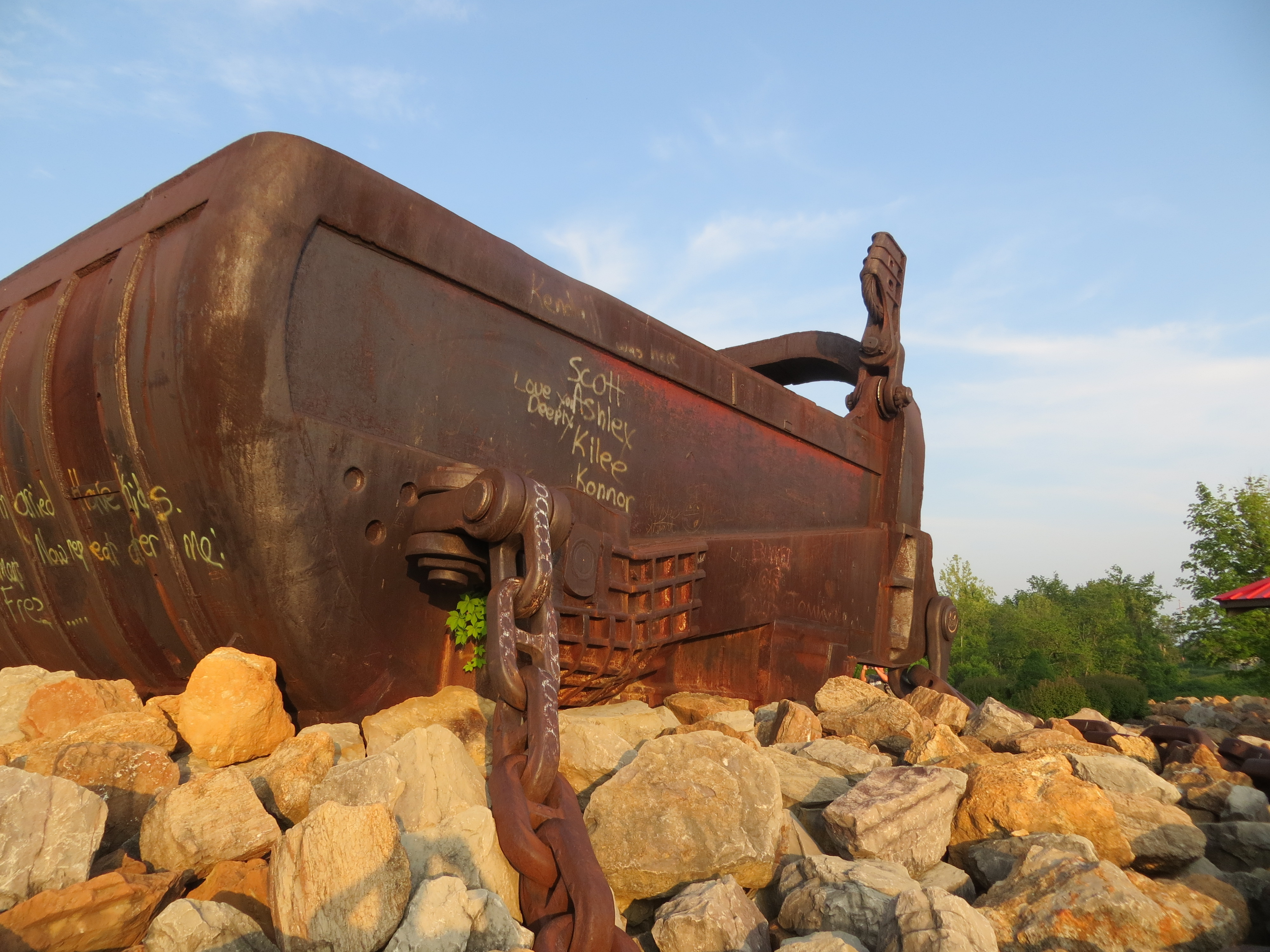
The Big Muskie Bucket (looking northeast), May 2013

Increased EPA scrutiny and a rapid drop in demand for high sulfur coal following the passage of the 1977 Clean Air Act, coupled with regular yearly increases in electricity costs and continued public opposition to strip mining operations in Ohio, eventually made Big Muskie unprofitable to operate, and it was removed from service in 1991. Attempts to sell the machine to another coal company found little interest due to the massive costs involved in dismantling, transporting and reassembling the machine. Additionally, by 1991 the few US coal companies still practicing open-pit mining had transitioned to smaller, newer, and cheaper digging machines with much lower operating costs. The only remaining large-scale open-pit brown coal operations that might have been suitable for Big Muskie's design were located at the Garzweiler mine in Germany, where more efficient giant bucket wheel excavators—the largest of which could remove more than twice the overburden of Big Muskie per day, and with lower power consumption—had long since made giant draglines obsolete.

After sitting inoperative for 8 years, the final act for Big Muskie came in 1999 when the state of Ohio and the Environmental Protection Agency began moving to enforce the Surface Mining Control and Reclamation Act, which required all equipment be removed from former strip mines so the sites could be environmentally remediated. Since further delays would result in millions of dollars in fines, and the cost of moving the obsolete machine would also run well into the millions, the COCC opted for immediate on-site scrapping. Despite several calls from fans, enthusiasts, and historians saying that Big Muskie should have been relocated and made into a museum, in May 1999 the machine was dismantled for $700,000 worth of recycled metal to the Mayer-Pollock Steel Corporation.

The bucket of Big Muskie was moved to an AEP ReCreation Land Park, formerly named in honor of Ronald V. Crews, Mine General Superintendent of Central Ohio Coal Company. The park was renamed to honor all those who mined coal in Southeastern Ohio. The now Miners' Memorial Park not only showcases the bucket of Big Muskie, but includes an information center which shows the history of Central Ohio Coal Company. A memorial honors all the miners who lost their lives while on the job. A Wall of Honor display shows the names of all Central Ohio Coal Company employees. The Memorial, located 9 miles from McConnelsville in Morgan County, is a popular tourist stop.

A wildlife park called The Wilds, which opened in 1994, was created from 10,000 acres (40 km^{2}) of the land stripped by Big Muskie and later reclaimed. It is home to numerous species of African, Asian, and North American fauna.

== See also ==
- Dragline excavator
- MAN Takraf RB293
- Marion 6360 – another giant power shovel
- The Silver Spade – another large coal mining machine from Ohio
