= GEM of Egypt =

Power shovel for strip mining

1950-B "GEM of Egypt"
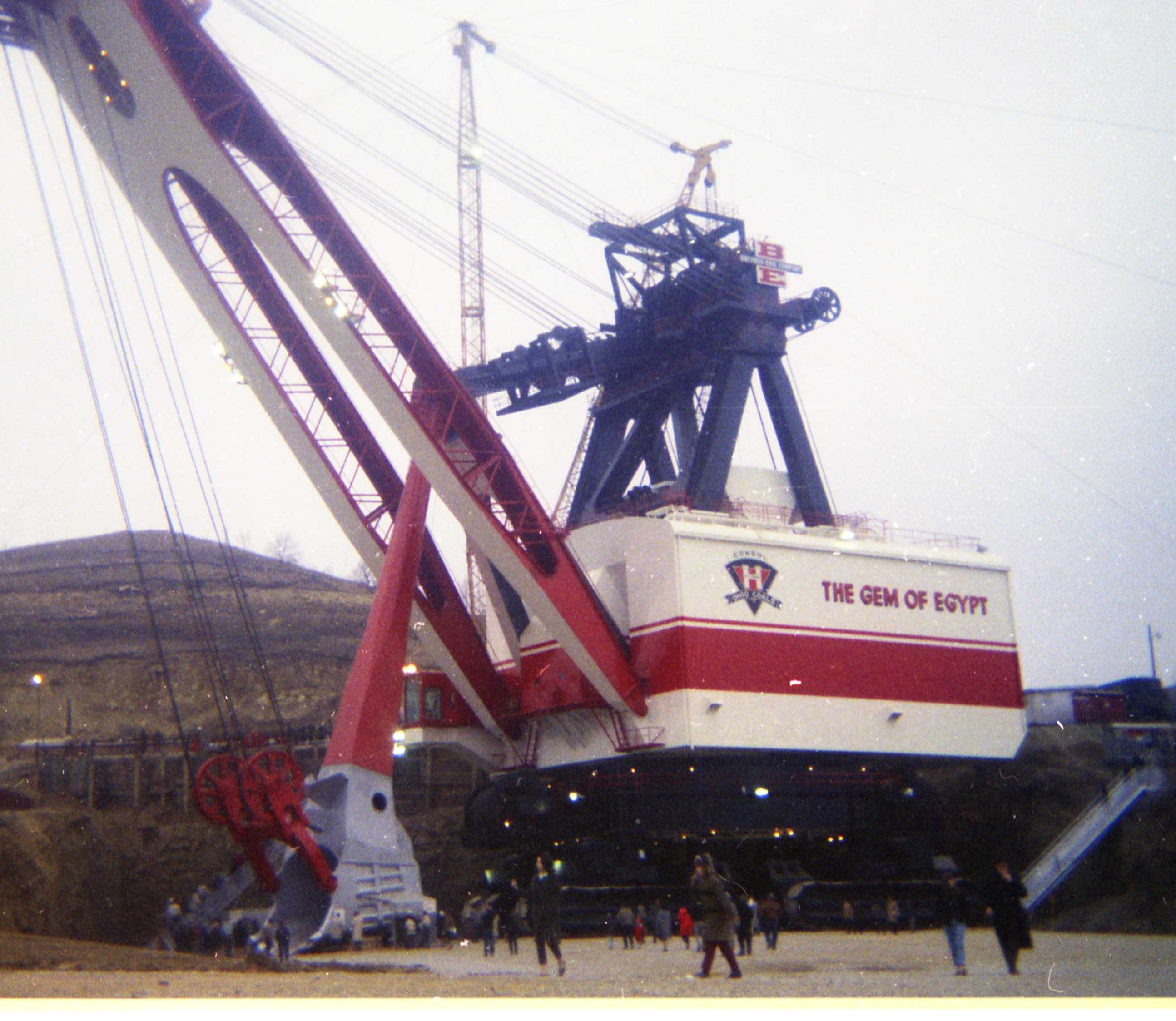
- GEM of Egypt
- Type: Electric power shovel
- Manufacturer: Bucyrus-Erie
- Production: 1967
- Length: 70 m (229 ft)
- Width: 18 m (59 ft)
- Height: 67 m (220 ft)
- Weight: 7,000 t (15,400,000 lb)
- Propulsion: 8 x caterpillar tracks
- Gross power: 13,500 hp or 10.1 megawatts
- Speed: 0.25 mph or 0.4 km/h
- Blade capacity: 130 cubic yards (99.4 m^{3}) or 35.1 short tons (31.8 t)

The GEM of Egypt was a power shovel built by Bucyrus-Erie in 1966. The shovel was designed for strip mining at the Egypt Valley coalfield near Barnesville, Ohio. GEM is an acronym for “Giant Earth Mover” or “Giant Excavating Machine”. It was one of only two Bucyrus-Erie 1950-B shovels built (the other being The Silver Spade) and one of two to use the knee-action crowd licensed from Marion Power Shovel in exchange for Marion's use of Bucyrus-Erie's cable crowd patent.

In a power shovel, "crowding" is pushing the bucket at the end of a "handle" ("dipper" or "dipper stick") in or out to control the depth of cut or to position for dumping. With knee action, the handle is connected to a moveable pivot point rather than being supported directly by the boom. Knee-action design made possible the largest shovel ever built, increased digging power, allowed the bucket to move horizontally into the cut and improved swing efficiency, distance, and radius.

== Operational history ==
The GEM of Egypt had a 170' boom and a 130 cubic yard bucket which enabled it to dig roughly 200 tons per 'bite'. The machine began work in January, 1967 for Hanna Coal, and was later purchased by Consolidated Coal in "Egypt Valley" near Barnesville, Ohio. The area was also where the GEM got its name. The GEM was one of four in the service of the Hanna Coal Company, which by 1970, had been strip mining in Ohio for decades, joined by The Tiger and The Mountaineer.

Of the four, the GEM of Egypt had the largest bucket, and went into service upon the official opening of the Egypt Valley mine in January 1967. It was reported that an estimated 25,000 people traveled to the site, many from Ohio cities such as Cleveland, Akron, and Canton, as well as those from neighboring states. The shovel was 20 stories tall and weighed 6,850 tons. Production there was expected to average 20,000 tons a day, which the company forecast would last for the next 30 to 40 years until the vein ran out.

The GEM was parked in 1988 and finally dismantled in 1991 off Ohio SR9 between New Athens and Fairpoint. Parts of the shovel were used to keep its twin, The Silver Spade, operating until it too was retired.

== Gallery ==
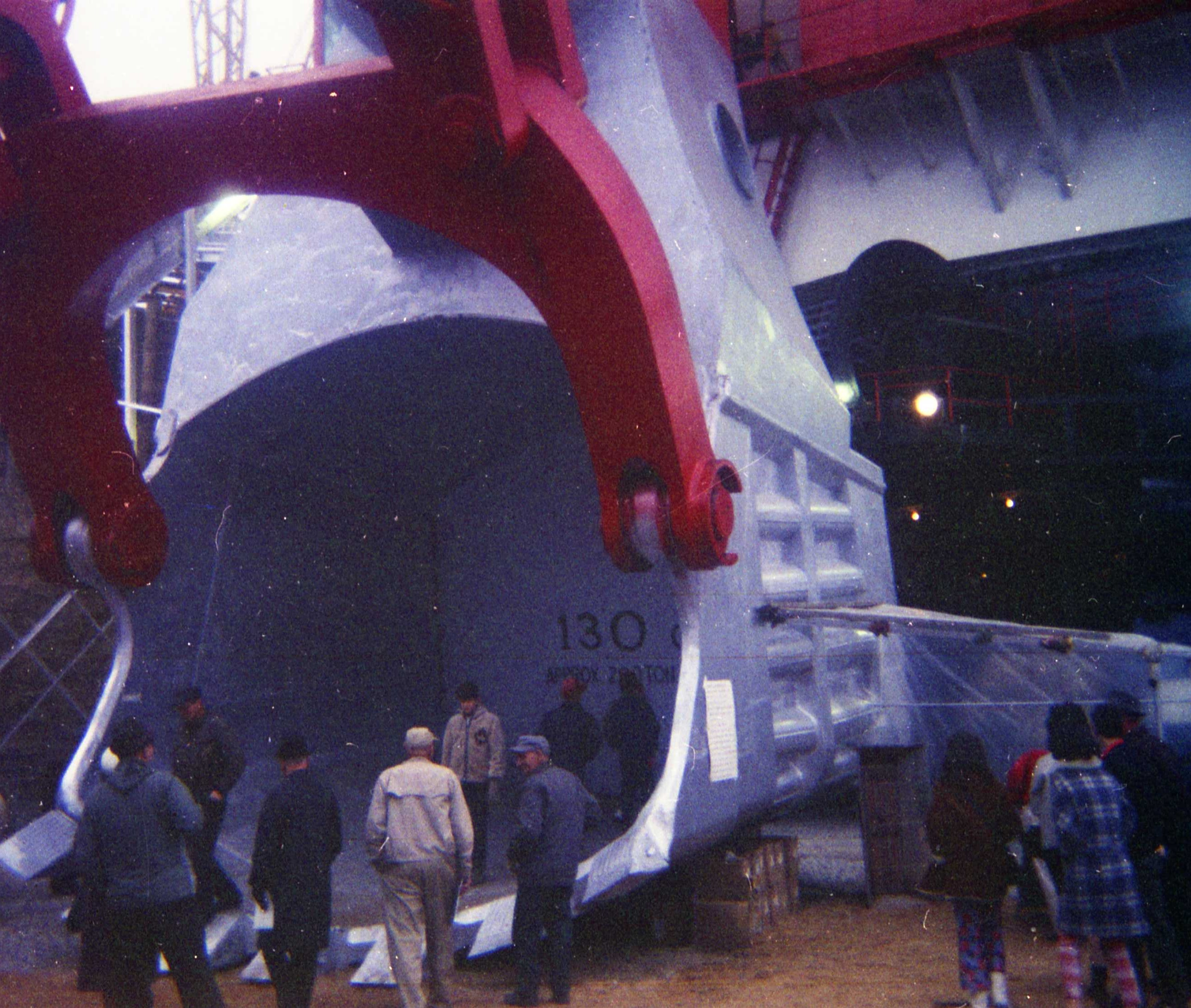
View Inside the Shovel

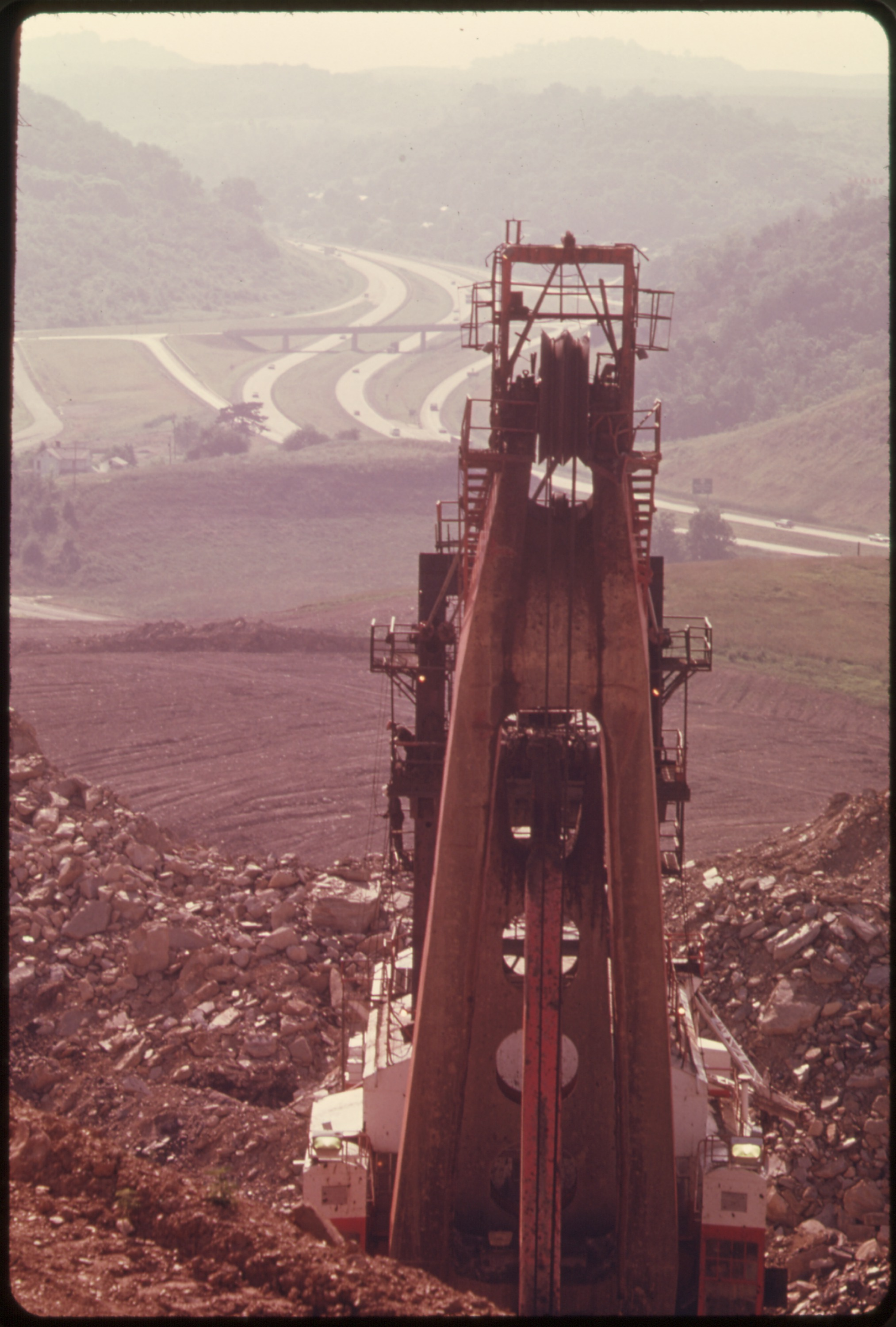
The Tiger, which worked alongside the GEM in July, 1974 over I-70 near Morristown, Ohio.
