= Power shovel =

Bucket-equipped machine used for digging and loading earth

Principle of rope-shovel operation

A power shovel, also known as a motor shovel, stripping shovel, front shovel, mining shovel or rope shovel, is a bucket-equipped machine usually powered by steam, diesel fuel, gasoline or electricity and used for digging and loading earth or fragmented rock and for mineral extraction. Power shovels are a type of rope/cable excavator, where the digging arm is controlled and powered by winches and steel ropes, rather than hydraulics like in the modern hydraulic excavators. Basic parts of a power shovel include the track system, cabin, cables, rack, stick, boom foot-pin, saddle block, boom, boom point sheaves and bucket.

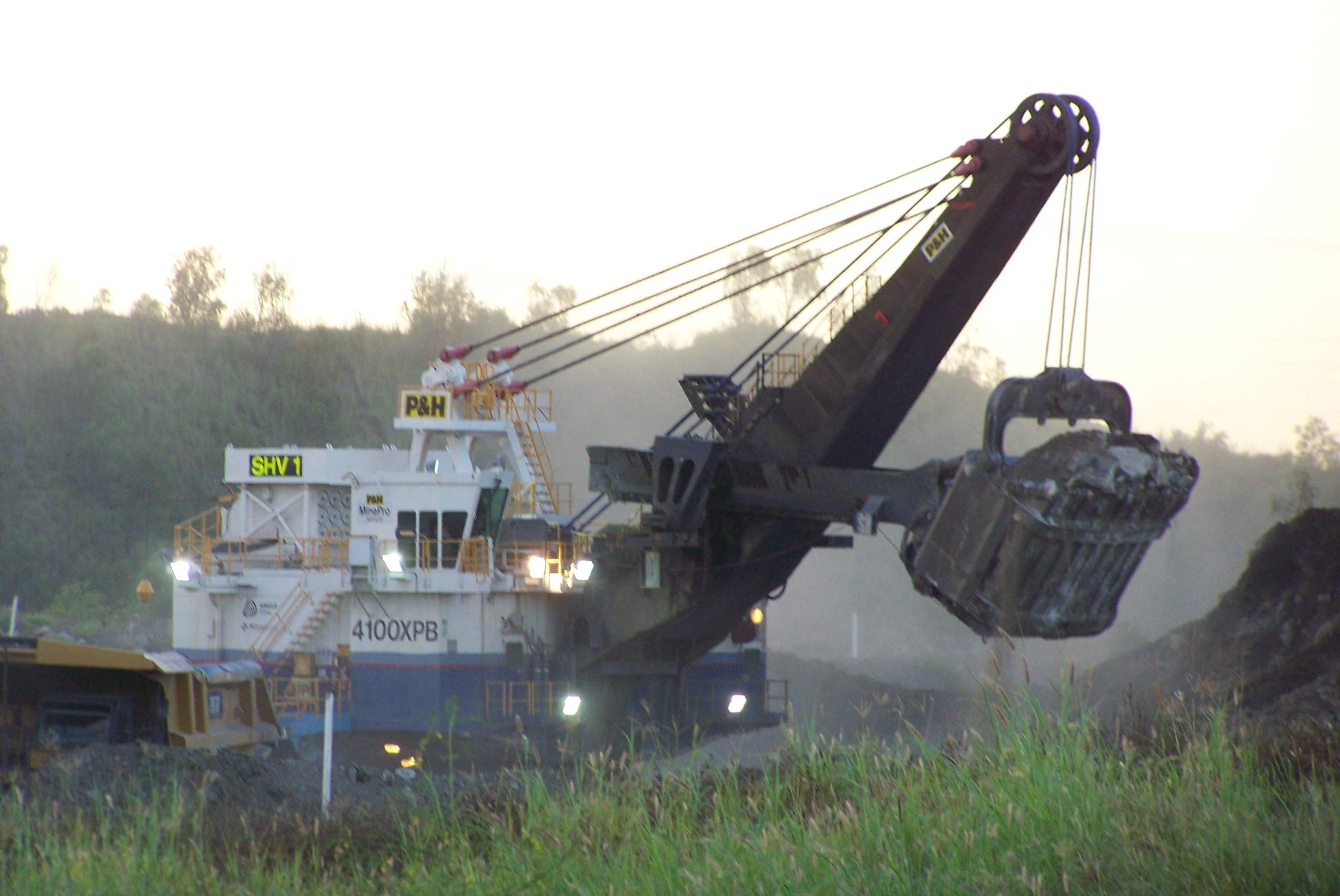
P&H 4100 XPB cable loading shovel

== Design ==
Power shovels normally consist of a revolving deck with a power plant, drive and control mechanisms, usually a counterweight, and a front attachment, such as a crane ("boom") which supports a handle ("dipper" or "dipper stick") with a digger ("bucket") at the end. The term "dipper" is also sometimes used to refer to the handle and digger combined. The machinery is mounted on a base platform with tracks or wheels. Modern bucket capacities range from 8m^{3} to more than 80m^{3}.

== Use ==
Power shovels are used principally for excavation and removal of overburden in open-cut mining operations; they may also be used for the loading of minerals, such as coal. They are the classic equivalent of excavators, and operate in a similar fashion.

Other uses of the power shovel include:

1. Close range work.
2. Digging very hard materials.
3. Removing large boulders.
4. Excavating material and loading trucks.
5. Various other types of jobs such as digging in gravel banks, in clay pits, cuts in support of road work, road-side berms, etc.

== Operation ==
The shovel operates using several main motions including:

- Hoisting - Pulling the bucket up through the bank of material being dug.
- Crowding - Moving the dipper handle in or out in order to control the depth of cut or to position for dumping.
- Swinging - Rotating the shovel between the dig site and dumping location.
- Propelling - Moving the shovel unit to different locations or dig positions.

A shovel's work cycle, or digging cycle, consists of four phases:

- 1 Digging
- 2 Swinging
- 3 Dumping
- 4 Returning

The digging phase consists of crowding the dipper into the bank, hoisting the dipper to fill it, then retracting the full dipper from the bank. The swinging phase occurs once the dipper is clear of the bank both vertically and horizontally. The operator controls the dipper through a planned swing path and dump height until it is suitably positioned over the haul unit (e.g. truck). Dumping involves opening the dipper door to dump the load, while maintaining the correct dump height. Returning is when the dipper swings back to the bank, and involves lowering the dipper into the track position to close the dipper door.

== Giant stripping shovels ==
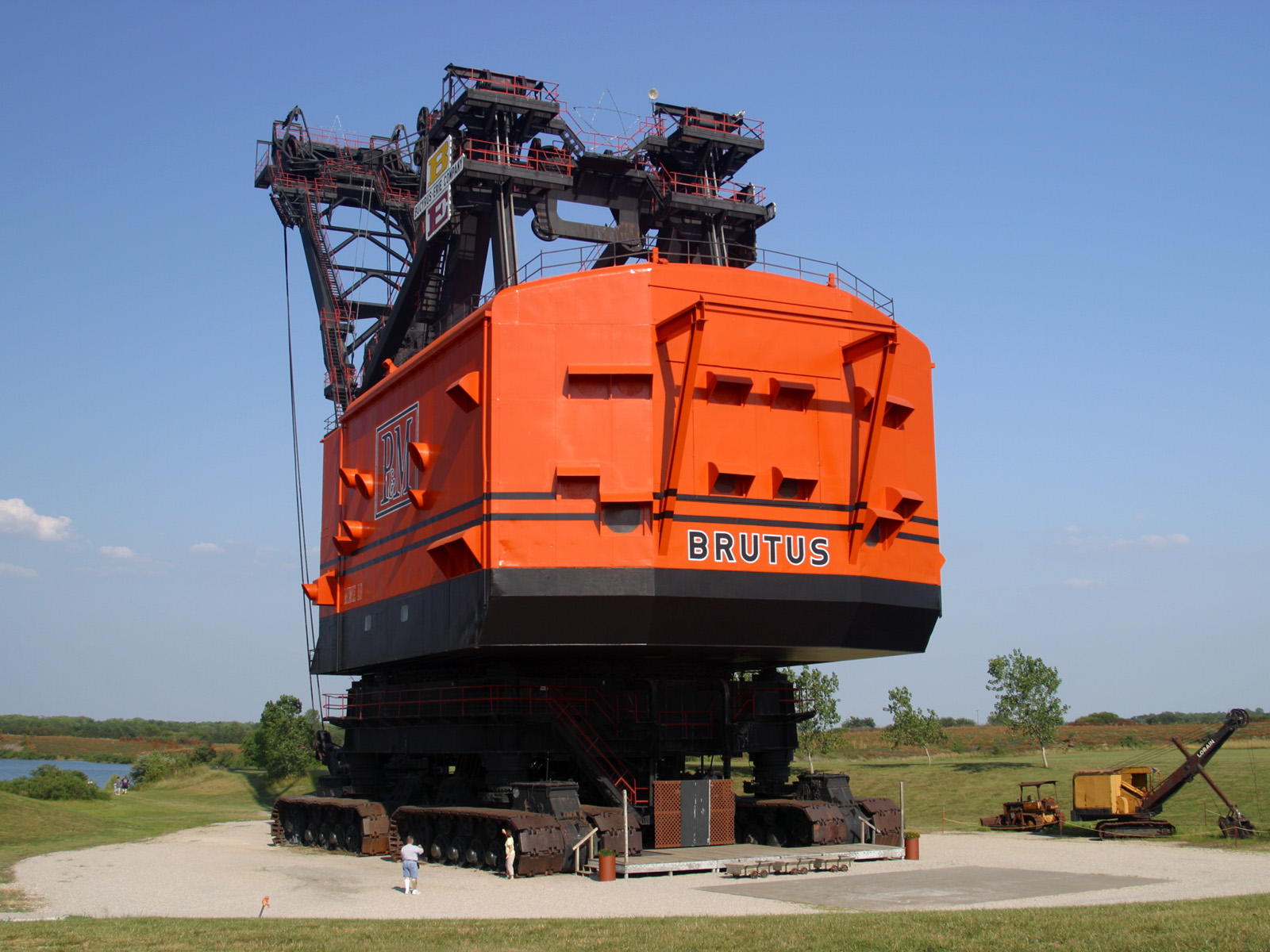
Big Brutus, which is now preserved as a museum

In the 1950s with the demand for coal at a peak high and more coal companies turning to the cheaper method of strip mining, excavator manufacturers started offering a new super class of power shovels, commonly called giant stripping shovels. Most were built between the 1950s and the 1970s. The world's first giant stripping shovel for the coal fields was the Marion 5760. Unofficially known to its crew and eastern Ohio residents alike as The Mountaineer, it was erected in 1955/56 near Cadiz, Ohio off of Interstate I-70. Larger models followed the successful 5760, culminating in the mid-60s with the gigantic 12,700-ton Marion 6360, nicknamed The Captain. One stripping shovel, The 4,220-ton Bucyrus-Erie 1850-B known as "Big Brutus" has been preserved as a national landmark and a museum with tours and camping. Another stripping shovel, the Bucyrus-Erie 3850-B (known as "Big Hog") was eventually cut down in 1985 and buried on the Peabody Sinclair Surface Mining site near the Paradise Mining Plant, where it was operated. It remains there, on non-public, government-owned land.

=== Notable examples ===
Ranked by bucket capacity.

| Ranking | Bucket Capacity (m^{3}/yd^{3}) | Operating weight (tons) | Type | Name | Service | Dismantled |
|---|---|---|---|---|---|---|
| 1 | 138/180 | 12,700 | Marion 6360 | The Captain | 1965 | 1992 (Burned in Internal Fire) |
| 2 | 107/140 | 9,350 | Bucyrus-Erie 3850-B | The River Queen | 1964 | 1993 |
| 3 | 99/130 | 6,850 | Bucyrus-Erie 1950-B | The GEM of Egypt | 1967 | 1991 |
| 4 | 96/125 | 9,338 | Marion 5960-M | Big Digger | 1969 | 1990 |
| 5 | 88/115 | 6,950 | Bucyrus Erie 3850-B | Big Hog | 1962 | 1985 (Buried On Site) |
| 6 | 80/105 | 7,200 | Bucyrus-Erie 1950-B | The Silver Spade | 1965 | 2007 (Preservation Attempts Failed) |
| 7 | 69/90 | 4,220 | Bucyrus-Erie 1850-B | Big Brutus | 1962 | Preserved as a National Landmark |
| 8 | 50/65 | 2,750 | Marion 5760-B | The Mountaineer | 1956 | 1988 |

== See also ==
- P&H Mining
- Bucyrus International
- Dragline
- Excavator
- Marion Power Shovel
- Steam shovel
- Hulett
