= Overburden =

Material that lies above the resource to be mined

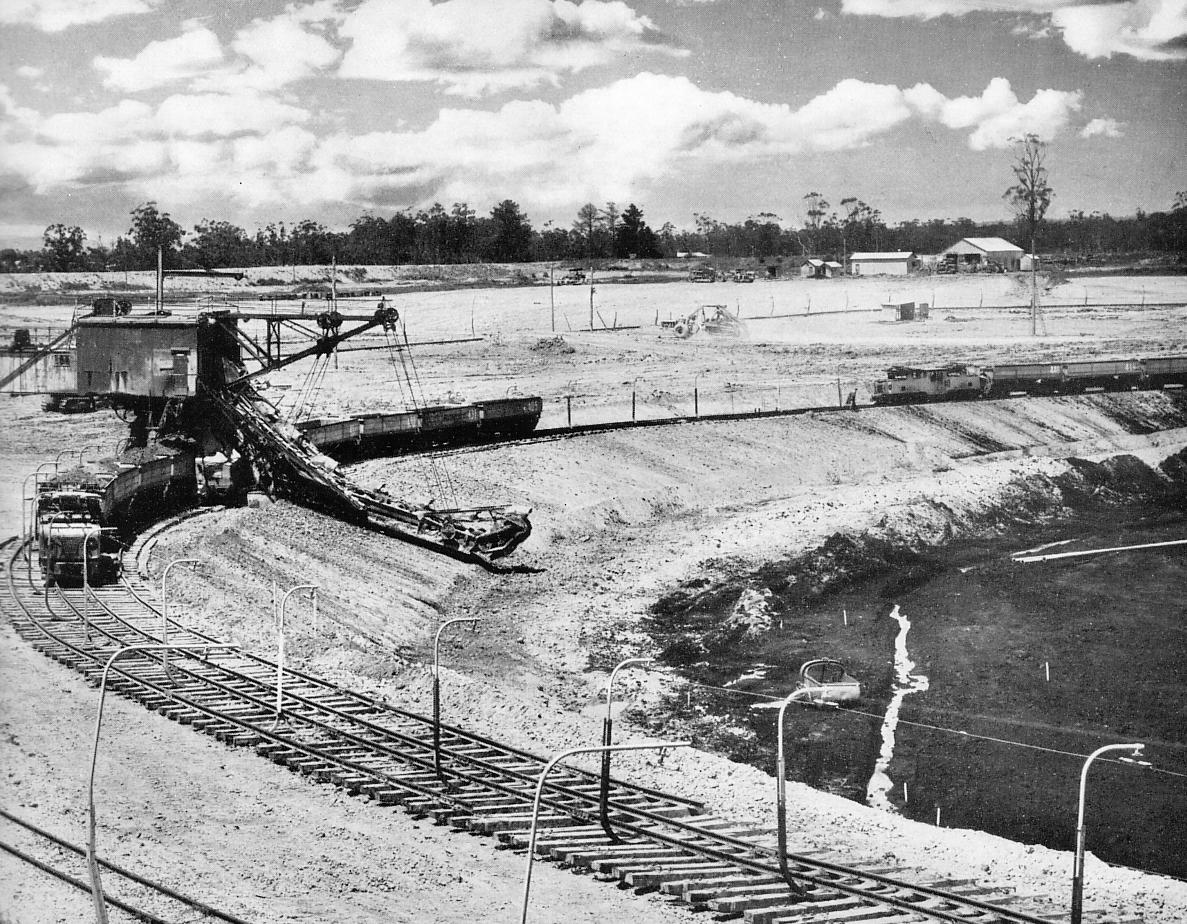
Overburden at a coal mining site

In mining, overburden (also called waste or spoil) is the material that lies above an area that lends itself to economical exploitation, such as the rock, soil, and ecosystem that lies above a coal seam or ore body. Overburden is distinct from tailings, the material that remains after economically valuable components have been extracted from the generally finely milled ore. Overburden is removed during surface mining, but is typically not contaminated with toxic components. Overburden may also be used to restore an exhausted mining site during reclamation. In some cases overburden can leach toxic materials into the environment.

Interburden is material that lies between two areas of economic interest, such as the material separating coal seams within strata.

== Analogous uses ==
Overburden is also used for all soil and ancillary material above the bedrock horizon in a given area.

By analogy, overburden is also used to describe the soil and other material that lies above a specific geologic feature, such as a buried astrobleme, or above an unexcavated site of archaeological interest.

In particle physics, the overburden of an underground laboratory may be important to shield the facility from cosmic radiation that can interfere with experiments.

In arboriculture, the word is also used for the soil over the top of the roots of a tree collected from the wild.

== See also ==
- Gangue
- Spoil tip
