= Rutland Railway Museum =

Coordinates: 52.7143°N 0.6890°W

Rocks by Rail: The Living Ironstone Museum
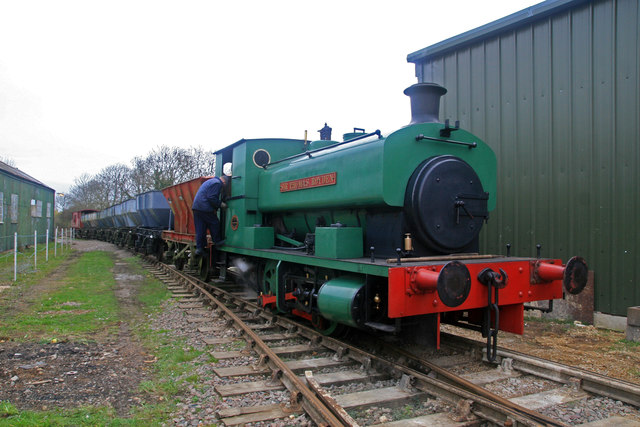
- Andrew Barclay "Sir Thomas Royden" with a train of mineral wagons.
- Location: Cottesmore, Oakham, Rutland
- Type: Railway museum
- Website: https://www.rocks-by-rail.org/

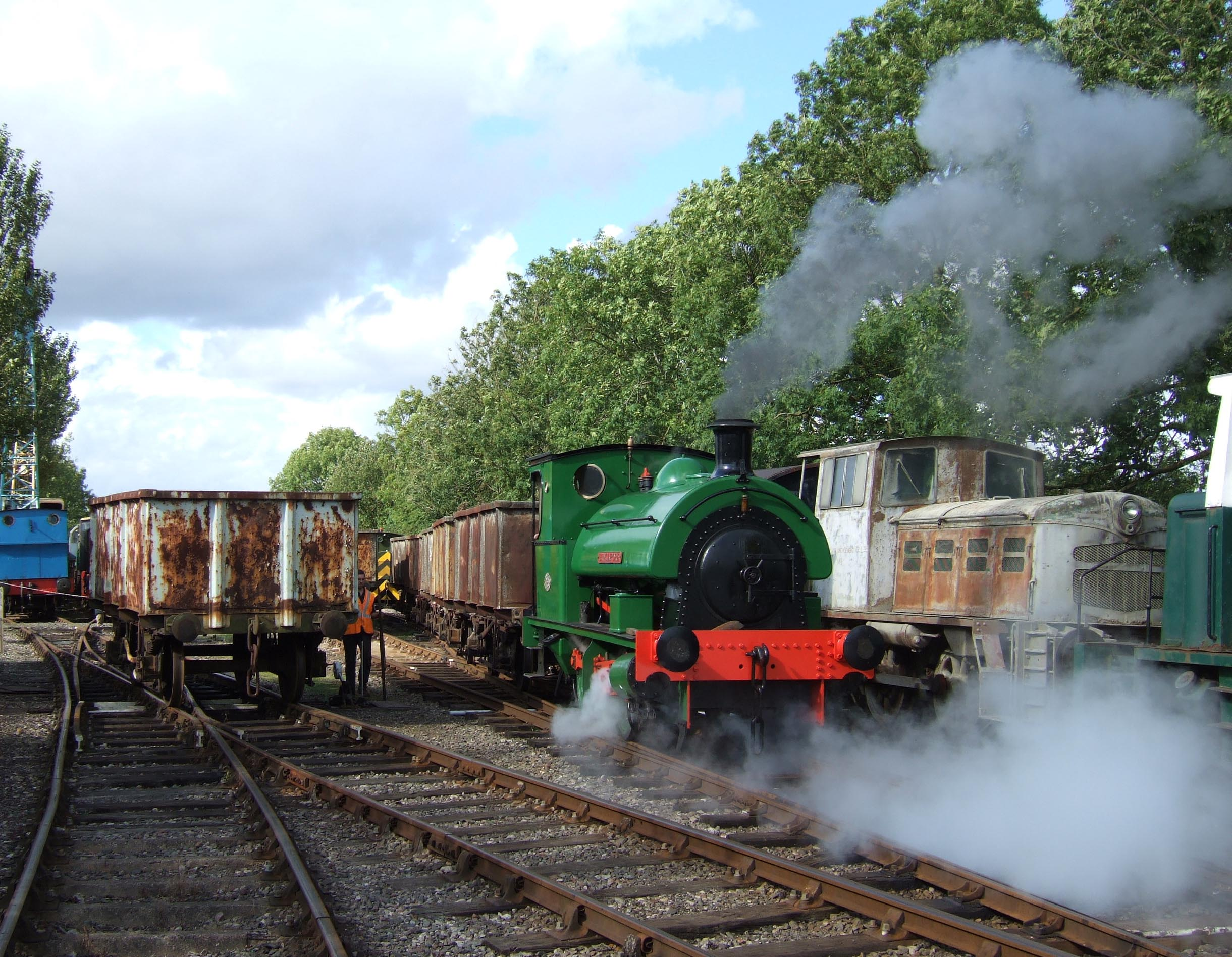
Hawthorn Leslie "Singapore" hauling a train of mineral wagons

Rutland Railway Museum, now trading as Rocks by Rail: The Living Ironstone Museum, is a heritage railway on part of a former Midland Railway mineral branch line. It is situated north east of Oakham, in Rutland, England.

== Overview ==
The museum offers an open-air site dedicated to recreating an ironstone tramway system in its entirety from the extraction of iron ore from a 'first cut' quarry face reproduced in the quarry viewing area to the exchange sidings with the BR rail head. The museum aims to preserve and operate industrial locomotives and mineral wagons from local quarry railways as well as artefacts related to quarry railways in general.

The museum site is based on a typical 1950s or early 1960s quarry system when both steam and diesel power was evident in the industry. The branch line linked to the Melton Mowbray to Oakham main line at Ashwell Signal Box. Exchange sidings were once located at the museum serving three separate private quarry railway systems associated with the past extraction of iron ore. The museum site was known locally as Cottesmore Iron Ore Mines Sidings.

The concrete tipping dock built for Cottesmore quarries has been conserved, along with the locomotive running shed from Woolsthorpe Quarries on the Lincs/Leics border, in its entirety. Also preserved are several items of quarry machinery including a 22RB Ruston-Bucyrus face shovel, a 22RB Ruston-Bucyrus dragline excavator and a Euclid dump truck as used in local quarry systems. The cab of the massive Ransomes & Rapier dragline excavator Sundew is on display along with a cab from 110RB Ruston-Bucyrus dragline from the Barrington Cement Works quarry railway.

Also present at the museum is the Simon Layfield Exhibition Centre which comprises three roads of locomotive/wagon exhibits and related displays concerning former local quarry railways.

Also on display at the museum is Hawthorn Leslie locomotive "SINGAPORE" works number 3865 built in 1936. This locomotive was exported to Singapore Royal Navy Dockyard and was captured in February 1942 by the Japanese during World War II. The locomotive features superficial bullet and shrapnel damage sustained during air raids on the dockyard from Japanese aircraft. The locomotive HL3865/36 "SINGAPORE" is an honorary member of the FEPOW organisation and a registered War Memorial.

The museum operates passenger rides on a 0.75 miles (1.21 km) length of track and occupies an area of nearly 9 acres (28,000 m^{2}). Passenger rides are provided in restored brake vans, typical of those formerly used in freight trains in the area. The museum welcomes any related donations of artefacts or information which may help further its aims.

== Locomotives ==
=== Steam locomotives ===
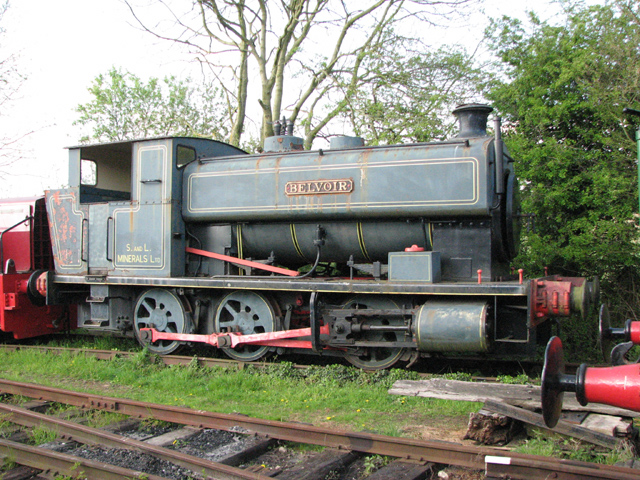
Andrew Barclay "Belvoir"

- Hawthorn Leslie 0-4-0ST works No. 3865 "SINGAPORE" built in 1936. On display, subject of a fund-raising appeal for an overhaul to working condition. Ex HM Dockyards Singapore, Ex HM Dockyards Chatham
- Andrew Barclay 0-4-0ST works No. 1931 built in 1927. Operational. Ex British Sugar BSC, Wissington, Norfolk
- Andrew Barclay 0-4-0ST works No. 2088 "SIR THOMAS ROYDEN" built in 1940. On display. Ex CEGB, Stourport
- Andrew Barclay 0-6-0ST outside cylinder works No. 2350 "BELVOIR" built in 1954. On display. Ex Woolsthorpe quarries, Lincs.
- Avonside 0-6-0ST works No. 1972 "STAMFORD" built in 1927. On display awaiting restoration. Ex Pilton quarries, Rutland
- Peckett & Sons 0-4-0ST works No. 1257 "UPPINGHAM" built in 1912. On display awaiting restoration. Ex James Pain ironstone quarries
- W.G. Bagnall 0-6-0ST outside cylinder works No. 2668 "CRANFORD No. 2" built in 1942. On display. Ex Cranford, Northamptonshire.
- Yorkshire Engine Company 0-6-0ST No. 2521 built in 1952. On display. Ex Appleby Frodingham "Ore Mining Branch" Scunthorpe
- Peckett & Sons 0-4-0ST works No. 1759 "ELIZABETH" built in 1928. Undergoing comprehensive overhaul. Ex Mountsorrel quarries, Leics.
- Hudswell Clarke 0-6-0ST No. 1308 "RHOS" built in 1918. Dismantled, awaiting restoration. Ex Stewarts & Lloyds Corby quarries

=== Diesel locomotives ===
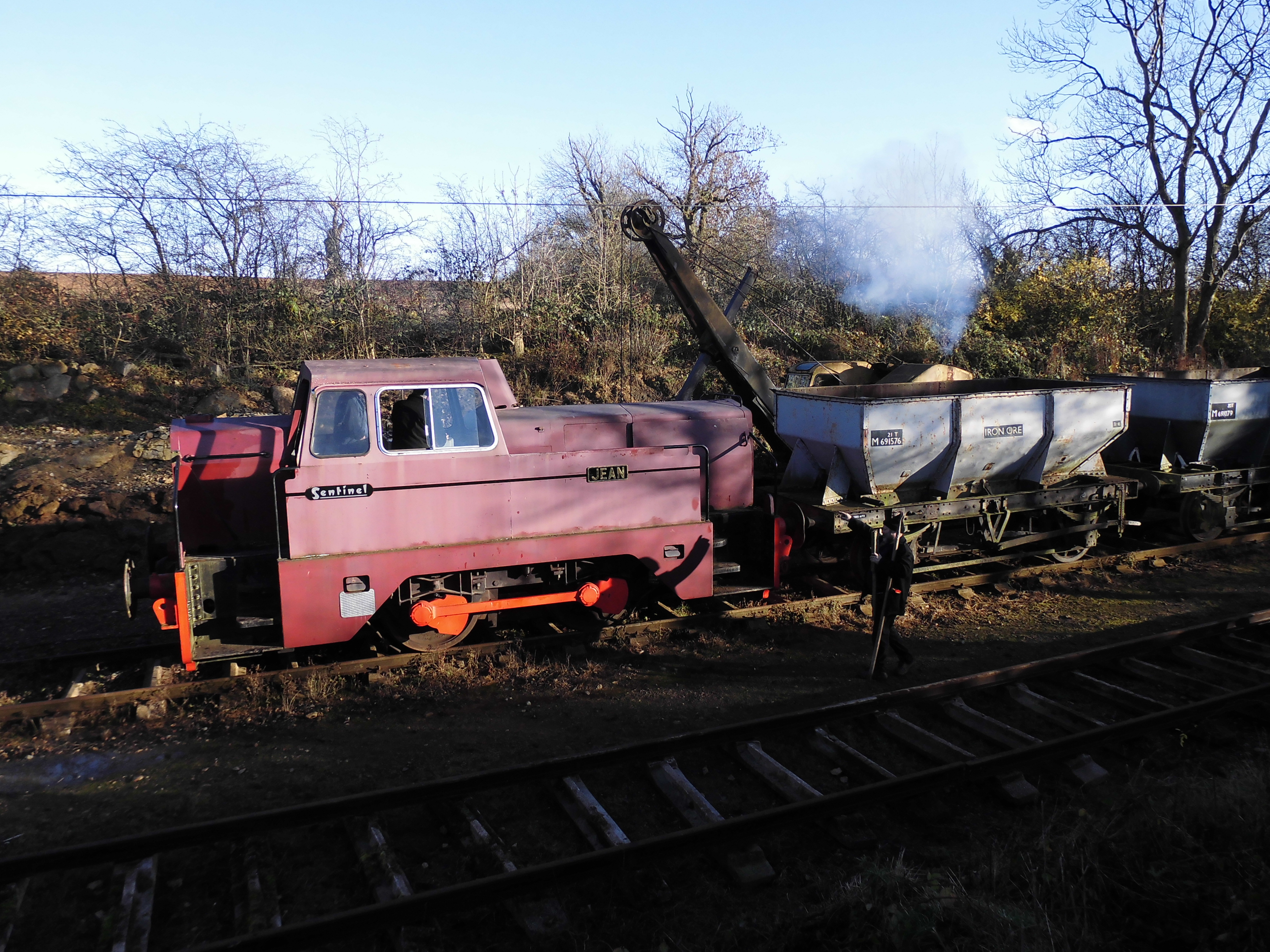
Sentinel "Jean" with a hopper wagon train

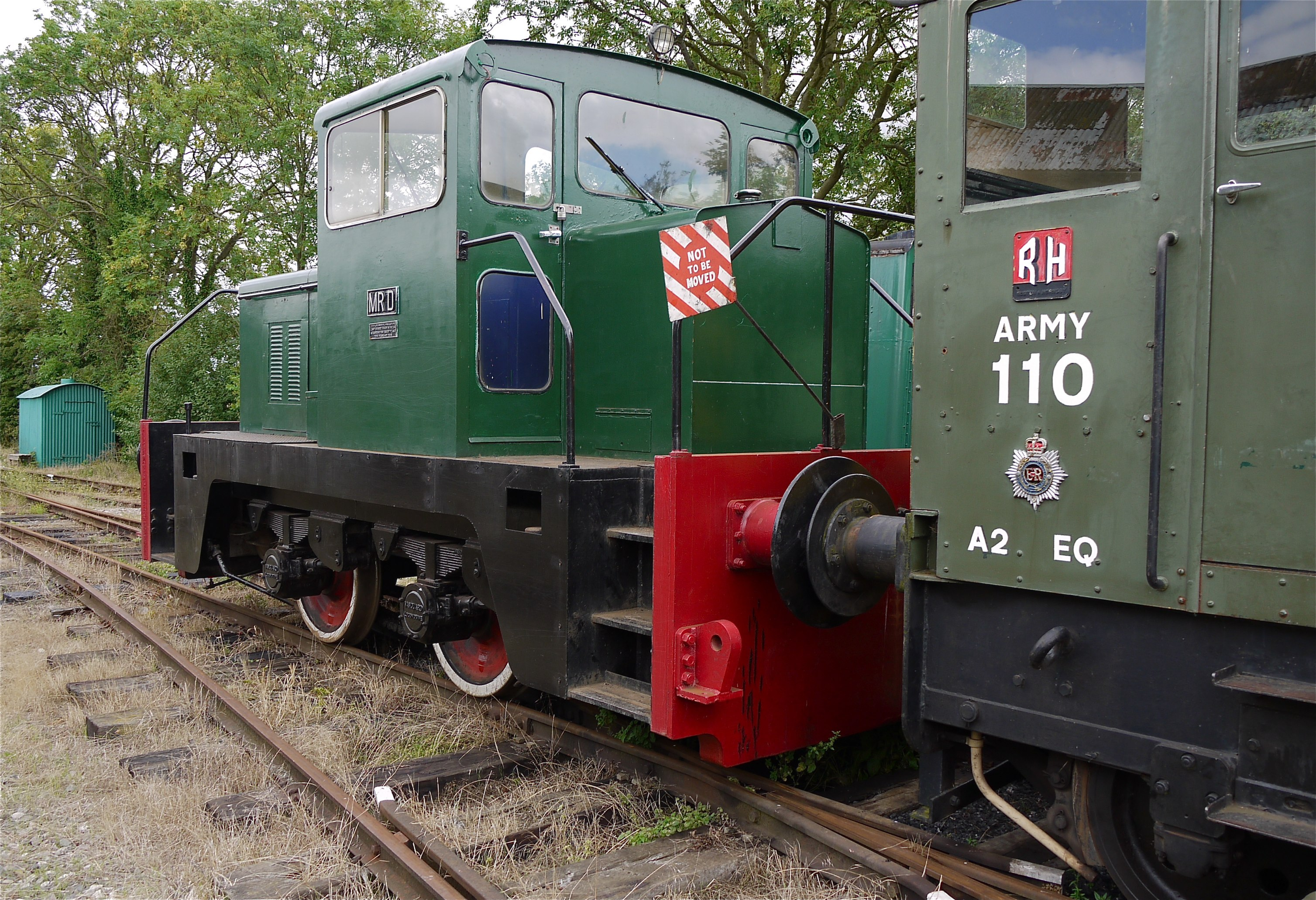
Thomas Hill "Mr D"

- Yorkshire Engine Company Janus class 0-6-0DE works No. 2791 "DE5" built in 1962. On display. Ex Exton Park Ironstone Quarries, Rutland & BSC, Scunthorpe.
- Yorkshire Engine Company 0-6-0DE works No. 2872 1382 built in 1962. Operational. Ex Colsterworth Quarries and Easton Mines.
- Rolls-Royce Ltd 0-4-0DH works No. 10201 "BETTY" built in 1964. Operational. Ex Oxfordshire Ironstone, Banbury
- Rolls-Royce Ltd 0-4-0DH works No. 10204 "JEAN" built in 1965. Operational. Ex Oxfordshire Ironstone, Banbury
- Rolls-Royce Ltd 0-4-0DH works No. 10207 "GRAHAM" built in 1965. Operational. Ex Oxfordshire Ironstone, Banbury
- John Fowler & Co. 0-4-0DH works No. 4220007 "KETTON No. 1" built in 1960. Undergoing restoration. Ex Ketton Cement Works.
- Ruston Class 165DE 0-4-0DH works No. 421436 "ELIZABETH" built in 1958. On display. Ex Rugby Cement, Barrington.
- Thomas Hill 4wDH works no. 186V "Mr D" built in 1967. Under repair. Ex Rugby Cement, Barrington.
- Thomas Hill 4wDH works no. 178V No. 8 built in 1967. On display. Ex Rugby Cement, Barrington.
- Ruston Class 48DS 4wDM works No. 207103 built in 1941. Operational. Ex British Benzol at Bedwas Coke Ovens.
- Ruston Class 88DS 4wDM works No. 306092 built in 1950. On display. Ex British Electricity Authority Bidder Street Power station, Canning Town, London.
- Ruston Class LPSE 0-4-0DE works No. 544997 "ERIC TONKS" built in 1969. On display. Ex Hays Chemicals, Sandbach, Cheshire.

=== Wagons ===
The museum has a selection of typical quarry wagons which are used for demonstrations on open days. Details are below. The list is not exhaustive.

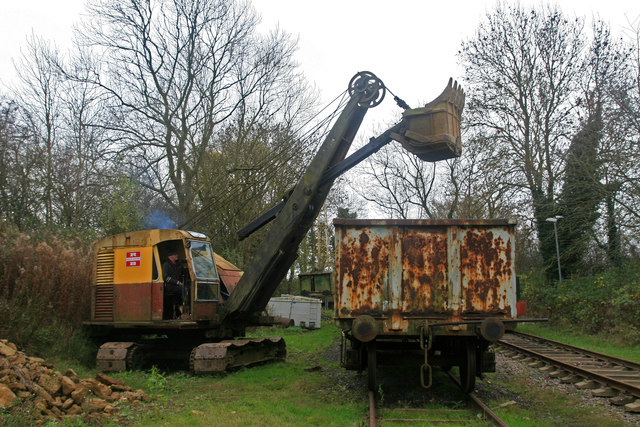
The Ruston Bucyrus 22RB face shovel does some quarry demonstrations with the Iron Ore Tippler rake.

- Iron Ore Tippler rake

Numerous wagons from this list are available for use and can be seen in operation.

  - British Steel Corporation Iron Ore Tippler Wagon 25197. Purchased from BR by British Steel Corporation.
  - BR Iron Ore Tippler Wagon B383560. Built in 1954.
  - BR Iron Ore Tippler Wagon B384428. Built in 1955.
  - BR Iron Ore Tippler Wagon B384768. Built in 1955.
  - BR Iron Ore Tippler Wagon B385005. Built in 1955.
  - BR Iron Ore Tippler Wagon B385997. Built in 1958.
  - BR Iron Ore Tippler Wagon B387245. Built in 1960.
  - BR Iron Ore Tippler Wagon B387643. Built in 1960.
  - BR Iron Ore Tippler Wagon B388815. Built in 1961.
- Hopper Wagon rake

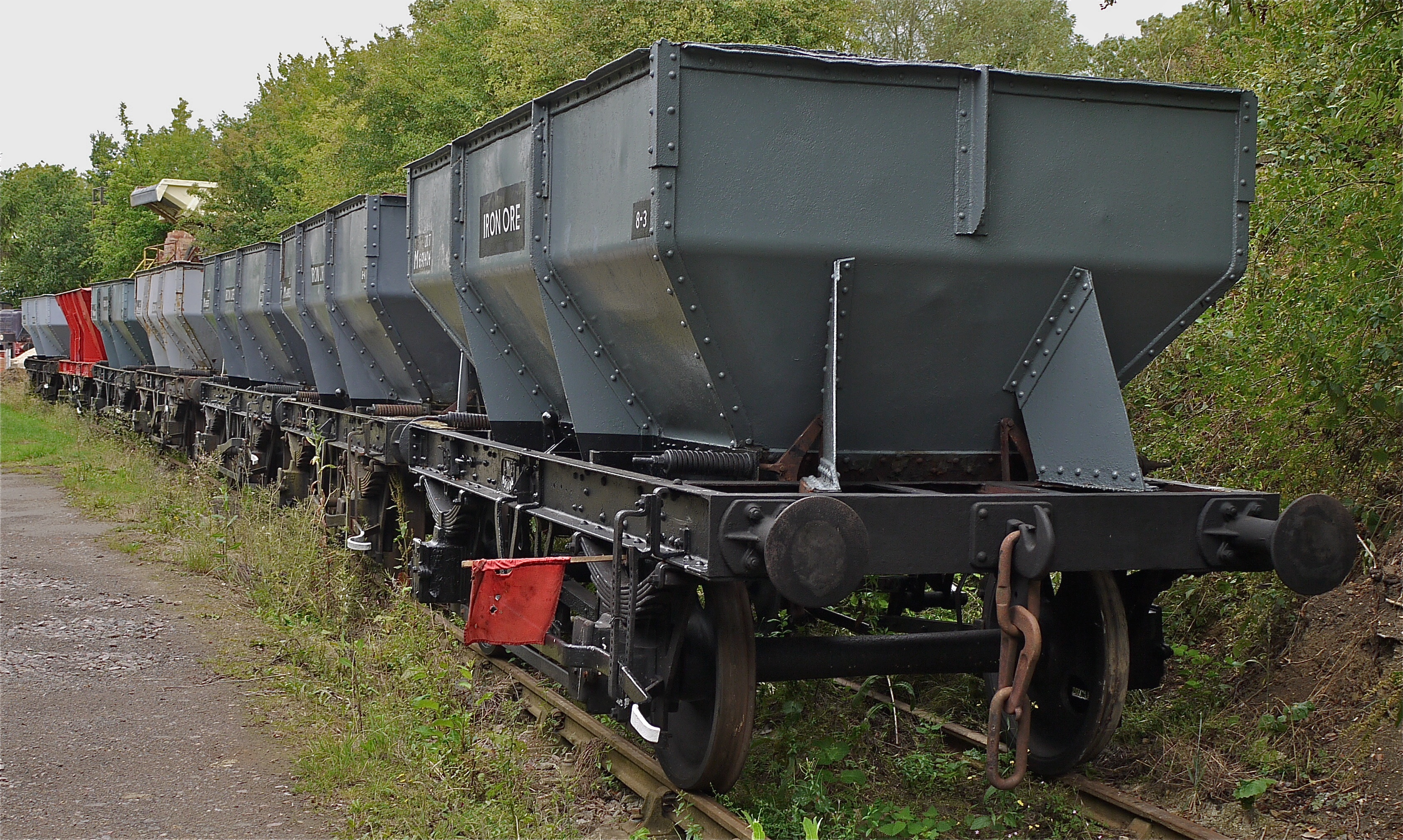
The Hopper Wagon Train

Numerous wagons from this list are available for use and can be seen in operation.

  - Appleby-Frodingham 21 ton peak-ended Iron Ore Hopper Wagon P210000. Built by Central Wagon, 1938.
  - Sheepbridge Iron and Steel Co. Hopper Wagon 101011. Built by Charles Roberts, 1926. Last surviving example.
  - BR Iron Ore Hopper Wagon B436275. Built in 1950 by Charles Roberts. Last surviving example.
  - LMS Iron Ore Hopper Wagon M690379. Built in 1935.
  - LMS Iron Ore Hopper Wagon M691079. Built in 1938.
  - LMS Iron Ore Hopper Wagon M691193. Built in 1938.
  - LMS Iron Ore Hopper Wagon M691404. Built in 1938.
  - LMS Iron Ore Hopper Wagon M691535. Built in 1938.
  - LMS Iron Ore Hopper Wagon M691576. Built in 1938.
  - LMS Iron Ore Hopper Wagon M691793. Built in 1939.
  - LMS Iron Ore Hopper Wagon M691804. Built in 1936.
  - Private Owner Steel Mineral Hopper Wagon P15675. Built 1915 for Liverpool Corporation Electricity Supply by Cammell Laird, Nottingham.
- Ironstone Dump car wagons (last surviving examples)
  - No. 144 (8555/50/72) Built by Metro-Cammell in 1940. Ex-Gretton Brook, Corby.
  - No.125 (8555/50/53) Built by Metro-Cammell in 1940. Ex-Gretton Brook, Corby.
  - No.148 (8555/50/76) Built by Metro-Cammell in 1940. Ex-Gretton Brook, Corby.
  - No. 141 (8555/50/69) Built by Metro-Cammell in 1940. Ex-Gretton Brook, Corby.
  - No.97 (8555/50/25) Built by Birmingham C&W Co. in 1939. Ex-Gretton Brook, Corby.
  - No.76 (8555/50/4) Built by Birmingham C&W Co. in 1939. Ex-Gretton Brook, Corby.
- Chalk Tippler wagons
  - Four Ex-Barrington Cement works tipplers, three rebuilt on 26ton iron ore tippler chassis and one original from the original Eastwoods fleet.
- Brake Vans

The brake vans are used both in the passenger and goods trains.

  - LMS 12 ft Goods Brake Van M286341. Built in 1926.
  - LMS 16 ft Goods Brake Van 731874. Built in 1944.
  - WD 16 ft Brake Van 49006. Built in 1941. Built to Southern Region design.
  - BR Shark Ballast Plough Brake Van DB993734. Built in 1953.
