= Edward Waller Stoney =

Irish engineer

- Born: 10 February 1844; Arran Hill, County Tipperary, Ireland
- Died: 4 October 1931 (aged 87); Bournemouth, England
- Occupation: civil engineer
- Known for: work on the Madras Railway

Edward Waller Stoney (10 February 1844 – 4 October 1931) was an Irish engineer, noted for his work in India on the Madras Railway.

== Early life and education ==
Edward Waller Stoney was born on 10 February 1844 at Arran Hill (sometimes Arranhill), County Tipperary, the son of Thomas George Stoney, a Justice of the peace and his wife, Anna Henrietta Waller. He had 7 siblings including the engineer, Francis Goold Morony Stoney. He was educated at home before attending Queen’s College, Galway from 1860 to 1863, under an engineering scholarship. Stoney won the first Peel Exhibition competition between students in Belfast, Cork and Galway Queen's Colleges. He received the gold medal for his final examinations, and was later awarded a Masters of Engineering. He was then a pupil of Samuel Ussher Roberts for two years.

== Career ==
Stoney moved to India in July 1866, having been appointed fourth-class engineer on the Madras Railway. In his early career he oversaw the completion of Tungabadra and Pennair Bridges, describing this work in his first contribution to the Proceedings of The Institution of Civil Engineers in 1875. He was awarded a Telford Premium for his paper on his New Chittravati Bridge to the Institution of Civil Engineers in 1891.

He was promoted to first-class engineer in 1870, often acting up as deputy or as chief engineer. Stoney was appointed substantive chief engineer in October 1898, and Agent and Manager of the Railway in 1902. He retired on 5 March 1904, and was awarded the Companionship of the Order of the Indian Empire by King Edward VII at Buckingham Palace on 5 July 1904.

Stoney was a fellow of the Madras University from 1891, and a member of the Institution of Civil Engineers of Ireland in 1868. In May 1875, he was elected a full member of the Institution of Civil Engineers. He also invented the "Stoney’s Patent Silent Punkah-wheel".

== Death and family ==
Stoney married Sarah Crawford of Cartron Abbey, Longford in 1878. They had two sons and a daughter, Ethel Sara (1881–1976), who was the mother of Alan Turing. Stoney married a second time, in 1925, to Rose Bruce, widow of Colonel N. Thurston Swanston.

Stoney died on 4 October 1931 at his home, Summerset, Branksome Park, Bournemouth.
