= Edward Duncan Stoney =

Irish engineer

- Born: 31 July 1868; Dundalk, Ireland
- Died: 8 February 1898 (aged 29); Ipswich, England
- Occupation: civil engineer
- Known for: work on sluices

Edward Duncan Stoney (31 July 1868 – 8 February 1898) was a Victorian era Irish engineer, noted for his work on sluices.

== Early life and education ==
Edward Duncan Stoney was born on 31 July 1868 at Dundalk, the only son of Francis Goold Morony Stoney and Annie Elizabeth Duncan (1843-1923).

== Career ==
Stoney studied for 3 years at the City and Guilds of London Central Institution, and was awarded an Associate of the Institute in 1889. From that year he worked as a civil engineer living at Tumbricane, Ipswich and working for Ransomes & Rapier. There he oversaw the ironwork for the Weaver Sluices on the Manchester Ship Canal, and from 1890 oversaw all the sluice erection work on that canal. Through this work he devised a method of calculating the position and loading of beams in sluices. From 1892, he was appointed Resident Engineer in charge of the steel bridge and the sluices on the Thames at Richmond, which he worked on until 1894. He was elected as an associate member of the Institute of Civil Engineers on 4 Dec 1894.

In 1895 he was appointed to design of the sluices and bridge for the River Clyde at Glasgow, and then took on all sluice designs at Ransomes & Rapier.

== Family ==
He married Ellen Naomi Pope (1869-1964) eldest daughter of George Harrison Pope and Naomi Cox in July 1892. They had one son Francis George Duncan (1893-1916) and two daughters Catherine Ruth (1894-1984) and Margaret Naomi (1897-1983). Stoney died of pleurisy and pneumonia at Ipswich on 8 February 1898, aged 29.
