= NCK =

Agricultural equipment firm in the UK

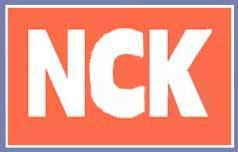
- Company type: Private
- Industry: Heavy equipment, mechanical engineering
- Founded: 1794; 232 years ago
- Headquarters: Selston, Nottinghamshire, England, UK
- Products: Cranes, spares, fabrication
- Owner: Delden Cranes Ltd
- Parent: Newton, Chambers & Co.
- Subsidiaries: Ransomes & Rapier
- Website: www.nckcranes.co.uk

NCK (Newton Chambers Koehring), started as a subsidiary of Newton, Chambers & Company, a large engineering company based in Sheffield, England. They produced the range of agricultural equipment, skimmers, excavators, cranes and draglines that were renowned for high quality and long life, typically over 20 years. Many NCK machines continue to operate worldwide.

== History ==
The company started as iron founders in 1794 and expanded in Victorian times to include coal and iron mining. They diversified into equipment manufacture and in 1947 the company started producing the American brands of Koehring excavators under the Newton Chambers Koehring name, and in 1958 they took over Ransomes & Rapier building excavators, drag-lines, port cranes and other construction equipment under the NCK-Rapier brand. With the decline in coal and the improvements in hydraulic machines, the company diversified into light fabrication.

The company was taken over in 1972 by the holding company Central and Sheerwood. NCK later was sold to Robert Maxwell's media group as part of a wider deal, but Maxwell was not interested in cranes and NCK became inactive. Cliffe Holdings then bought the company, later Staffordshire Public Works bought the company in 1997 after it fell again into receivership.

NCK launched a new model, the 90T HC90 Astra crane in 2000 but it was not successful, 3 units were manufactured and are owned by Delden CSE Ltd as part of their hire fleet. The only other UK crawler crane business, Ruston-Bucyrus, also stopped manufacture in 2009. The last crawler crane supplied by NCK was a Nova in 2001. SPW now runs an active spares and overhaul business for its cranes and fabricates NCK plant to order as well as manufacturing traffic control and filtration equipment.

== Acquisition ==
In February 2012, the business of NCK Cranes was acquired by Delden Cranes Ltd, and will continue to supply spare parts and offer machine overhauls from its facilities in Selston, Nottinghamshire, UK. The acquisition of NCK follows the acquisition of RB Cranes Ruston-Bucyrus by Delden Cranes Ltd in October 2009.

== See also ==
- Dragline excavator
- Heavy equipment
- Ransomes & Rapier
- Ruston-Bucyrus
