= Francis Goold Morony Stoney =

Irish engineer

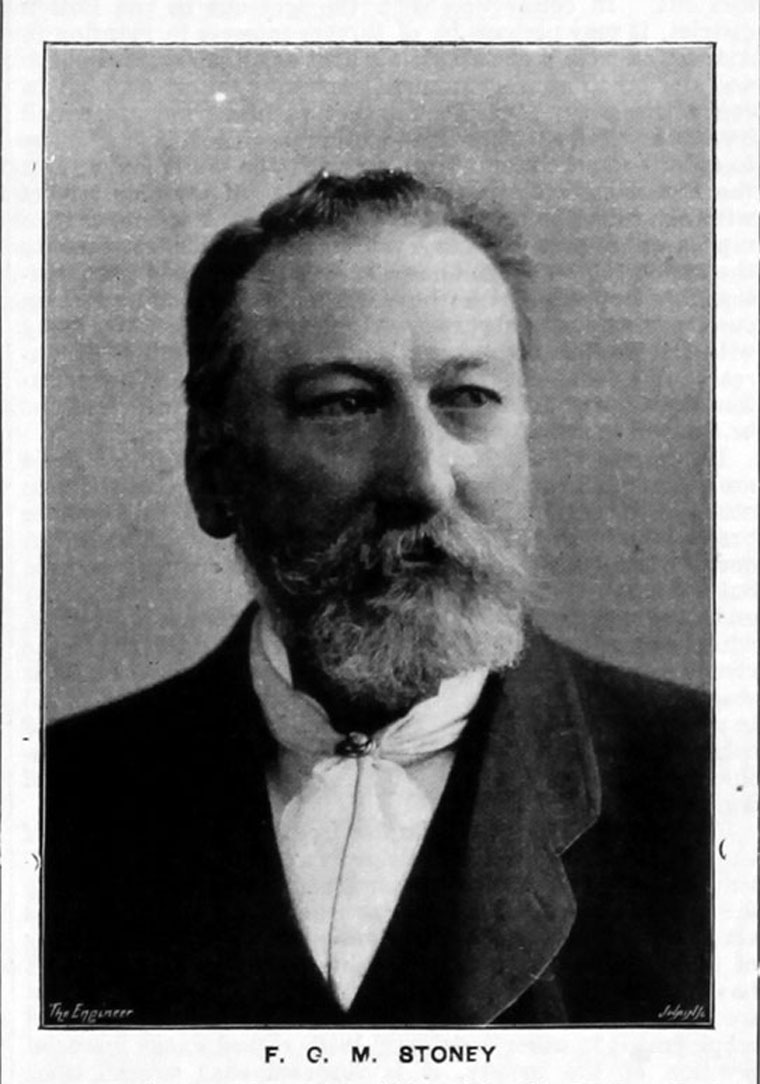
- Born: 5 April 1837; Arran Hill, County Tipperary, Ireland
- Died: 7 August 1897 (aged 60); Neuenahr, Germany
- Occupation: civil engineer
- Known for: work on sluices

Francis Goold Morony Stoney (5 April 1837 – 7 August 1897) was a Victorian era Irish engineer, noted for his work on sluice design.

== Early life and education ==
Francis Goold Morony Stoney was born on 5 April 1837 at Arran Hill (sometimes Arranhill), County Tipperary, the son of Thomas George Stoney, a Justice of the peace and his wife, Anna Henrietta Waller. He had 7 siblings including the engineer, Edward Waller Stoney, through whom Stoney was a granduncle of Alan Turing. He was educated at Queen's College in Belfast before being articled to John Macneill, a railway engineer.

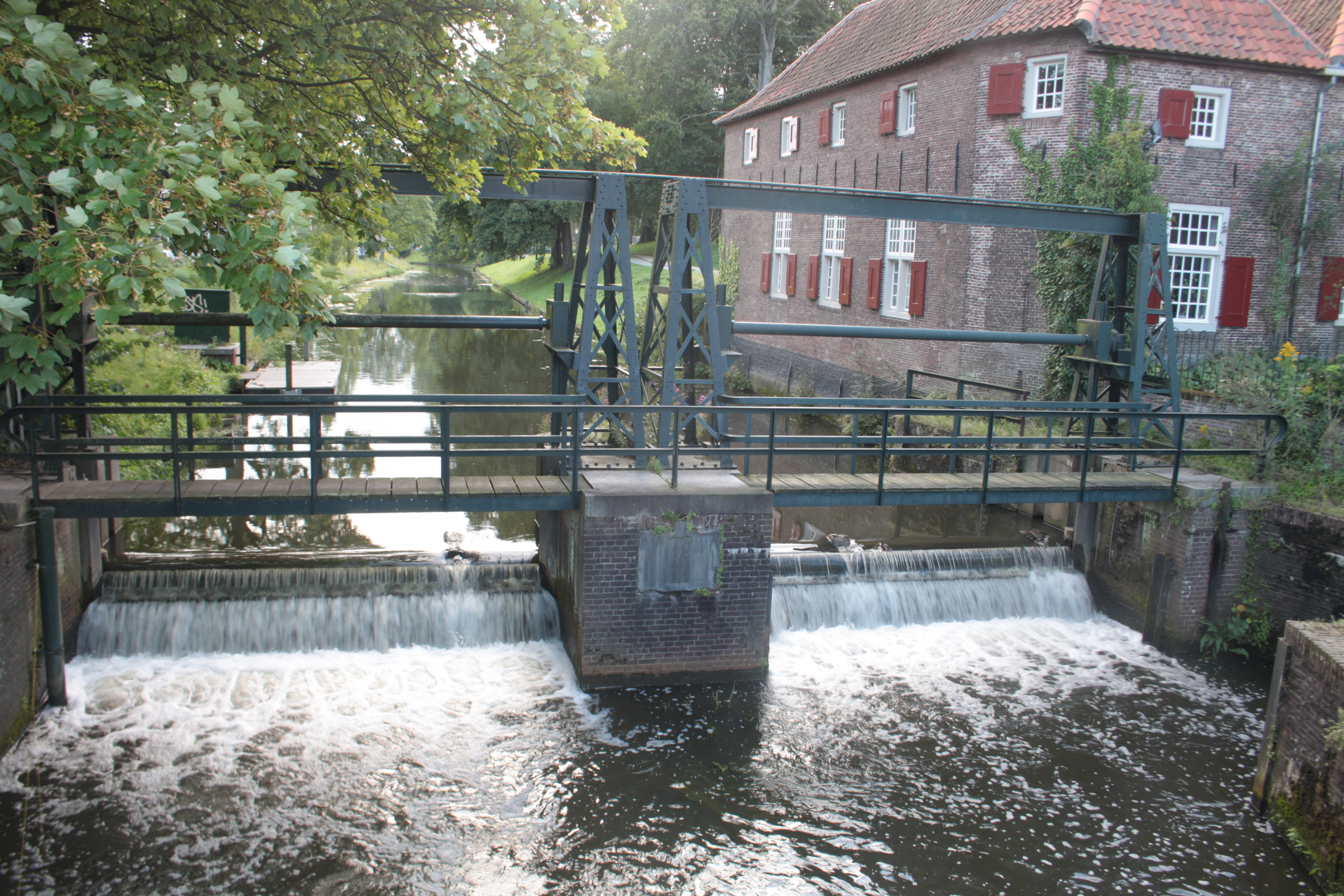
Stoney sluice in Amersfoort, the Netherlands (1910)

== Career ==
Stoney later became manager of the Dundalk Ironworks. In May 1865 he was employed by a Clyde-based shipbuilding company, John Elder & Co. and was sent to work in Peru, on the Callao Floating Dock. He returned to England before departing for India in 1868, working as a contractor on the Madras Railway, and later as personal assistant to the Chief Engineer of the Madras Navigation and Canal Company. It was his involvement in this enterprise that elicited Stoney's interest in the design of sluices.

In 1869 he worked on the design of a double-door sluice, but suffering from poor health he was forced to return to England, where he remained invalided for about two years. He stayed in contact with his previous employer though, designing and patenting several sluices, including an equilibrium sluice to work under 100 feet head. In 1873 he patented his cylindrical sluice, 28 of which were later used on the Weaver Navigation. Stoney's third patent was for his roller sluice, which offered a more practical solution than his previous inventions.

At the time Stoney was employed as Chief Draughtsman for a company in Glasgow, but poor health again forced him to resign. In August 1876 he worked as a consulting engineer in Westminster. In 1878 he designed an award-winning steam-ferry which ran between Greenwich and Poplar, and in 1880 he designed a pier at Hove, but most of his efforts were directed toward the development and promotion of his roller sluice. About 1880 he patented a double-door roller sluice, suited for graving docks, and also a rolling flap-valve, used in tidal sewage outfalls.

Four of Stoney's roller sluices were installed at Lough Erne in 1883. Many more, built by Ransomes & Rapier (for whom Stoney had been appointed works manager in 1887) were installed on the newly built Manchester Ship Canal, which opened in 1894. The resulting publicity increased the demand for Stoney's designs, leading to installations on the Rhone in Geneva, the River Thames at Richmond, and on the River Clyde at Glasgow. Stoney also worked on designs for steam cranes, introducing improvements to tipping cranes, some of which were used to dredge the Manchester Ship Canal.

== Family ==
He married Annie Elizabeth Duncan (1843-1923) only daughter of Alexander Duncan on the 10 August 1865 at Dundalk. They had one son Edward Duncan Stoney (1868-1898) a civil engineer who also worked for Ransomes & Rapier in Ipswich. Stoney died at Neuenahr in Germany, on 7 August 1897, aged 61.

== See also ==
- List of canal engineers
- List of Irish inventions and discoveries
