= Naomi Stoney =

English artist

- Born: Margaret Naomi Stoney; 4 September 1897; Ipswich, England
- Died: 11 May 1983 (aged 85); Spider Hall, Raydon, Hadleigh, Suffolk
- Parent: Edward Duncan Stoney

Naomi Stoney also known as "Tony Stoney" (4 September 1897 – 11 May 1983) was an English artist known for her depictions of animals.

== Life ==
Naomi Stoney was born Margaret Naomi Stoney on 4 September 1897 in Ipswich. Her parents were Edward Duncan Stoney, a civil engineer, and Ellen Naomi Pope (1869–1964), and she was the youngest of three children. She had a brother, Francis George Duncan who also became a civil engineer, and a sister, Catherine Ruth. Her father died aged 29 in 1898 and the family moved to Eastbourne to live with their paternal grandmother, Anne Elizabeth Stoney. Francis was killed in action during WWI on 25 August 1916.

By 1921, Stoney and her sister were working as toy makers, with Stoney enrolling as a student in the East Anglian School of Painting and Drawing in 1937. While there she was given the nickname "Tony Stoney". Maggi Hambling attributed her interest in painting animals to "the first exhibition that she ever attended, at the age of about four or five [around 1950], was of paintings of bulls. The exhibition was held in a first-floor room of a public house in her hometown of Hadleigh, Suffolk. She was taken by her mother and remembered being 'amazed' by these paintings of bulls. The painter was 'Tony' Stoney, a local farmer, who had painted portraits of bulls for her farming friends."

Stoney was described as a farmer in 1939, and was living with her sister in Spider Hall, Raydon, Hadleigh, Suffolk. Stoney died there on 11 May 1983.
