= Cultivator No. 6 =

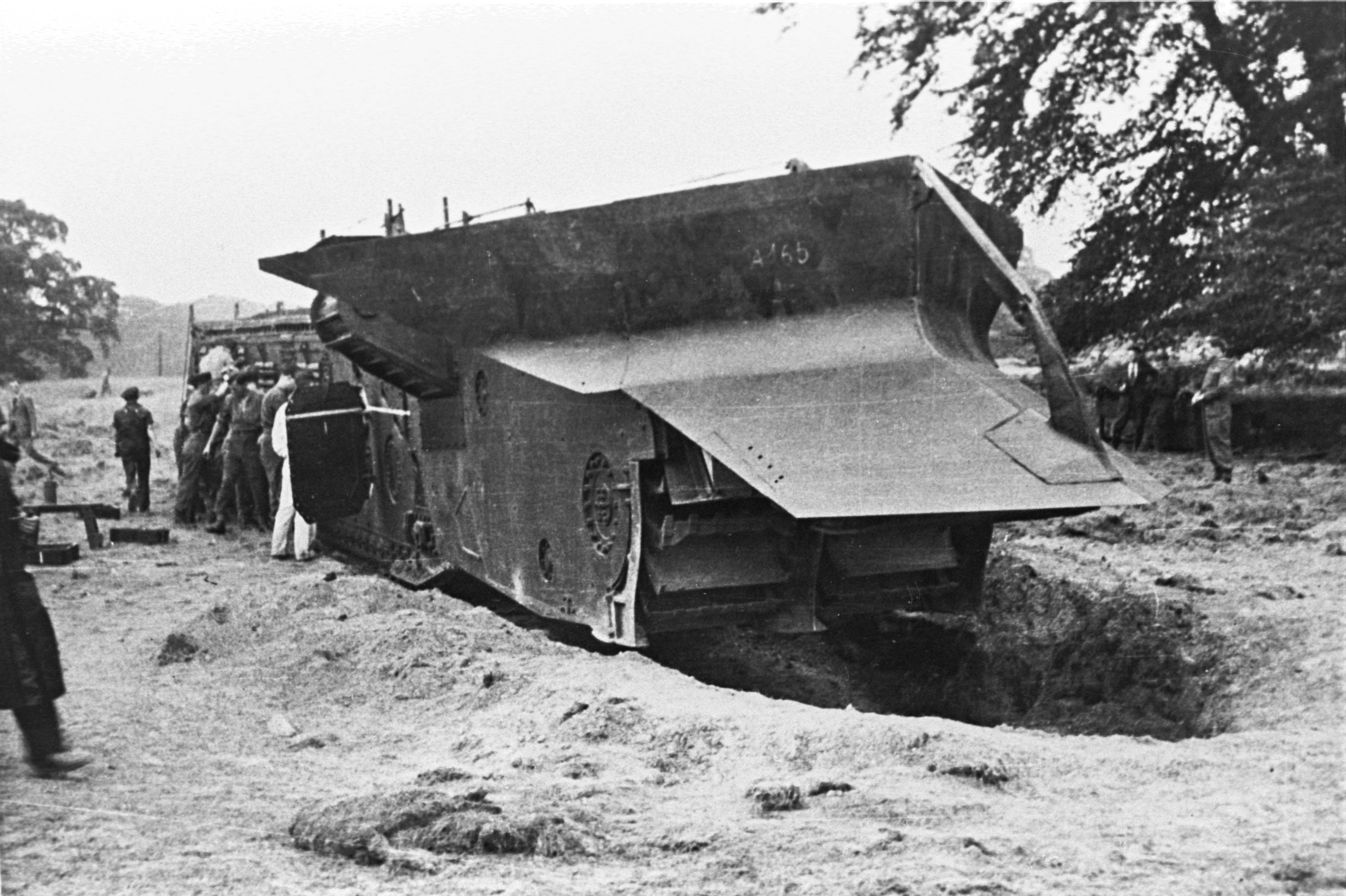
- Front view of a Cultivator No. 6, 25 July 1941
- Type: Experimental assault vehicle
- Place of origin: United Kingdom

Production history
- Designed: 1939
- Manufacturer: Ruston-Bucyrus

Specifications
- Mass: 130 tons
- Length: 77 feet 6 inches (23.6 m)
- Width: 7 feet 3 inches (2.2 m)
- Height: 10 feet 5 inches (3.2 m)
- Engine: Two, Davey, Paxman and Co Diesel engines 600 horsepower (450 kW)
- Maximum speed: 3.04 miles per hour (4.89 km/h) on surface

Cultivator No. 6 was the code name of a military trench-digging machine developed by the British Royal Navy at the beginning of World War II. The machine was originally known as White Rabbit Number Six; this code name was never officially recognised, but it was said to be derived from Churchill's metaphorical ability to pull ideas out of a hat. (Note: This codename is also highly suggestive of the White Rabbit character from Lewis Carroll's book Alice's Adventures in Wonderland who famously disappears down a hole. An echo of the original code name remained in the "WR" drawing numbers used by Ruston-Bucyrus. Possibly by coincidence, when recording a demonstration of Cultivator in 1941, General Alan Brooke likened another meeting earlier that day to the Mad Hatter's Tea Party.) The codename was changed to the less suggestive Cultivator Number Six to conceal its identity. The name was later changed to N.L.E. Tractors. Winston Churchill sometimes referred to the machine as his mole and the prototype machine was dubbed Nellie. It was lightly armoured and carried no weapons. It was designed to advance upon an enemy position largely below ground level by excavating a trench for itself as it went along. On reaching the enemy's front line, it would serve as a ramp for the troops and possibly tanks following in its trench.

Cultivator No. 6 was an enormous machine and was planned to be built in substantial numbers. The overall weight was 130 tons and the length was 77 feet 6 inches (23.6 m). The machine's development and production was enthusiastically backed by Winston Churchill, and work on it continued well past the point when there was no obvious use for it. In the end, only a small number of machines were constructed and none were used in combat. In his memoirs, Churchill said about it: "I am responsible but impenitent".

== Inception ==
After the outbreak of World War II on 3 September 1939, the day Britain declared war on Germany, Winston Churchill was appointed First Lord of the Admiralty and a member of the War Cabinet, just as he had been during the first part of World War I. Britain despatched an expeditionary force to France, which took up positions on the northernmost portion of the French border with Belgium. A line of inter-supporting fortifications and defensive position, known as the Maginot Line, helped to defend France's border with Germany, and much of the Allies' effort went into extending those defences to the north. Trenches were dug, barbed wire was stretched out and pillboxes were built, but hardly a shot was fired in anger. This period became known as the Phoney War. To the British and French public, this was a conflict between professional fighting forces and there was little appetite for an all-out ideological war.

Churchill had no doubts as to Hitler's true character. He saw no hope of peace and was appalled by the Allies' lack of initiative. He had a number of ideas for taking the war to the enemy, two of which required the invention of entirely new weapons. One idea was for a riverine mine for Operation Royal Marine which was at least water-borne, but Churchill was a man of ideas and his position at the Admiralty did not constrain him to strictly naval matters. When Churchill had served as the First Lord of the Admiralty in the First World War and he had been largely responsible for the establishment of the Royal Navy's Landships Committee, which sponsored experiments with armoured tractors that eventually resulted in the invention of the tank. At that time, Churchill had also conceived the idea of an armoured vehicle that would dig its own trench as it advanced upon an enemy position, a trench sufficiently deep and wide to protect the machine itself, as well as infantry and vehicles following in its wake. The idea did not catch on at the time but he resurrected it. The development of the trench-digging machine was initially undertaken by the Department of Naval Constructors. Despite a lack of enthusiasm from the War Office, it was planned to build a fleet of such machines.

Although Churchill lacked mechanical knowledge, he had a clear understanding of what he wanted. He saw this machine as one of very few aggressive initiatives by the Allies during the Phoney War. The machine he envisioned would be capable of breaking the stalemate of trench warfare that had developed during World War I, and would thereby avoid the atrocious conditions and high casualty rate that resulted. The prospect of such fighting in World War II was made even worse by the construction by the Germans of the Siegfried Line ( Westwall), a continuous belt of barbed-wire entanglements, minefields, anti-tank obstacles, forts and trenches, the strength of which was greatly exaggerated by German propaganda. Churchill's trench cutters would cross no man's land in the dark and, protected by an artillery barrage, the attacking force would advance in the relative safety of the cut trench and burst upon the surprised defenders.

...I knew that the carnage of the previous war had bitten deeply into the soul of the French people. The Germans had been given time to build the Siegfried Line. How frightful to hurl the remaining manhood of France against this wall of fire and concrete!

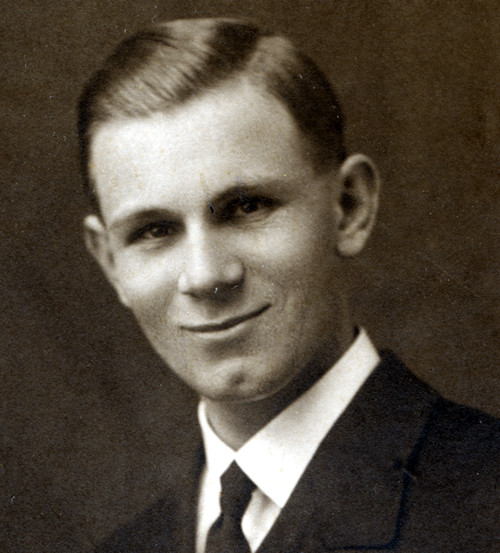
The brilliant but inexperienced young marine engineer Frank Spanner, who prepared the initial design

Churchill explained what he had in mind to Stanley Goodall, who was then Director of Naval Construction. In October 1939, the project was handed over to J.H. Hopkins. Hopkins, who had had a distinguished career in ship design, was given the temporary rank of assistant director and was tasked with bringing together a team of designers who would make Churchill's machine – his mole as he sometimes called it – a reality. A top secret department was set up under the Ministry of Supply, which was known as the Department of Naval Land Equipment and was abbreviated to NLE, giving rise to the name Nellie that was given to the prototype machine. At the start of the war, much of the Admiralty was moved away from London. It was for this reason that the trench digger project began in the Grand Pump Room Hotel in Bath. There, Hopkins put the initial investigation into the hands of the brilliant, but inexperienced, Frank Spanner.

== Development ==
The machine had a simple task to perform. Essentially, the requirement was to cut a trench with a section of about six feet (2 m) square and for this some sort of cutter was required. Correctly estimating the power required to perform this feat was essential to the success of the project, but the nearest comparable machine the designers could take figures from were the giant bucket and chain excavators used in Germany for open cast mining of lignite. The key feature of such machines was that the cutting was a continuous process that required a fairly constant power, and from this comparison the trenching machine power requirement was estimated at 1,000 hp (750 kW), half of which was for cutting and half for driving the machine forward.

Initial designs envisaged a large circular cutter the diameter of the trench to be dug and operating in the manner of modern tunnel boring machines. However, the design evolved to a more efficient arrangement with a huge plough removing the top 2 feet 6 inches (0.76 m) of soil and a cutting cylinder rotating perpendicular to the line of the trench for digging out the lower 2 feet 6 inches (0.76 m). The trench profile was then squared off by a number of blades. The spoil was deposited on both sides of the trench, wings on the plough blade pushing the spoil away from the edge of the trench to prevent it from falling back in. Hopkins presented this conception together with a static model to Churchill via Sir Stanley Goodall. Churchill approved the scheme and gave permission for development of a prototype to begin with an initial grant of £1,000,000.

The Navy turned to Ruston-Bucyrus Ltd, an engineering company specialising in excavating equipment. Ruston-Bucyrus had been established in 1930 and was jointly owned by Ruston and Hornsby based in Lincoln, England and Bucyrus-Erie based in Bucyrus, Ohio, in the United States – the latter of which had operational control. On 6 December 1939, Churchill was told that Ruston-Bucyrus would be able to build 200 trench-cutting machines by March 1941, and they proposed a wider version that would produce a trench in which tanks could drive. Churchill gave the go-ahead for the production of a prototype but deferred deciding the final quantities.

A scale model about four feet long was prepared by the firm of Bassett-Lowke; they worked secretly in the cellars of a hotel in Bath – Bath being the temporary home of the Naval Construction department at the time. As soon as it was complete, Churchill ordered that it be taken to London. The model together with its accessories was packed into a mahogany box resembling a coffin; as it was carried to the station in Bath, many bystanders respectfully bowed their heads.

The working model was demonstrated to Churchill on 12 December 1939. For this a simulated soil had been developed from a mixture of sawdust and Plasticine. The demonstration went so well that Churchill's smile of pleasure "almost dislodged his cigar" and he ordered that a further demonstration should be arranged for that evening, to which Churchill was accompanied by the prime minister, Neville Chamberlain, the Chancellor of the Exchequer Sir John Simon and the Chief of the Imperial General Staff Sir Edmund Ironside. (Note: There is disagreement in the sources as to what time this meeting took place. Newman (1956) gives 11 pm whereas Ironside (1962) gives 7 pm.) Ironside later recalled:

At 7 p.m. I went over to see Winston Churchill at the Admiralty. He told me that he wanted to show me his "Cultivator". I found that he had invented and reduced to a model a machine that would go through the earth at a good pace... I thought that we could make a great deal of these machines and they present the first of any possible offensive idea.

Churchill used the model (or possibly another static model) to persuade the French to support the project, to which they somewhat reluctantly agreed. An official order was placed with Ruston-Bucyrus on 22 January 1940. On 7 February 1940 the government gave approval for the construction of 200 narrow "infantry" and 40 wider "officer" machines, the latter creating a trench wide enough for tanks.

In the following weeks, the Germans noticed intense patrol activity in front of the Siegfried Line as the French collected soil samples so that technicians could determine the most suitable places for the Cultivators to advance. However, the production of Cultivator almost immediately faced a problem: Ruston-Bucyrus intended to use Rolls-Royce Merlin engines, but the Air Ministry had reserved the entire production of Merlins for RAF use. They called in Harry Ricardo, who suggested using a pair of 600 hp (450 kW) lightweight diesel engines built by Davey, Paxman and Co. The change meant a great deal of redesign work, but the new arrangement had some advantages. Now one engine would be used for the cutter and one for moving the machine, which simplified some aspects of the design, and diesel fuel was safer than the petrol required by the Merlin engine.

== Design ==
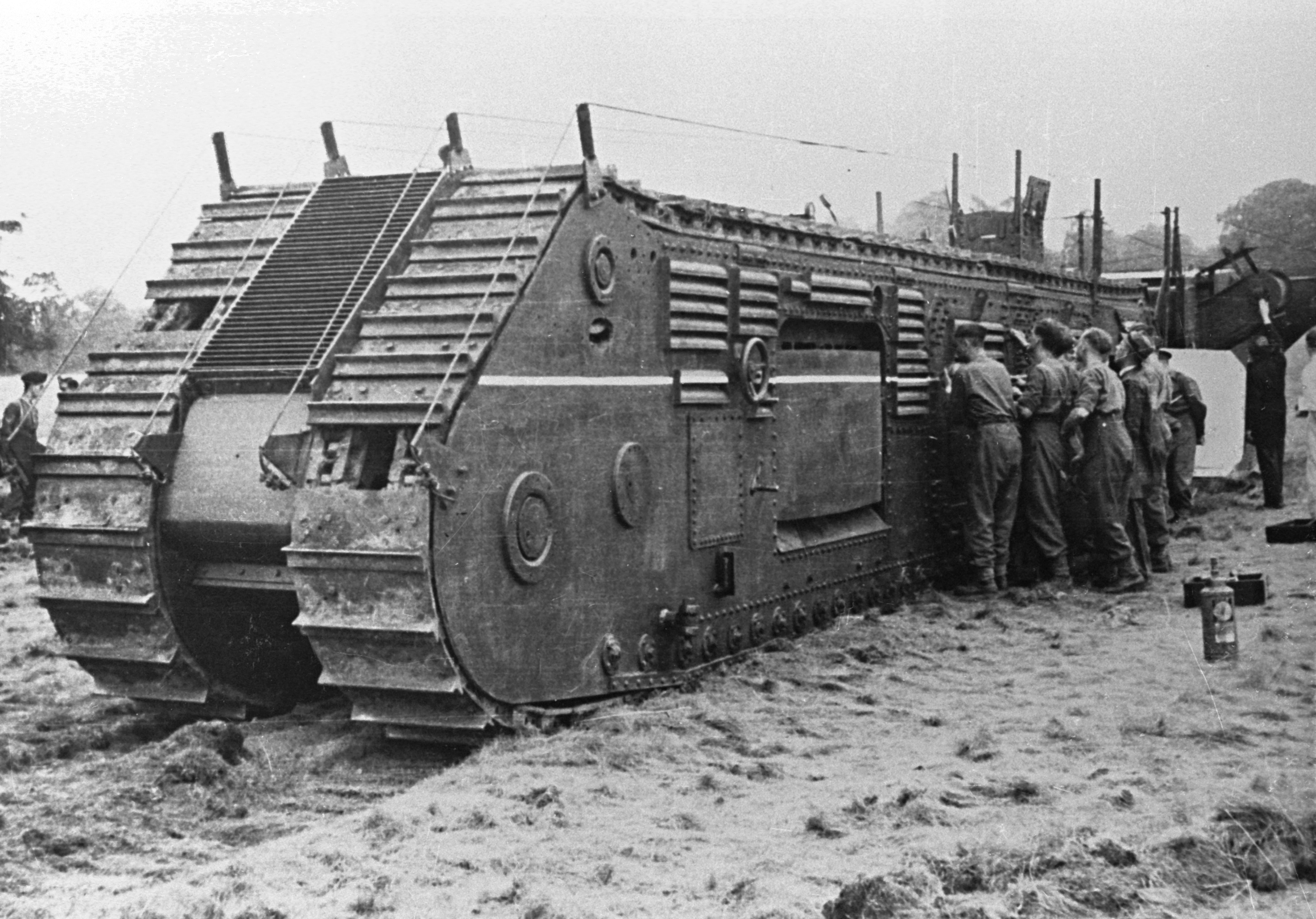
Nellie above ground rear three quarters view

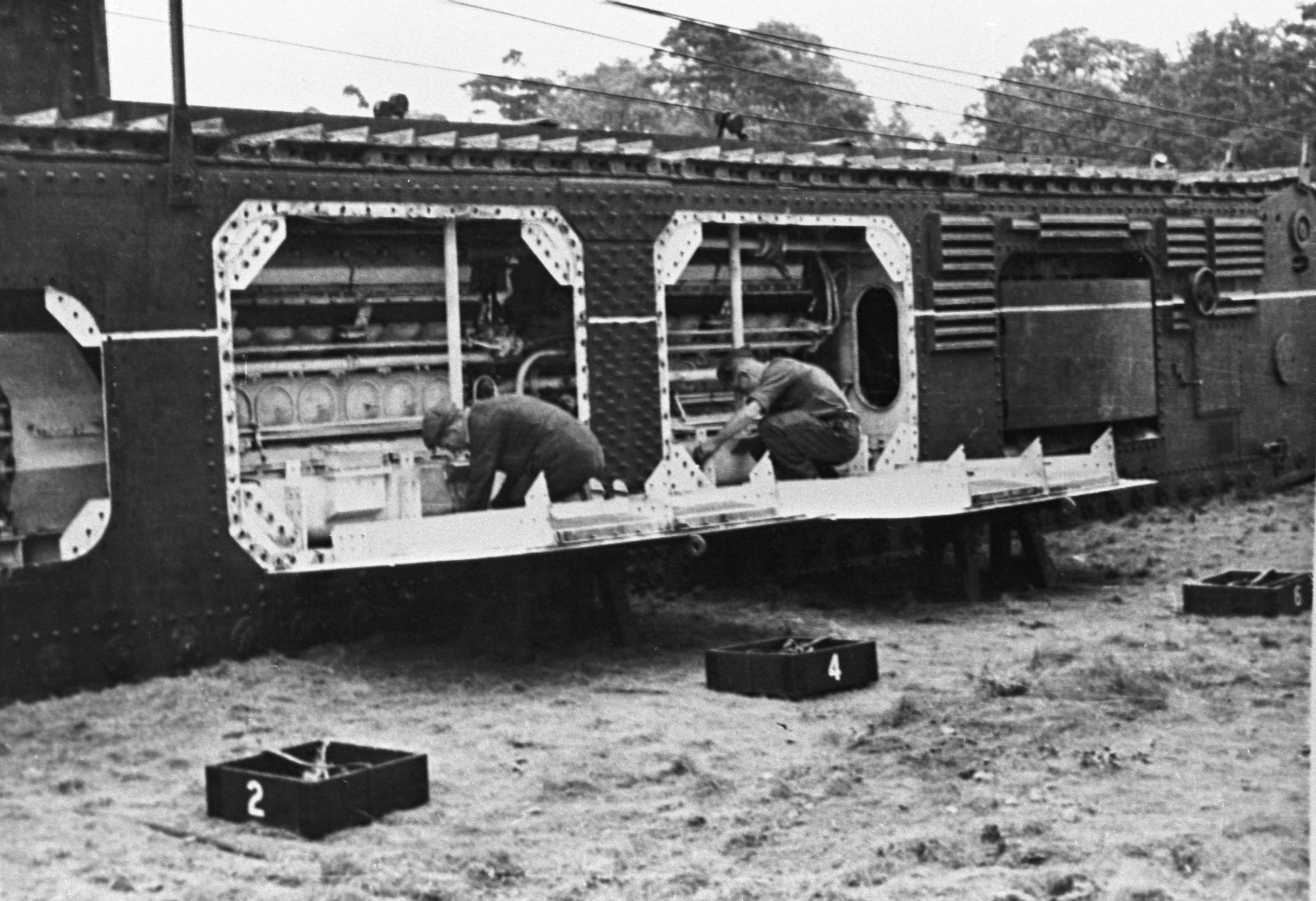
Nellie's engine compartment

Cultivator was designed to cut a trench 7 feet 6 inches (2.29 m) wide and 5 feet (1.5 m) deep, and it would dispose of the spoil on banks either side of the cut trench. It could dig at 0.42 or 0.67 miles per hour (0.68 or 1.08 km/h) or travel at 3.04 miles per hour (4.89 km/h) on the surface.

When configured in digging order, the overall length of the machine was 77 feet 6 inches (23.62 m). The machine came in two parts that were hinged together. The head of the machine did the excavating and could be raised or lowered for ascent or descent.

The head of the machine was 30 feet 6 inches (9.30 m) long and 7 feet 3 inches (2.21 m) wide and 8 feet 7 inches (2.62 m) high and weighted about 30 tons. The head had a plough blade for cutting the top part of the trench to a depth of about 2 feet 6 inches (0.76 m), raising the excavated soil and pushing it to the sides of the trench. The lower part of the trench was cut to a depth of 2 feet 6 inches (0.76 m) by a cylindrical cutter superficially resembling the cutting blade of a cylinder lawnmower. Conveyors raised the excavated soil which was added to the plough's deposits at the side of the trench. The overall depth of the trench was 5 feet (1.5 m) and the spoil provided an additional cover of about 2 feet (0.61 m).

The body of the machine came in two halves so that it could be divided for transportation, the front portion of the body was 23 ft 4 in (7.11 m) long, 6 ft 3 in (1.91 m) wide and 10 ft 5 in (3.18 m) high and weighed about 45 tons; the rear portion was 28 ft 4 in (8.64 m) long, 6 ft 3 in (1.91 m) wide and 8 ft 7 in (2.62 m) high and weighed about 55 tons.

The body was driven by two tracks that were 2 feet (0.61 m) wide, and on the surface steering was possible by means of dog clutches on the gear-box output shafts. When digging, only small changes in direction were possible by means of hydraulically operated steering doors, one on each side of the machine. There was an arrangement to draw an adjustable amount of soil back into the trench and under the vehicle's tracks so as to counter any tendency to heel over.

== Alternative design ==
In April 1940, there came a huge surprise: someone else had invented a high-speed trenching machine envisaged to be used in a similar way but working by quite different means. The inventor was Cecil Vandepeer Clarke, who had recently worked on the limpet mine. Clarke had prepared a paper "A Consideration of New Offensive Means" and followed this with "Notes on Design of Trench Forming Machines" for the Royal Engineers. His ideas filtered through the wartime bureaucracy and eventually reached the Cultivator project team. Clarke was interviewed by Churchill's scientific advisor, Professor Lindemann. In strict confidence, Lindemann told Clarke about work already in progress and he was sufficiently impressed to pass Clarke's suggestions up to Churchill himself. Clarke accepted a job as a temporary civil servant; he was hired as an assistant director of NLE with a salary of £1,000 per annum.

Clarke's idea was to use an armoured vehicle of some sort equipped with a hydraulic ram to insert explosive charges into the ground ahead. The resulting explosion would form a crater into which the machine would move before repeating the cycle. Clarke's machine would require thick armour to protect itself from its own explosions at the front and from the possibility of attack from the rear. Nonetheless, the machine would be lighter and very much simpler than Cultivator. Also, Clarke's machine could simply blow its way through minefields and anti-tank obstacles that Cultivator could not deal with and when it came to a block house, Clarke's machine would push explosives under its floor and blow it up – whereas Cultivator was entirely unarmed. A significant disadvantage of Clarke's machine was its modest speed, estimated by Clarke to be only 250 yards per hour.

On 30 June 1940, Clarke resigned from NLE. The design of the Clarke Machine had "got beyond him", but it seems equally likely that Clarke was now disenchanted with the whole idea and thought he could contribute to the war in other ways. Although Clarke's ideas were not immediately abandoned at NLE, it is clear that little progress with them was made.

== Persistence ==
With Germany using fast mobile warfare in the Battle of France in May 1940, it was clearly time to reconsider the usefulness of Cultivator No. 6. Churchill wrote to General Ismay, his chief staff officer and General Ironside:

The change which has come over the war affects decisively the usefulness of "Cultivator No. 6". It may play its part in various operations, defensive and offensive, but it can no longer be considered the only method of breaking a fortified line. I suggest that the Minister of Supply should to-day be instructed to reduce the scheme by one half. Probably in a few days it will be to one-quarter. The spare available capacity could be turned over to tanks.

The number of units was soon even more significantly reduced to just 33 machines and by July Churchill was finding other tasks to assign to Mr Hopkins. Even so, the project was not completely cancelled – with Britain facing invasion and desperately short of conventional tanks it does seem remarkable that the project continued. Historian John Turner attributes this dogged persistence to Churchill's failure to get his mole accepted during the First World War. It was at this point that the original code name of Cultivator No. 6 was dropped in favour of N.L.E. Tractors.

There were various problems with the development, and the prototype machine, officially known as N.L.E Trenching Machine Mark I but nicknamed Nellie, was completed in May 1941.
