= Sundew (dragline) =

Dragline excavator used in mining in the UK

W1400 "Sundew"
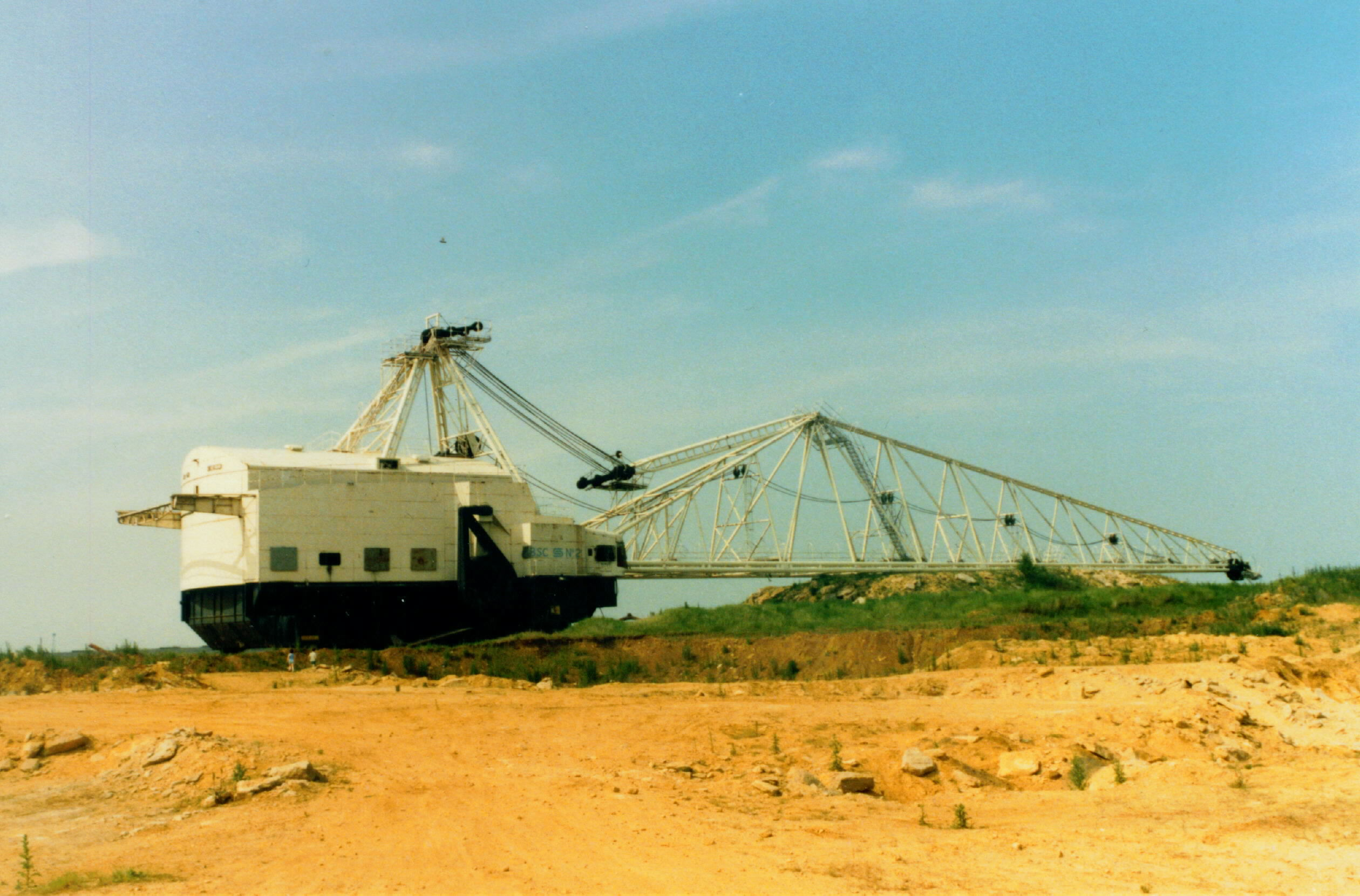
- The dragline W1400 N2 (similar to Sundew) which operated at Corby Steelworks at the same time as Sundew prior to being scrapped.
- Type: Dragline excavator
- Manufacturer: Ransomes & Rapier
- Production: 1957
- Length: 86 metres (282 ft)
- Weight: 1,675 long tons (1,702 t)
- Propulsion: 2x hydraulically driven walker feet
- Speed: 0.1 mph or 0.16 km/h
- Blade capacity: 27 long tons (27 t)

Sundew was a large electrically powered dragline excavator used in mining operations in Rutland and Northamptonshire in the United Kingdom from 1957. It was the lead ship of a series of four Type W1400-series dragline excavators.

== Specifications and History ==
Built by Ransomes & Rapier and named after the winning horse of the 1957 Grand National, it began work in a Rutland iron ore quarry belonging to the United Steel Companies (Ore Mining Branch) that year. At the time of its construction Sundew was the largest walking dragline in the world, weighing 1,675 long tons (1,702 t). With a reach of 86 metres (282 ft) and a bucket capacity of 27 long tons (27 t) the machine was able to move a substantial amount of material in a relatively short period.

Propulsion was via two large movable feet which could be used to "walk" the dragline forwards and backwards, while directional control was provided by a large circular turntable under the body of the machine.

Sundew remained until operations at the quarry ceased in 1974 and plans were then devised to relocate the machine to a recently opened British Steel Corporation quarry near Corby. At a cost of £250,000 and taking two years to complete, it was decided that dismantling, moving and reconstructing the machine was not a viable option, and so over an eight-week period in 1974 Sundew walked 13 miles (21 km) from its home in Exton Park near the village of Exton in Rutland to a site north of Corby. During the walk the dragline crossed three water mains, four water courses, thirteen power lines, ten roads, a railway line, two gas mains, seven telephone lines, 74 hedges, and the River Welland before reaching its new home.

As part of a major restructuring of British Steel in the late 1970s Corby Steelworks was closed down, and there was no longer any need for a large dragline to assist in the recovery of iron ore. On 4 July 1980 Sundew walked to its final resting place and the huge boom was lowered onto a purpose-built earth mound. There it remained for seven years until being scrapped from January to June 1987. The cab and bucket are preserved at Rutland Railway Museum which is now known as Rocks By Rail – The Living Ironstone Museum. In 2014 the Heritage Lottery Fund awarded £8,100 for the restoration of the cab.

== See also ==
- Big Muskie - largest walking dragline
