= Mining simulator =

Technology used for training miners

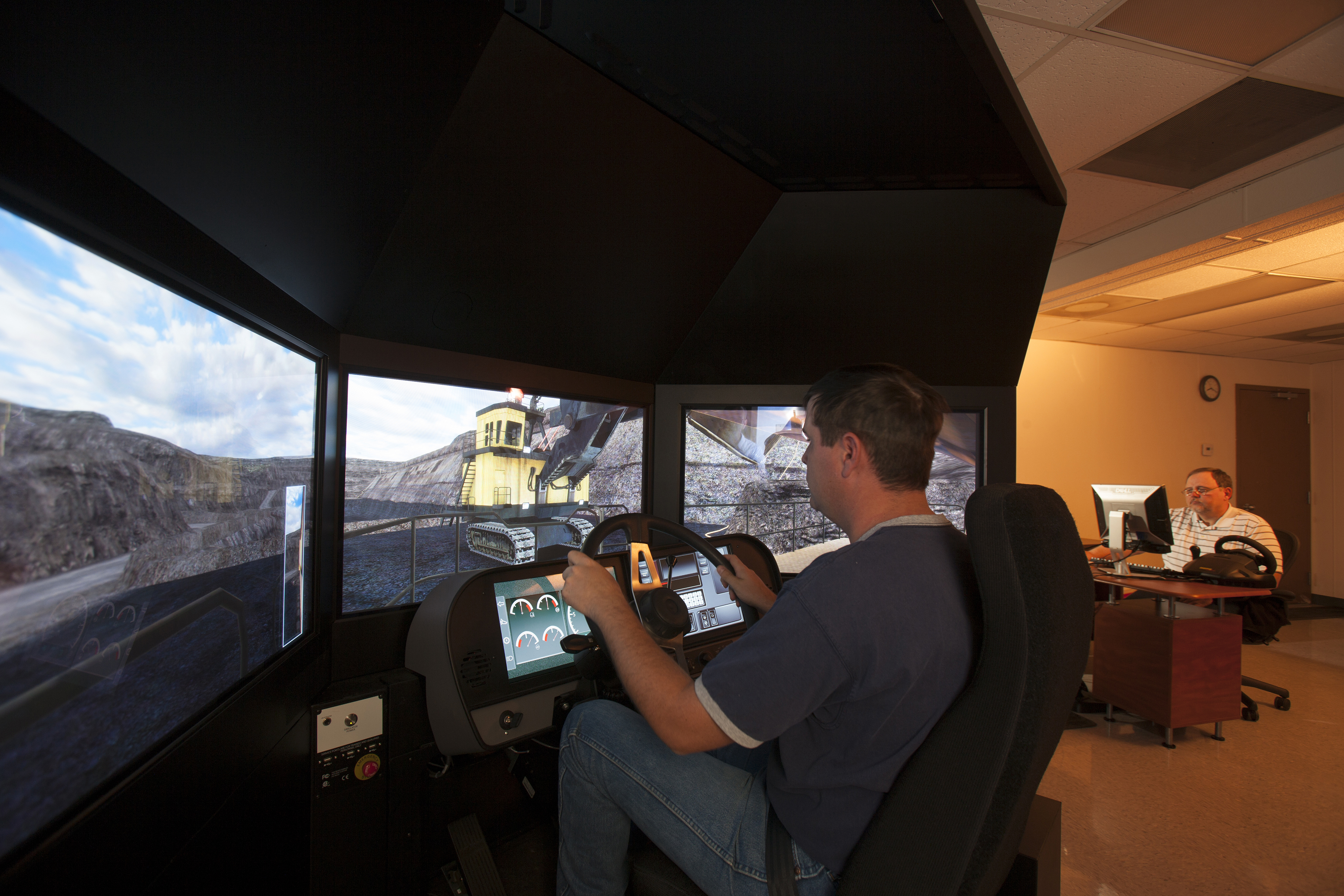
A coal mine training simulator (developed by Peabody Energy)

A mining simulator is a type of simulation used for entertainment as well as in training purposes for mining companies. These simulators replicate elements of real-world mining operations on surrounding screens displaying three-dimensional imagery, motion platforms, and scale models of typical and atypical mining environments and machinery. The results of the simulations can provide useful information in the form of greater competence in on-site safety, which can lead to greater efficiency and decreased risk of accidents.

== Training ==
Mining simulators are used to replicate real-world conditions of mining, assessing real-time responses from the trainee operator to react to what tasks or obstacles appear around them. This is often achieved through the use of surrounding three-dimensional imagery, motion platforms, and realistic replicas of actual mining equipment. Trainee operator employees are often taught in a program where they are scored against both their peers and an expert benchmark to produce a final evaluation of competence with the tasks they may need to complete in real-life.

=== Feedback ===
Mining companies that have implemented mining simulators into their training have shown greater employee competence in on-site safety, leading to an overall more productive working environment, and a higher chance of profitability for the company in the long-run by decreasing the risk of accidents, injuries, or deaths on the site though prior education. Being able to simulate real-world mining hazards in a safe and controlled environment has also shown to help prepare employees on proper procedure and protocol in the event of an on-site accident without the need to physically experience one, which often cannot be safely taught in the real-world. Simulating mining environments further helps to familiarize employees with mining equipment and vehicles before entering a real job site, leading to increased productivity, and a chance to correct inefficiencies while still in training.

=== Varieties ===
Mining simulator setups can range in size and features, which relates to the price and fidelity of the product. A simple simulator setup may only need to be installed on one Personal Computer or a virtual reality headset, but most often consist of three to six monitors and a motion platform. Any higher cost setups often are housed inside high-cube containers which may contain inside lighting, air conditioning, heating, and other amenities and add-ons which may not directly affect the effectiveness of the simulation training. Some mining simulators can also be mobile and move locations, which can be particularly helpful for use of the same simulator between multiple schools or colleges for apprentice programs.

== Entertainment ==
Aside from practical training purposes, mining simulators have in more recent times also been created for entertainment as well as gaming purposes. The appeal of the genre of games comes from the ability for them to be played on other than specialized equipment, including more widely available Personal Computers, PlayStation, and Xbox consoles. The genre of game also gained popularity from the broader amount of resources that could be added and mined in-game, often substituting more realistically found resources for precious minerals such as gold or diamonds, but coal mining games do exist. Non-rock or mineral mining simulation games have also emerged, with cryptocurrency mining simulations becoming a popular subgenre, allowing players to simulate mining for coins such as Bitcoin, Ethereum, and Dogecoin.

== See also ==
- Flight simulation
- Driving simulation
- Train simulation
- Submarine simulation
