= Newton, Chambers & Co. =

1789–2001 English industrial company

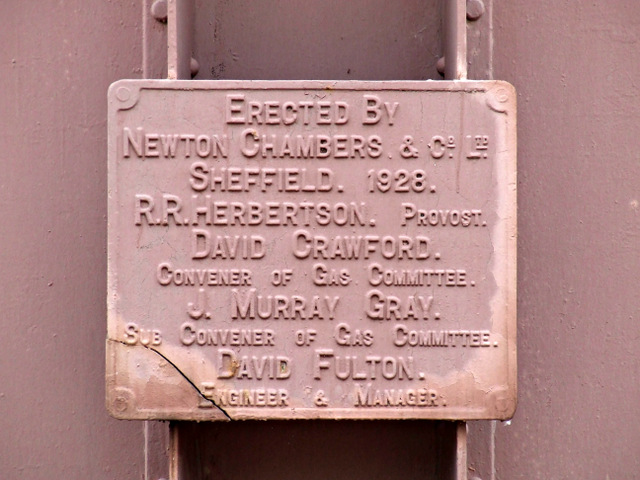
- Helensburgh gas works plaque (c. 1928)
- Industry: Manufacturing, arms manufacturing
- Predecessor: Ransomes & Rapier
- Founded: 1789; 237 years ago at Chapeltown, South Yorkshire, United Kingdom
- Founder: George Newton; Thomas Chambers
- Defunct: 2001; 25 years ago
- Fate: Taken over by Central & Sheerwood, which was subsequently acquired by TransTec plc
- Successor: Central & Sheerwood
- Subsidiaries: NCK; Ransomes & Rapier

Newton, Chambers & Co. was one of England's largest industrial companies. It was founded in 1789 by George Newton and Thomas Chambers.

== History ==
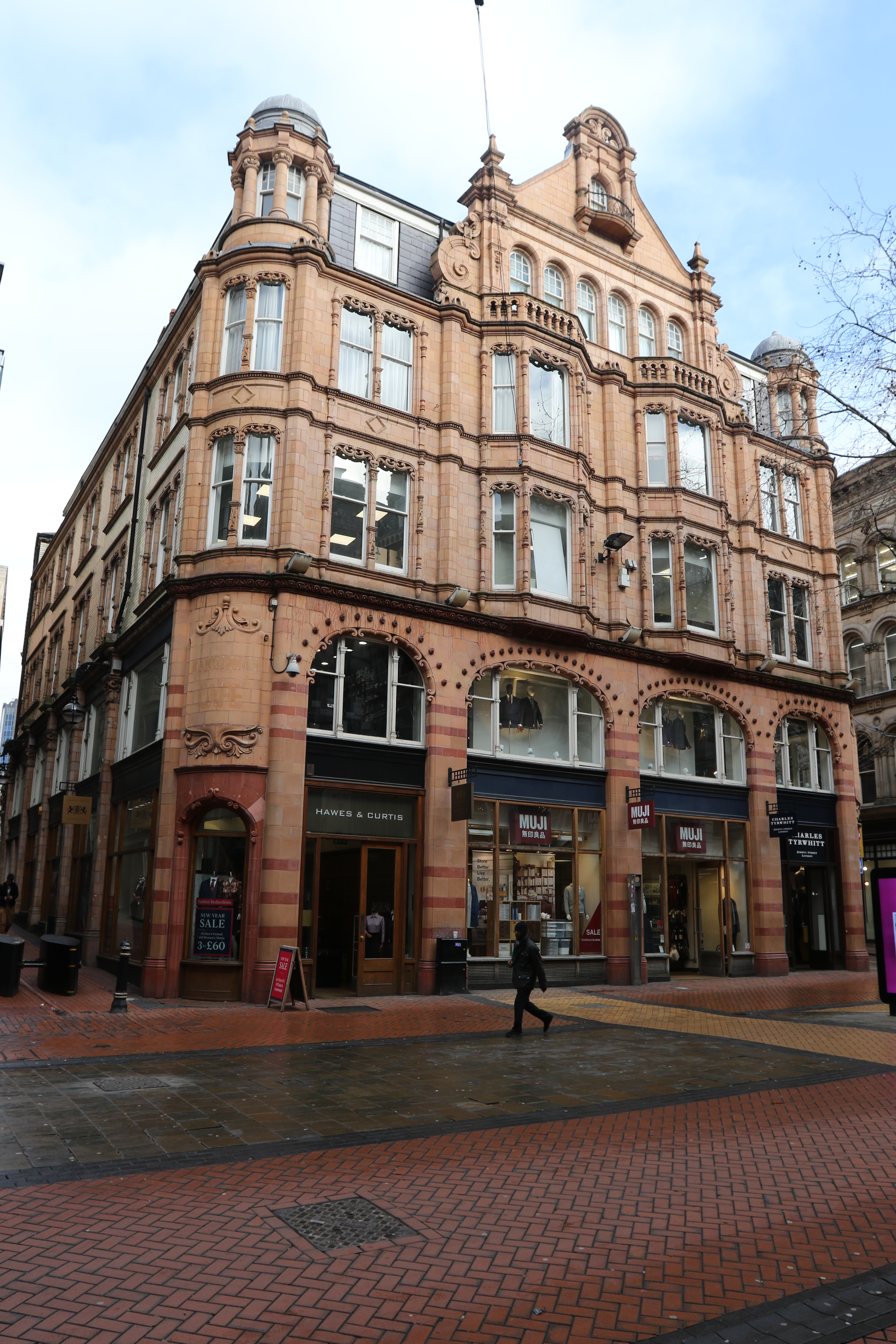
Building housing the headquarters of the Newton, Chambers & Co.

George Newton and Thomas Chambers were partners in the Phoenix foundry at Snow Hill, Sheffield and along with Henry Longden, they signed a lease to extract coal and ironstone from the Thorncliffe valley. The 21-year lease was signed in December 1793 and it gave them mining rights to the Thorncliffe valley from the Earl Fitzwilliam and set up their works on the Thorncliffe site near Chapeltown, to the north of Sheffield. The company built The Thorncliffe Ironworks beside the Blackburn Brook above the wooded valley slopes where the mining was to be carried out.

The first blast furnace was completed in April 1795 and the second in 1796. The first had a capacity of 15 tons of metal a week, while the second could produce 20 tons. The two furnaces were in operation for 78 years before being replaced in the 1870s. Around this time – for the first ten years' of the partnership's existence – interest paid on capital was limited to five per cent per annum and the working partners drew only "modest" salaries of £80 per annum. This policy was intended to encourage the growth of the business, and it certainly enabled it to survive some periods of poor trading, but by the early 19th century the practice of mostly leaving accrued profits within the business led to disputes with some sleeping partners.

In 1815 the partners met with William Murdoch, the inventor of coal-gas lighting, this being seen as providing a growth in work for their foundry. Coal, from the company's mines, was provided as charge for beehive coke ovens which were built on the site.

By the end of the 19th century the company were not only mining coal and ironstone but building blast furnaces, coke ovens and chemical plant. Heavy section iron, cast in the foundry was used in two iconic structures: Tower Bridge, crossing the river Thames in London, and the Eddystone Lighthouse.

During the 1890s, the company introduced its Izal disinfectant made from distilled coal tar. The name became well known for its use on a best-selling "medicated toilet paper" often found in schools and public lavatories, noted for its abrasive quality. According to the radio documentary Now Wash Your Hands, the reason for its ubiquity was because local authorities were given it as part of a bulk-purchasing agreement when ordering disinfectant.

== Second World War ==
In 1939 the Thorncliffe works came under the control of the Admiralty. A new workshop was constructed at Warren Lane, a short distance away from the Thorncliffe works, which was used to build army vehicles and became the largest manufacturer of Churchill tanks for the war effort. One of the tanks used to stand at the side of the road near the factory until recently.

William Joyce (Lord Haw Haw), in one of his radio broadcasts threatened to "dot the I" on the Izal name with a bomb. It was intended to destroy the source of the Churchill tanks. A near miss ensued, but the works remained intact.

== Post-war ==
The nationalisation of the coal mining and steel industries in 1948 saw the group forced to sell off its interests in these fields. However the company remained heavily involved in iron and steel founding and the production of chemicals from tar distillates, the basis of many products manufactured by its Izal subsidiary. The engineering part of the group designed and supplied all manner of process plant and equipment for the coal-gas, chemical and steel industries.

== Diversification ==
Before the Second World War they had started building excavators under licence from the American manufacturer Pawling and Harnischfeger (P&H) and sold them under the NCH brand name. About 1940/41 the connection with P&H was terminated and a licence was taken out with Koehring Co of Milwaukee selling the excavators under the name NCK. In 1958, the company acquired Ransomes & Rapier to become a major producer of excavators, draglines and other construction equipment. A new subsidiary company NCK-Rapier was formed, with production moving to Ipswich.

In 1960, the company acquired Ronuk Ltd, a manufacturer of wax polishes and wood stains based in Portslade, Brighton and with it the Ronseal brand name.

In 1961 the first of an order for 14 Newton Chambers double-deck car carriers was delivered to British Railways (Eastern Region). These featured a novel hydraulically operated central well capable of storing two cars below the four cars on the upper deck.

The group also set up Redfyre as a marketing company for coal-burning grates which were made in its foundry. Changes, in particular the Clean Air Act saw the company move into light fabrications and oil-fired central heating equipment, however, the oil-fired boiler market collapsed in autumn 1973 with the increase in prices.

In 1972 the group was taken over by industrial holding company Central & Sheerwood. Central & Sheerwood was acquired by Robert Maxwell in the 1980s and became TransTec plc in 1991 after merging with Geoffrey Robinson's company Transfer Technology. TransTec went into receivership at the end of 1999. In 2001 Newton, Chambers & Co. had ceased trading and was dissolved; TransTec was dissolved the following year.
