= Proceedings of the Institution of Civil Engineers: Smart Infrastructure and Construction =

- Discipline: Construction, Building automation, Infrastructure, Self-healing material, Structural health monitoring, 3D printing, Structural integrity and failure
- Language: English
- Edited by: José A.F.O. Correia, Noha Saleeb

Publication details
- History: 2017–present
- Publisher: Institution of Civil Engineers journal, Emerald Publishing
- Frequency: Quarterly
- Open access: Hybrid

Standard abbreviations
- ISO 4: Proc. Inst. Civ. Eng.: Smart Infrastruct. Constr.

Indexing
- ISSN: 2397-8759

Links
- Journal homepage; Emerald Publishing - JSMIC

Proceedings of the Institution of Civil Engineers: Smart Infrastructure and Construction is a quarterly peer-reviewed scientific journal that covers all aspects on theory, experimentation, and applications in Construction, Building automation, Infrastructure, Self-healing material, Structural health monitoring, 3D printing and Structural integrity and failure. It publishes theoretical and experimental research articles, technical articles, short communications, and reviews. It was established in 2017 and is published by Institution of Civil Engineers and Emerald Publishing. Dr. Jennifer Schooling of the University of Cambridge was founding Co-Editor-in-Chief of the Smart Infrastructure and Construction Proceedings journal (ICE). The editors-in-chief are José A.F.O. Correia (University of Porto, Portugal) and Noha Saleeb (Middlesex University, UK).

== Abstracting and indexing ==
The journal is abstracted and indexed in:

- Scopus
- Journal Citation Reports
- COPE
- DORA
- CNKI
- Compendex Engineering Village
- IET Inspec
