= Ruston-Bucyrus =

British manufacturer of steam shovels and cranes

RB Cranes
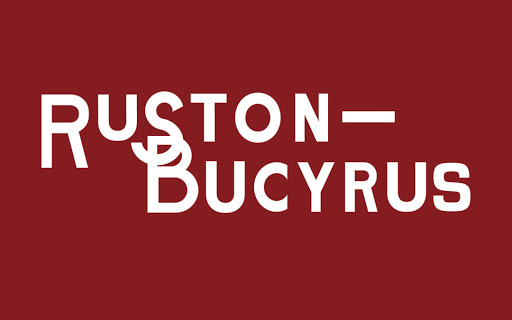
- Industry: Heavy equipment
- Headquarters: Selston, Nottinghamshire, England, UK
- Products: Cranes, spares, fabrication
- Owner: Delden Cranes Ltd
- Website: RB Cranes

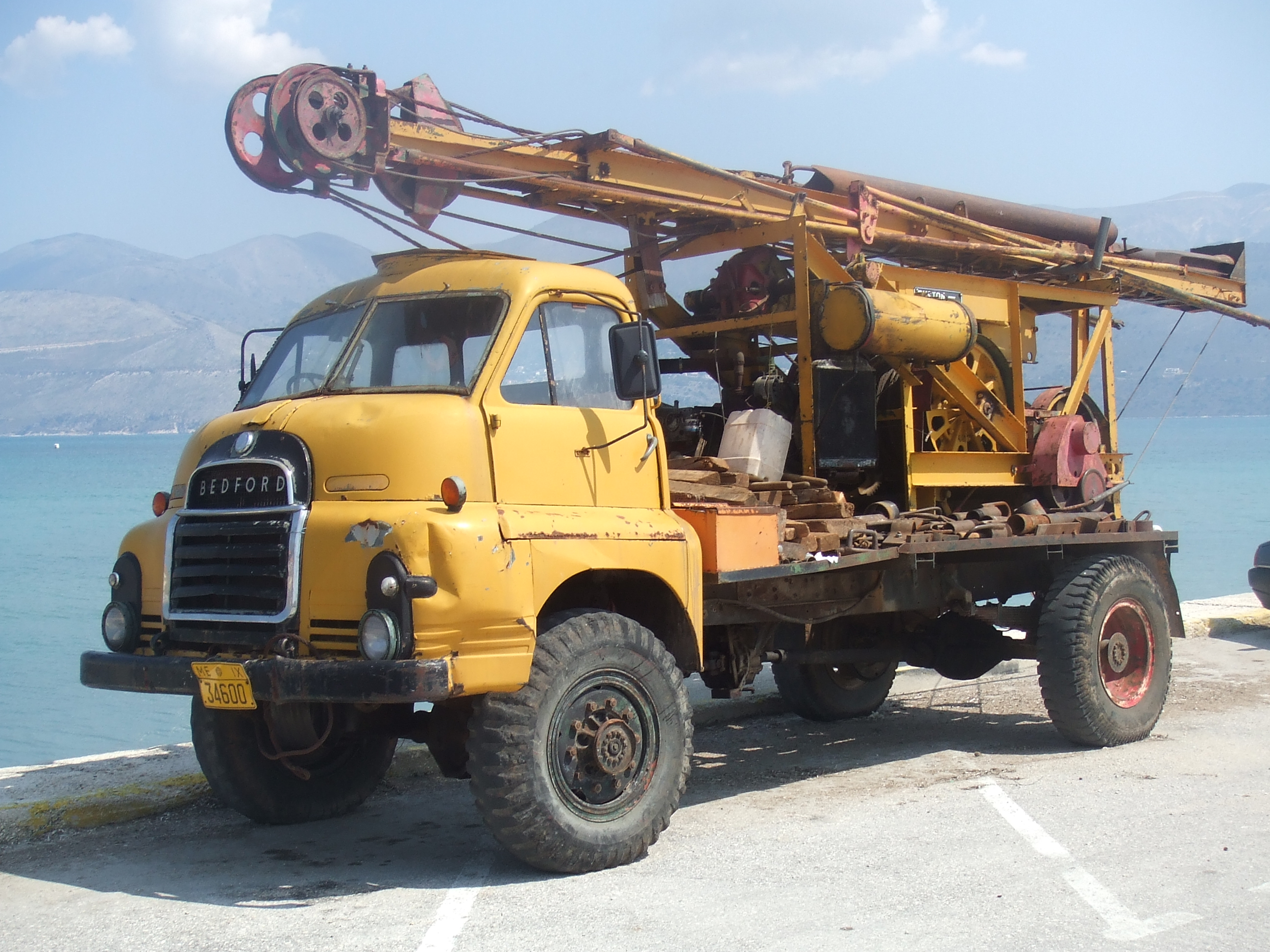
Bedford truck fitted with Ruston-Bucyrus drilling rig, in Lixouri, Greece

Ruston-Bucyrus No4 face shovel of 1931 at Great Dorset Steam Fair 2018

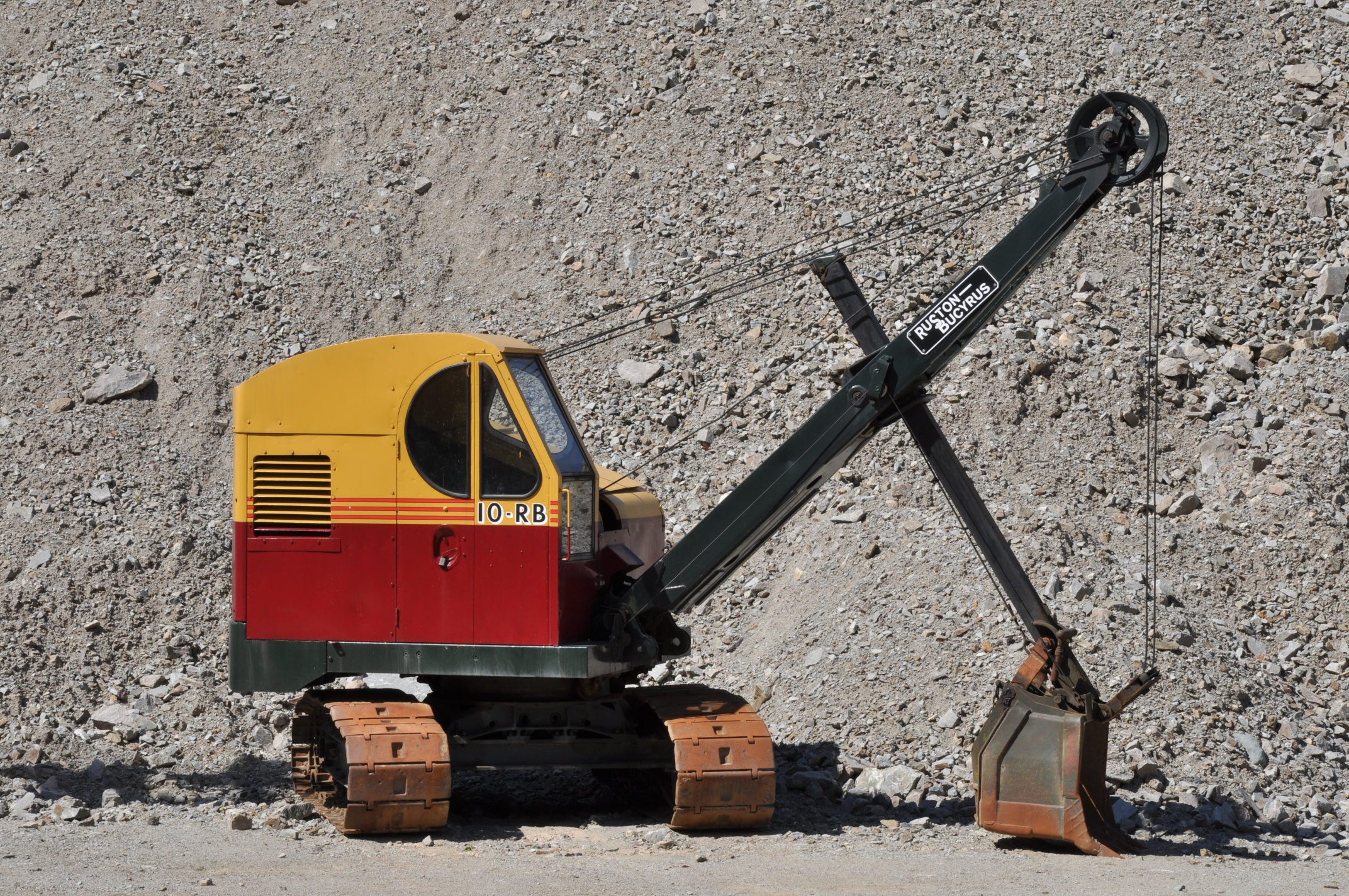
Ruston-Bucyrus 10-RB in the United Kingdom

Ruston-Bucyrus Ltd was an engineering company established in 1930 and jointly owned by Ruston & Hornsby based in Lincoln, England, and Bucyrus-Erie based in South Milwaukee, Wisconsin, the latter of which had operational control and into which the excavator manufacturing operation of Ruston & Hornsby was transferred. The Bucyrus company proper, from which the Bucyrus component of the Ruston-Bucyrus name was created, was an American company founded in 1880, in Bucyrus, Ohio.

During the Second World War, the company developed a trench-cutting machine known by the code name Cultivator No. 6 at the behest of Winston Churchill.

A limited company, Ruston-Bucyrus Ltd., was formed in 2005, by Paul and Frank Murray (Brothers) as co-directors. This has no ties to RB Cranes which holds all of the original machine information and drawings.

== Ruston-Bucyrus Ltd era ==
Gradually Universal Excavators designed by Bucyrus-Erie replaced Ruston & Hornsby designed models. The original range of standardised rope-operated machines included 10RB, 17RB, 19RB, and 33RB and were upgraded through some intermediate models including the 54RB to a main selling range in the 1960s of 22RB, 30RB, 38RB, 61RB, and 71RB. In addition, there were the large machines including the 110RB which evolved into the 150RB.

The 22RB was the most popular machine which was assembled on a production line basis.

The machine concept was a standard base to each model on which optional front-end equipment could be mounted with appropriate counterbalances, crawler track frames and minimal additional machinery. The most common variants included face shovel, dragline, lifting crane, and grabbing crane. Less common variants included drag shovel, skimmer and pile driver. Some cranes were also lorry-mounted. All machines had 360 degree rotation on a conical section roller path.

The machines were operated initially by a system of levers which operated toggle clutches into the drumshafts. Despite the significant power being transmitted, the lever system was, if set up correctly, relatively easy for the operator to use. The main control functions were later superseded by pneumatic control.

Most machines were fitted with diesel engines. The 22RB, typically, used a 6YDA Ruston & Hornsby engine. Electric motor options were available and often used on the large machines.

The model size, an elusively defined number, was possibly the standard face shovel capacity in cubic feet.

All the above machines were mounted on crawler tracks.

The company also manufactured walking draglines, which were very large capacity machines, model 5W the most common, with the upper machinery deck (on all excavators known as the revolving frame) mounted upon a circular tub with motion provided by overhanging cams with paddle feet which, when rotated, lifted the entire machine and produced individual steps of forward motion, a waddling action somewhat like a duck as the end of the boom would raise and lower. Because of the size and weight, walking draglines were transported to the worksite in sections and assembled there. These large machines were used for removal of overburden on, for example, opencast coal sites.

In the late 1960s, the Company designed a range of 360 degree hydraulic backactors (15H, 20H, and 30H) which were popular in the Far East and extended the life of the company.

In the early days of RB, they also produced a few other products including a range of lorry-mounted drilling rigs, primarily used for water bore holes. They also produced a design for a self-erecting tower crane in an era when tower cranes were rare.

In the 1960s, there used to be a bridge over the High Street in Lincoln stating that Ruston Bucyrus was the largest Excavator manufacturer in the World. The factory ran the length of Beevor Street, about 900m, apart from a short piece on the north side where a drivebelt manufacturing business was based. The grounds were up to 400m wide. There were more than 30 bays in the factory, most of which were about 150m long, nearly all fitted with overhead cranes. At the far end of the Works, there was an extra-large bay for assembly of the large machines including the 150RB and walking draglines. Beyond that was the testing area where cranes were taken for calibration. The company employed up to 2000 persons on the site with manufacturing on both day and night shifts. With exception of foundry work, virtually all manufacturing processes were completed on site. The machine shops used, for the period, the latest in technology including tape-programming and high-speed tipped tooling. There were eight service depots around the UK and a team of service engineers operated from the Lincoln Works to service international customers. Ruston Bucyrus cranes and excavators had been exported to most parts of the World.

The period of the smaller quarry excavator was lost when quarrying turned to more substantial blasting and the use of wheeled loaders.

== The R-B International era ==
In 1985, Ruston Bucyrus was bought by its management, severing all links with Bucyrus-Erie resulting in the formation of 'R-B Lincoln', which became R-B International, a subsidiary of Lincoln Industries (part of The Heather Corporation Ltd). Production of existing Ruston-Bucyrus designed cable excavator/crane models from the 22RB to the 71RB continued at the Lincoln factory with 'Improved Crane Dragline' versions also offered. From 1985 onwards, all new machines carried the 'RB' name instead of 'Ruston-Bucyrus', and in 1987, a new mechanical/hydraulic powered 51–60 model developed from the 38-RB was offered for use as a crane or dragline excavator In 1990, RB bought from its rival Priestman, the design and manufacturing rights to Priestman's Variable Counterbalance hydraulic/cable long reach excavator range and its extensive range of Grabs.

In 1992, RB introduced its CH series of fully hydraulic crane/dragline models with further models added in 1999. In 1996, R-B changed ownership in a buy-in management buy out, but in 2000, R-B International entered voluntary administration as a tough trading environment including a strong Pound and stiff competition from overseas competitors meant it could no longer continue as a going concern without a significant injection of capital.

== RB Cranes era ==
Having entered administration on 3 July 2000 and following unsuccessful attempts to sell the company to Daniel E. Davis, former president of Favelle Favco R-B International was sold to Langley Holdings plc as a going-concern on 22 December 2000 and a new company 'RB Cranes Ltd' was created.

A day earlier on 21 December 2000, Langley Holdings plc had acquired the material-handling division of Rolls-Royce PLC which became the Clarke Chapman Group comprising Cowans Sheldon, RB Cranes, Stothert & Pitt, Wellman Booth as its principal subsidiary companies. In January 2001, Clarke Chapman ceased production at RB's Lincoln works with production transferred to facilities in Retford and Gainsborough. Following a rationalisation of the RB product line, as of 2008, RB continue to offer the CH40, CH50, CH70, CH80, CH100, CH135, and CH135LJ Hydraulic Crawler Cranes, as well as specialist variants for Dockside usage RB also offer the CH E (Series CH50E & CH70E) for dragline and clamshell grab applications and the CH HD (Heavy Duty) (Series CH50D & CH70D) for adaption for piling and foundation engineering applications e.g. as a piling rig.

RB continues to offer four models of Variable Counterbalance hydraulic long reach excavators, the VC20-15, VC20-17, VC20-20, and VC20-22 and also continues to offer the RB Priestman range of grabs for excavation and material rehandling applications.

On 14 October 2009, the business RB Cranes was sold by Langley Holdings plc to Delden Cranes Limited, the business has been moved to Delden Cranes's premises in Selston, Nottinghamshire. The business will continue to service the complete range of RB machines, Priestman VC excavators and Priestman grabs in addition to the range of B-E (Bucyrus-Erie) up to 88B.

In February 2012, Delden Cranes acquired NCK Cranes, NCK the other major UK crane and excavator manufacturer.

== See also ==
- NCK
