= Ransomes & Rapier =

British railway equipment and crane manufacturer

Ransomes & Rapier Limited
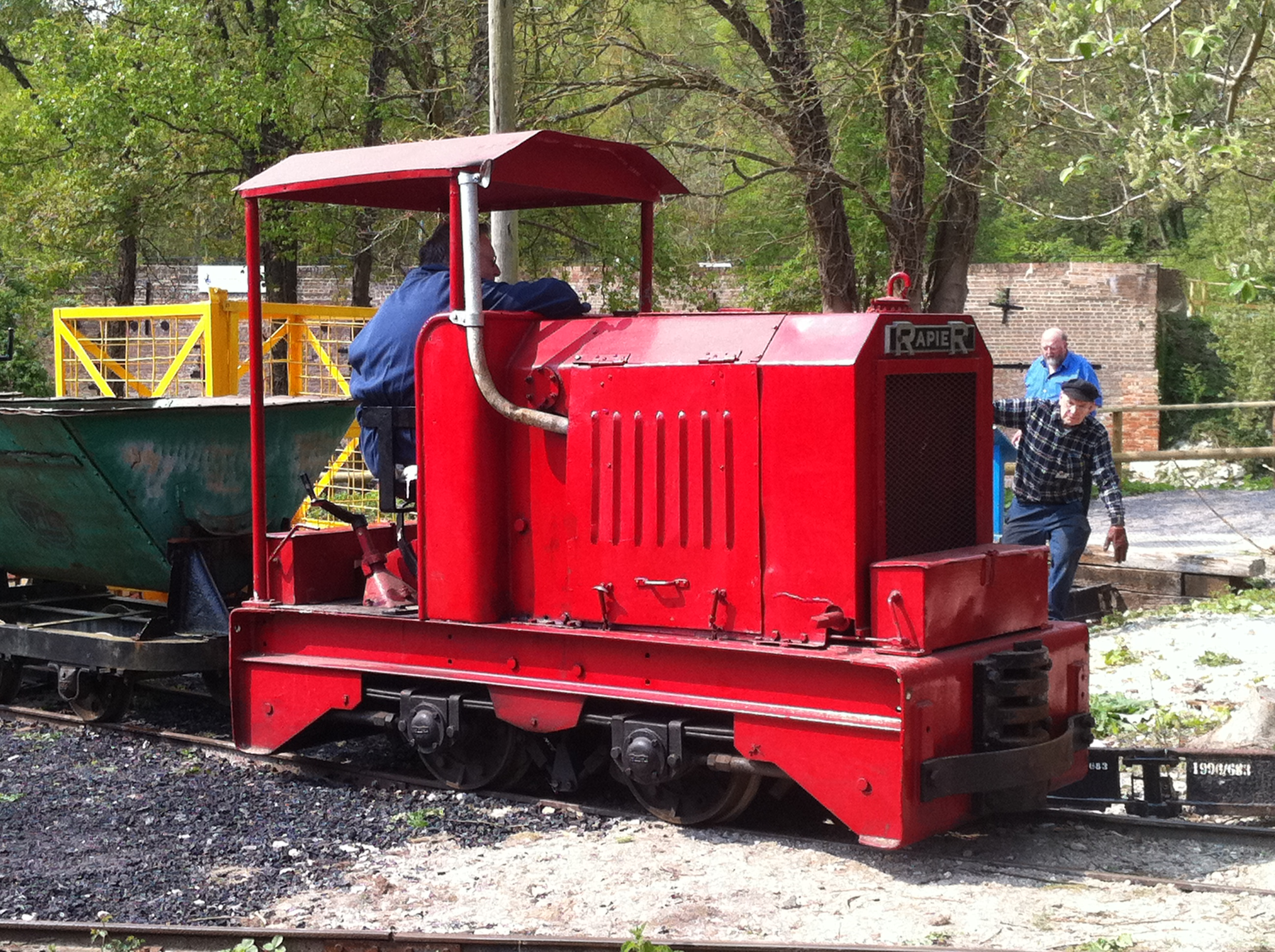
- Preserved Ransomes & Rapier narrow gauge diesel loco no. 80 at Amberley Museum & Heritage Centre.
- Type: plc
- Industry: Manufacturing
- Predecessor: Ransomes partnerships
- Founded: Subsidiary: 1789; 237 years ago Independent: 1869; 157 years ago
- Defunct: 1987
- Fate: Taken over by Newton, Chambers & Company; Sold patents to Bucyrus International
- Successor: Newton, Chambers & Company
- Headquarters: Waterside Works, Ipswich, England
- Key people: R. C. Rapier (1836–1897); Sir Wilfred Stokes
- Parent: Ransomes, Sims & Jefferies

Ransomes & Rapier was a major British manufacturer of railway equipment and later cranes, from 1869 to 1987. Originally an offshoot of the major engineering company Ransome's it was based at Waterside Works in Ipswich, Suffolk.

== Ransome's split ==
Ransomes & Rapier was formed in 1869 when four engineers, James Allen Ransome (1806–1875), his elder son, Robert James Ransome (c.1831–1891), Richard Christopher Rapier (1836–1897) and Arthur Alec Bennett (1842–1916), left the parent firm by agreement to establish a new firm on a site on the River Orwell to continue the business of manufacturing railway equipment and other heavy works.

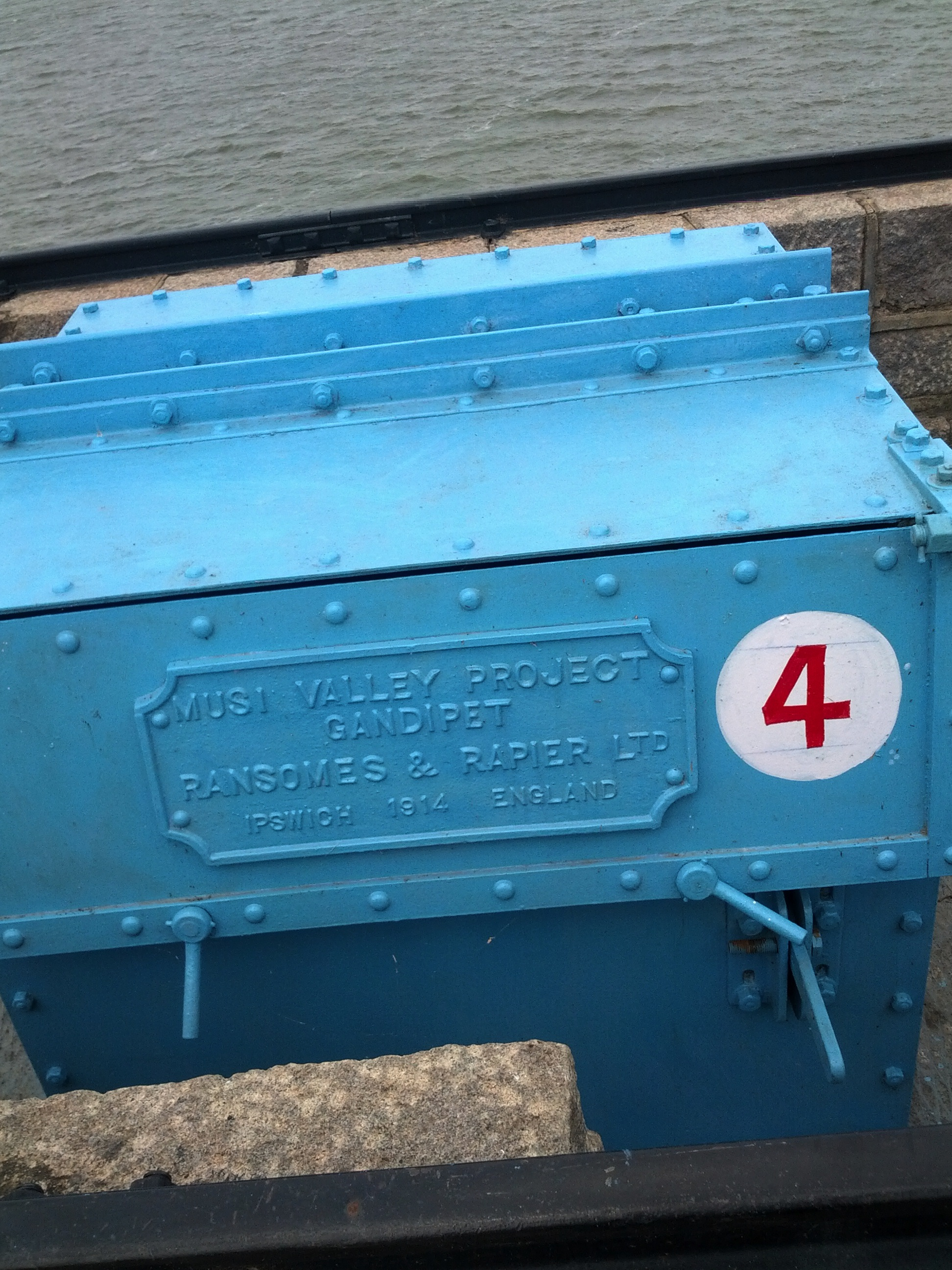
Gate 4 at the Musi Valley Project at Gandipet near Hyderabad, AP, India. The lake is popularly known as "Osman Sagar". The gates at the dam show they were made by Ransomes & Rapier in 1914 at Ipswich.

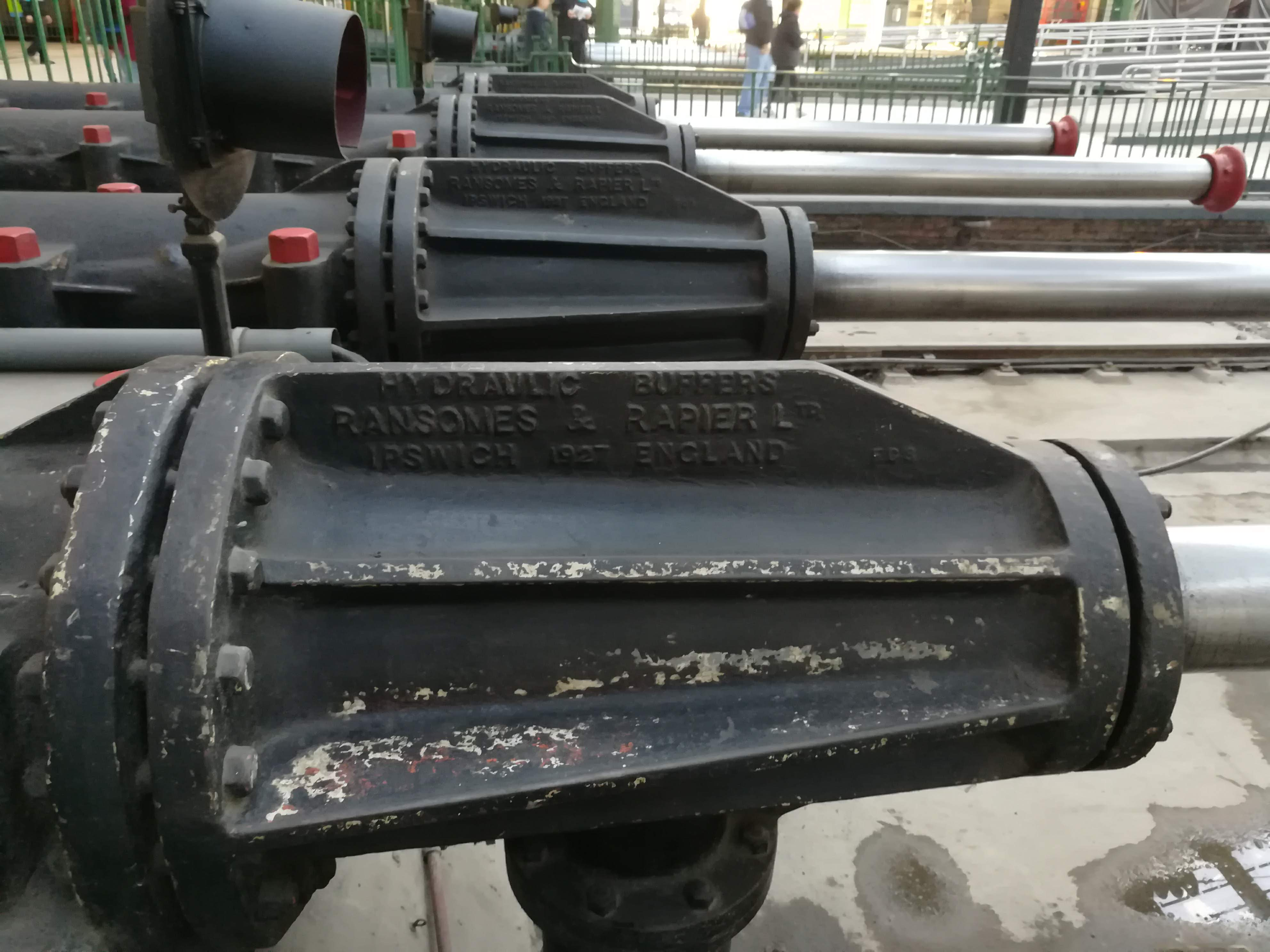
Buffer stops, still in operation, at Constitución railway station in Buenos Aires, Argentina, manufactured by Ransomes & Rapier in 1927 at Ipswich.

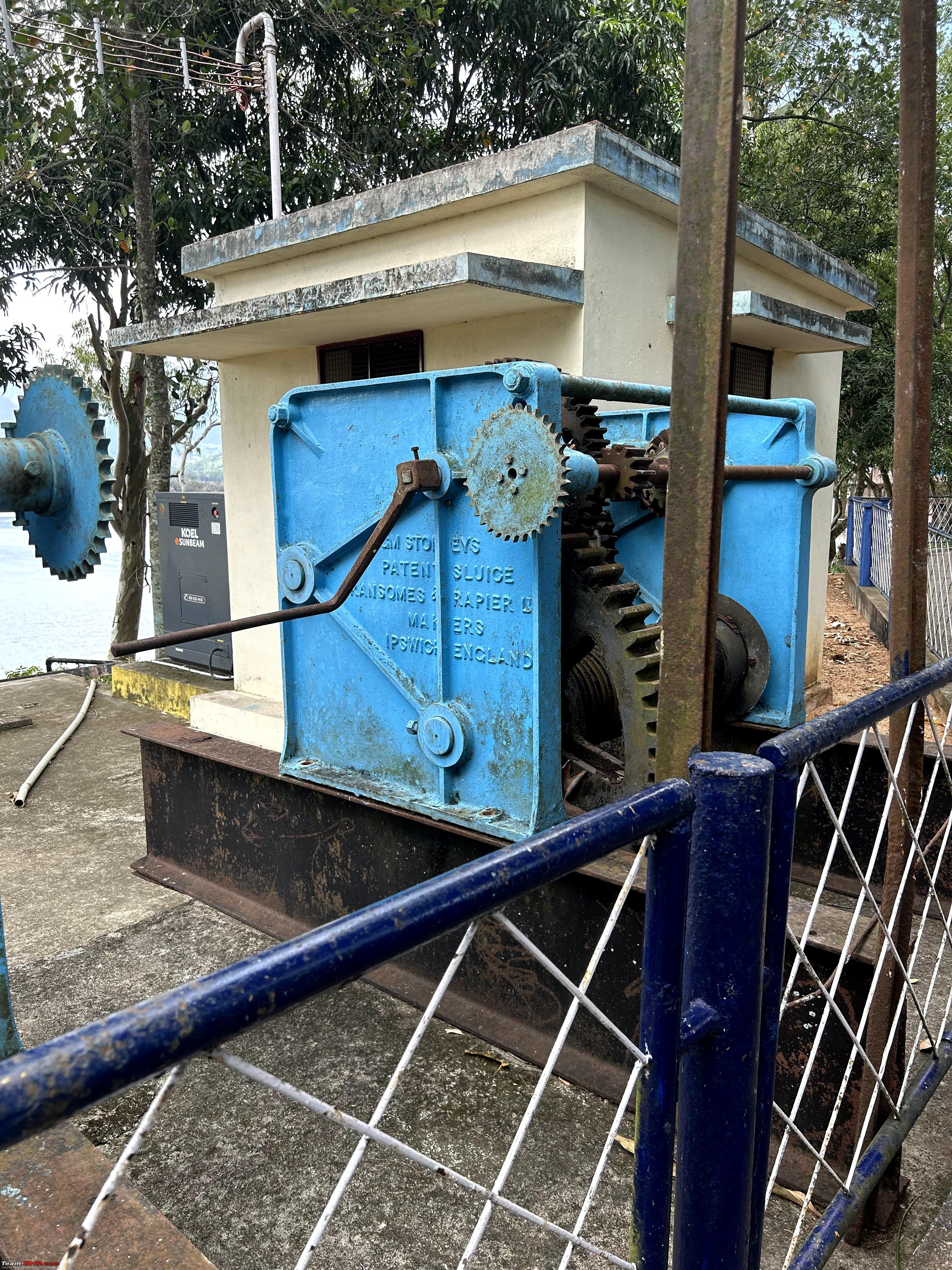
A Ransomes & Rapier Sluice in Pechiparai Reservoir, Tamil Nadu, India, installed in 1905.

The year before J. A. Ransome's younger son, Allen Ransome (1833–1913), founded the saw-milling machinery business, A. Ransome & Co, in Chelsea London with a foundry in Battersea. These businesses, transferred to Newark-on-Trent in 1900, led at the outset of World War I to Ransome & Marles now part of Nippon Seikō Kabushiki-kaisha.

R. C. Rapier had been head of Ransome's Orwell Works railway department since he joined the business in 1862. When the two businesses were split he became the engineering partner in the new firm known as Ransomes & Rapier at the Waterside Ironworks.

A limited liability company was incorporated to own the firm on 17 April 1896 using the same name with the addition of Limited (later plc): Ransomes & Rapier Limited.

=== The first railway in China ===
Rapier himself took the leading part in the 1875 negotiation and construction by Ransomes & Rapier of China's first railway, the Woosung Road (or Woosung Railway) from Shanghai to Wusong. The railway opened in 1876 but was dismantled by the local government the following year because it had not received the necessary approvals. The firm also supplied railway turntables in the early to mid-1930s.

During the First World War they produced shells, guns and tank turrets. The Stokes mortar was invented by managing director and chairman Sir Wilfred Stokes, knighted for the invention. His nephew Richard Rapier Stokes, MP was also managing director.

The company merged with Newton, Chambers & Company of Sheffield and formed the NCK excavator division to form NCK-Rapier who built walking draglines used in opencast mining.

Ransomes & Rapier built the model W1400 walking dragline called Sundew for The United Steel Company iron ore quarry at Exton Park, Rutland, England. At the time it was built in 1951, it was the largest in the world, weighing in at 1880 tons.

Ransomes & Rapier sold the right to their walking dragline technology and patents to Bucyrus International in 1988.

The turntable used to turn the revolving restaurant on the BT Tower was also built by Ransomes & Rapier.

=== Water diverting hydraulic system Gates in Bhavnagar-Gujarat-India ===
The Bhikada Canal water diverting hydraulic system gates were also constructed in the year 1937 by Ransomes & Rapier Company of England to divert the Khokhara Hills Water to Gaurishankar Sarovar (Bortalav lake) of Bhavnagar city of Gujarat State India. The 24 gates are working successfully as of 2022.

Ransomes & Rapier closed in 1987.

== See also ==
- Francis Goold Morony Stoney (1837–1897) appointed works manager in 1887
- Sir Wilfred Stokes (1860–1927) assistant to R. C. Rapier later chairman and managing director of Ransomes & Rapier
- Richard Stokes (1897–1957) chairman and managing director of Ransomes & Rapier, grandson of R. C. Rapier, nephew of W. Stokes.
- NCK

== Bibliography ==
- Ransomes Sims & Jefferies: Agricultural Engineers - Brian Bell, Old Pond Publishing Ltd (2001), ISBN 1-903366-15-1
