= LeTourneau Technologies =

American manufacturer (1929–2011)

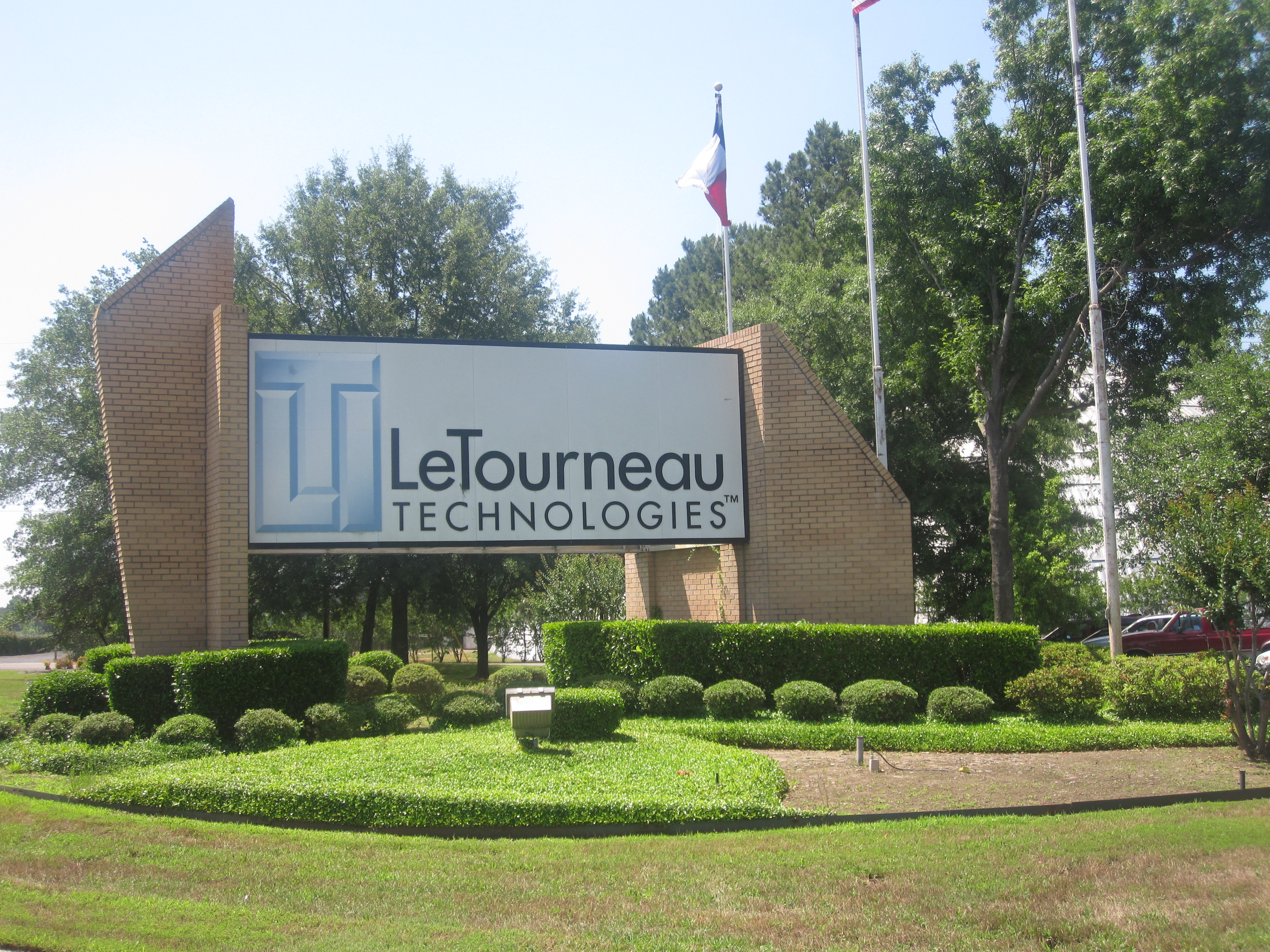
- Manufacturing unit in Longview, TX
- Formerly: R.G. LeTourneau, Inc.
- Industry: Heavy equipment; Construction; Mining; Forestry; Military technology
- Founded: California 1929
- Founder: R.G. LeTourneau
- Headquarters: Longview, TX
- Area served: Worldwide
- Products: Bulldozers; Wheel tractor-scraper; Motor graders; Wheel loaders; Jackup rig; Overland Train; Military engineering vehicle; Electric Vehicle; Electric wheel-drive

LeTourneau Technologies, Inc. was an American manufacturer of heavy construction equipment founded by R. G. LeTourneau. In 2011, the company was acquired by Joy Global.

== History ==
R. G. LeTourneau who worked as contractor for years figured out that the equipment he used were not efficient enough. To solve the problem he acquired land in Stockton, California to study and engineer the design of scraper to improve it alongside contracting. By 1933 he stopped taking contracts and focused mainly on manufacturing. Later he formed a venture with Caterpillar Tractor to develop a factory in Peoria, Illinois which would manufacture attachments, scrapers and wagons for use with Cat crawler tractors. As a result they managed to set up four factories two in America, one in Georgia and Australia to meet the demand after the Peoria one.

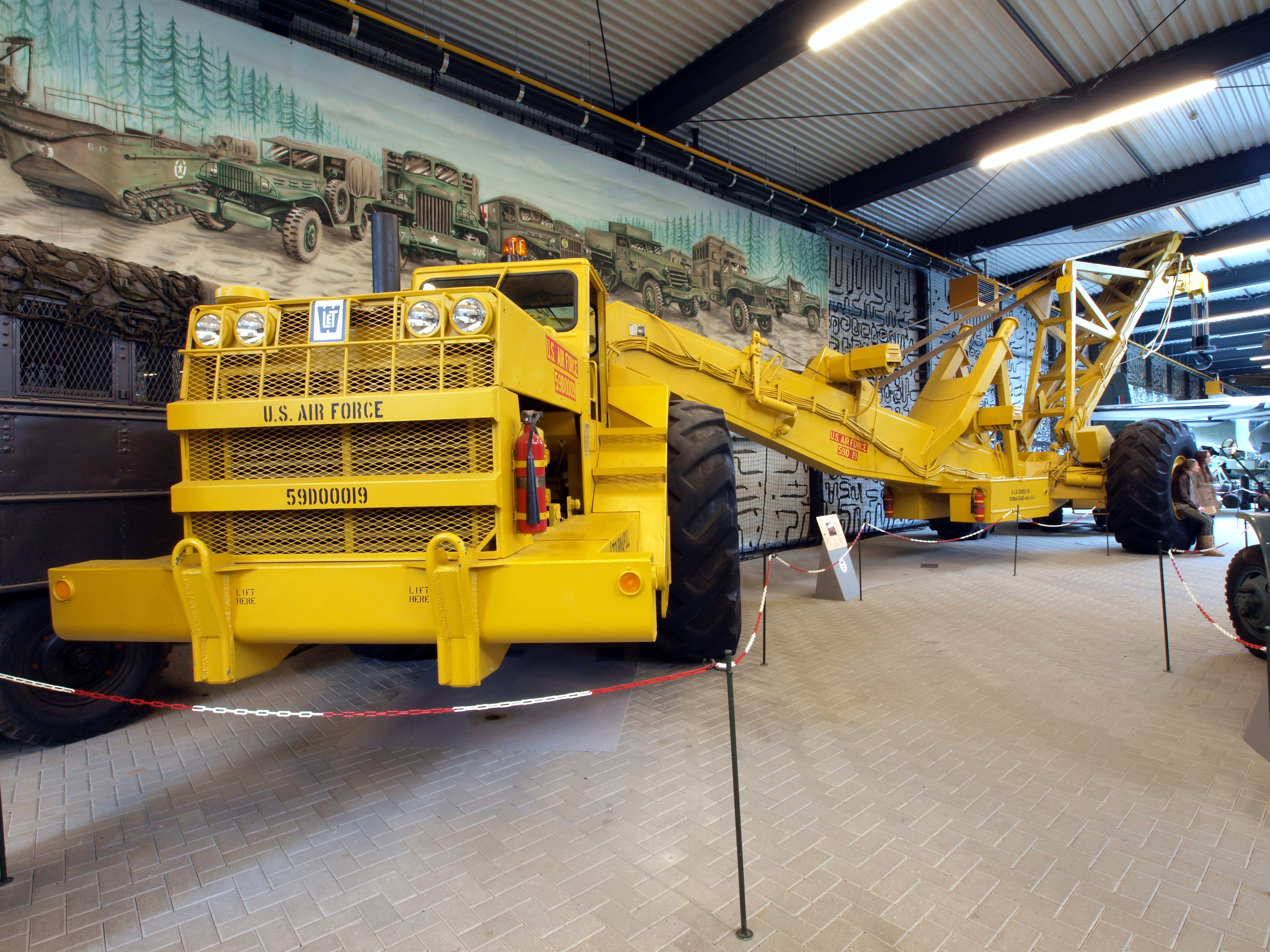
A preserved US Airforce Tournacrane in Overloon War Museum

=== World War II ===
During World War II Caterpillar's relations with the US Defense Force helped Caterpillar to get huge orders for tractors which meant huge orders for LeTourneau attachments and accessories. LeTourneau supplied thousands of bulldozers, Carryalls (wagons to load and carry various equipment), sheepsfoot compactors, rooters, Tournapull (two wheeled tractors to pull Carryall wagons) and Tournacranes (pick and carry crane). The proximity of the Caterpillar Tractor Plant and LeTourneau plant in Peoria helped them become one of the biggest machinery suppliers of the US Military.

After the war in 1945 the joint venture contract between Caterpillar and LeTourneau ended but after that LeTourneau was one of the competitors for Caterpillar, so Caterpillar started to manufacture its own products which were earlier manufactured by LeTourneau. With wide dealership network Caterpillar dominated the segment which resulted in LeTourneau earth moving business being sold in 1953 to Westinghouse Air Brake Company (WABCO), a Pennsylvania based brake manufacturer.

== Earth Moving division ==
After the sale of the earth moving division to WABCO the company was renamed to LeTourneau-Westinghouse. At the time of sale the founder of the company entered into a five-year competitive clause which ended in 1957 the same year the founder R.G. LeTourneau re-entered into the segment of earthmoving equipments with new technology and products.

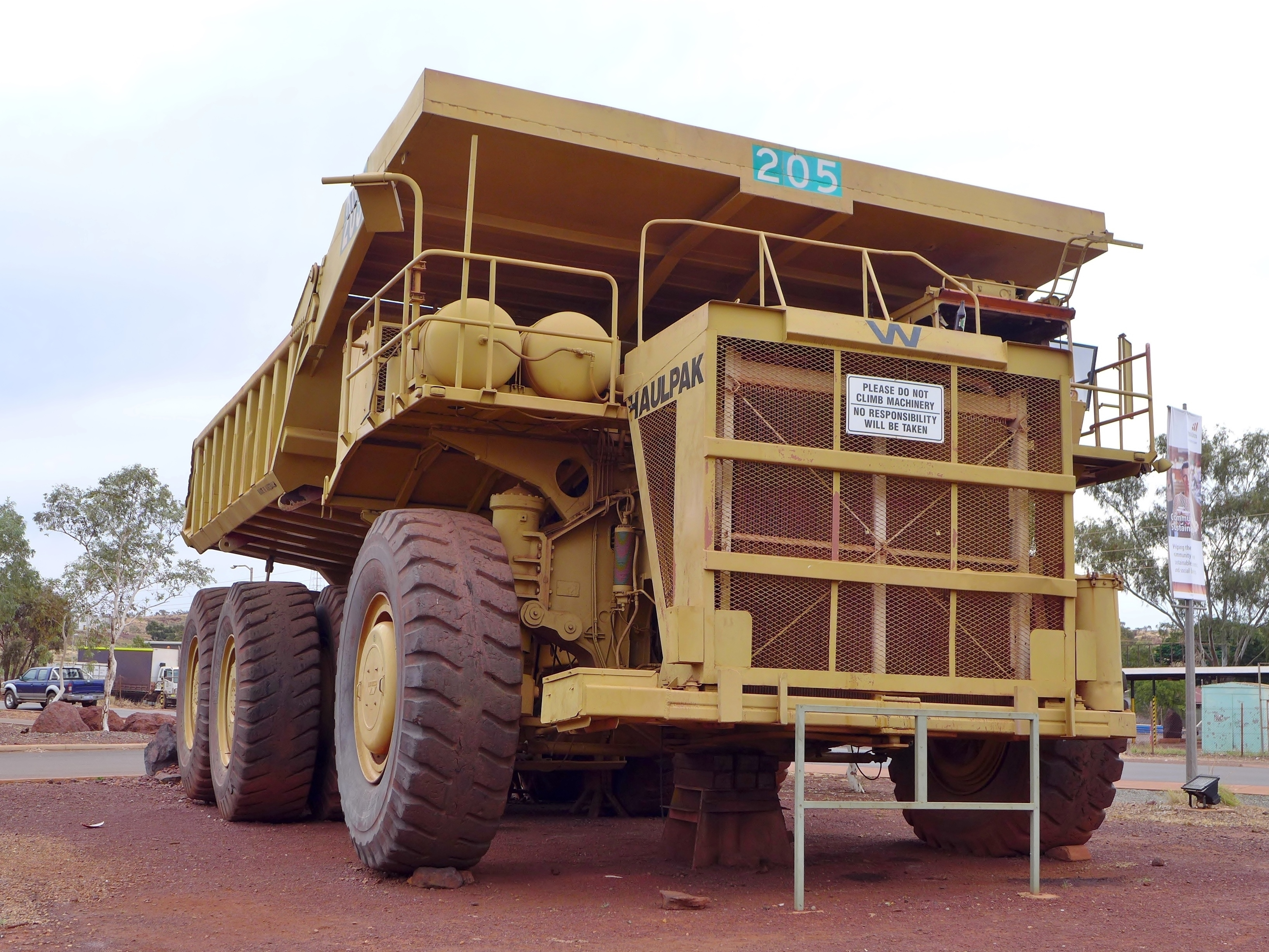
WABCO Haulpak dump truck at Newman Visitor Centre in Western Australia.

=== Dump Trucks ===
After the acquisition in 1953 the new company had only one mining dump truck the Tournarocker (worlds first articulated dump truck) from the previous company. To fill the gap the company hired Ralph Kress in 1955 to design new off-road dump trucks at their Peoria plant. In 1956 the company launched its first off-road dump truck LW-30 it was a 20 ton capacity rear dump truck next year in 1957 company came up with the Haulpak lineup of dump trucks which introduced as 35 ton dump trucks later grew to 65 tons very quickly. With high sales and demand for the Haulpak the company lost its focus on other products of the previous company like the loader and scraper.

In 1968 the company was acquired by American Standard Inc. which developed bigger versions of the truck lineup to 100 plus tons and even electric versions later in 1984 the Haulpak lineup was sold to Dresser Industries a Dallas based multinational corporation by 1988 Komatsu America Corp. and Dresser Industries went into a joint venture named Komatsu Dresser Company and by the 1994 Komatsu gained full control over the venture Haulpak branding lasted till 1999.

== Heavy machinery division ==
During the five-year competitive clause from 1953-1957 LeTourneau focused on perfecting and implementing his diesel–electric powertrain for his multi wheeled heavy machinery which was similar to the setup seen on locomotives. The power was produced from a diesel combustion engine which would spin an electric generator transfers electric power to hub motors of each wheel. This setup was capable of powering multiple wheels without differentials, drive shafts, or the drivetrain which resulted in low energy loss in transfers. The design was considered generations ahead of the Thomas Poulter’s futuristic Antarctic Snow Cruiser.

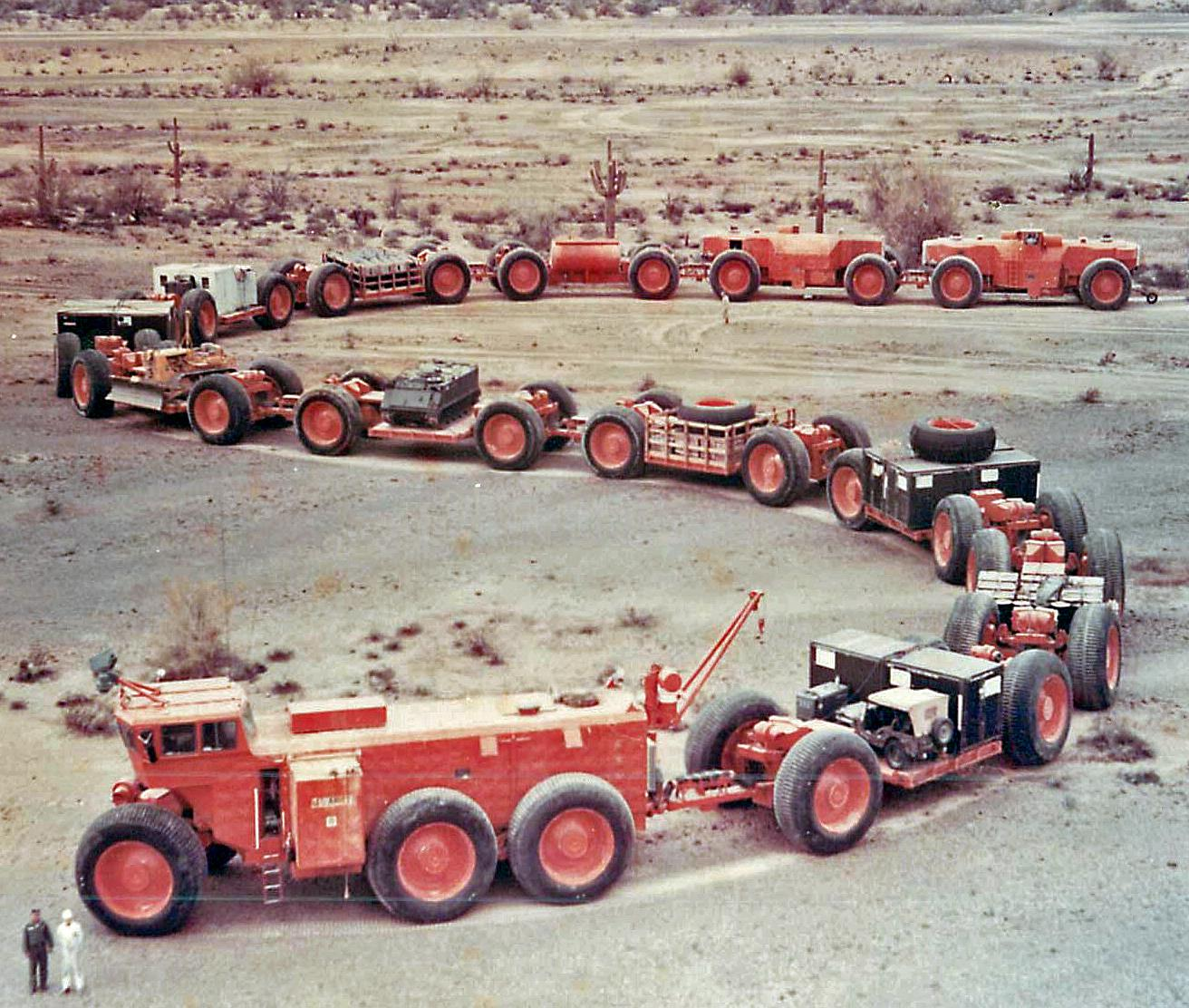
TC-497 Overland Train, Mk II being tested in Yuma Proving Ground, Arizona

=== Overland Trains ===
For the Distant Early Warning Line (DEW line) project, Western Electric and Alaska Freightlines, with the help of TRADCOM (U.S. Army Transportation Research and Development Command), contracted to have a pair of Overland trains, the TC-264 Sno-Buggy, designed specifically for Arctic conditions, to be built by LeTourneau Technologies. The TC-264 Sno-Buggy was the longest off-road vehicle ever built at the time, with its six cars (including the locomotive) measuring a total of 274 feet. Each car was driven by four 7.3 foot-tall wheels and tires. The 24-wheel-drive was powered by two 400 horsepower Cummins diesel engines connected to a hub motor. It had a payload capacity of 150 tons, and could traverse nearly any terrain. It had a very successful first season hauling freight to the DEW Line.

=== Drilling rigs ===
R. G. LeTourneau visioned to build a mobile drilling platform which could overcome the huge cost and time of foundation and relocation a drilling rig in waters. After years of engineering and studies LeTourneau came up with a concept of a barge mobile platform supported by tripod type system which he proposed to Zapata Corporation, a Rochester based oil company headed by future president of America George H. W. Bush. In 1954 Zapata contracted LeTourneau to construct the first ever jack up drilling rig and the construction started by the end of the year on the shores of the Mississippi River next to their Vicksburg plant.

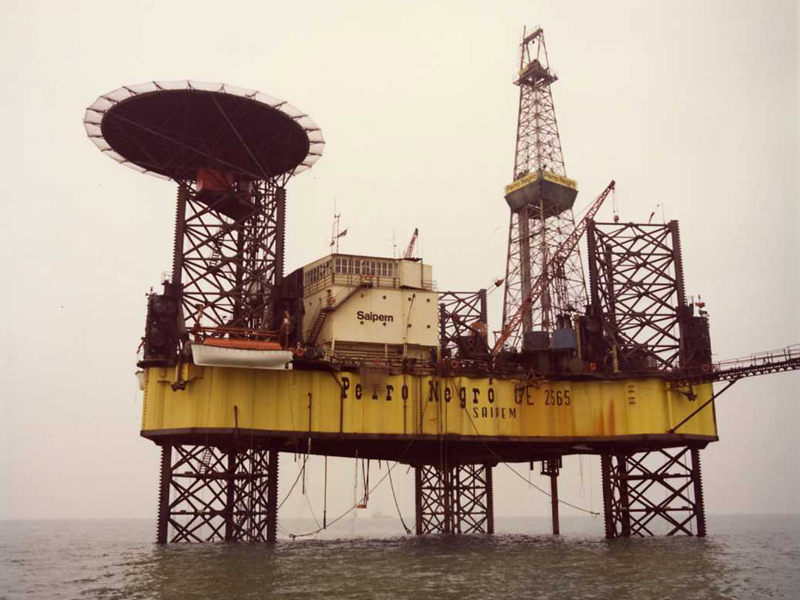
Saipem SPA Perro Negro 4 drilling rig in Ravenna

The platform was large barge supported by three electro-mechanically-operated lattice legs which helps the structure to walk into the Mississippi River with its 4000 ton weight after the successful walk of the platform other equipments and drilling pumps were installed and handed over to Zapata at its christening ceremony where R G LeTourneau handed 3-ft “Key to the Gulf” to Zapata’s president, George Bush in 1956. Scorpion the drilling rig took off to its first service from Port Aransas, Texas to drill a well for Standard Oil Company of Texas. Soon after Scorpion LeTourneau delivered a second jack up drilling rig the Vinegaroon in 1957 to Zapata.

== After the death of R. G. LeTourneau ==
After the death of R. G. LeTourneau in 1969 the company was acquired by Marathon manufacturing company which renamed it to Marathon LeTourneau Company for decade the company boomed its rig business and acquiring shipyards in Brownsville, Texas and Singapore. The company also acquired the John Brown & Company yard in Clydebank, Scotland. In 1979 the company was sold to Penn Central Corporation which was later sold to General Cable Corp.

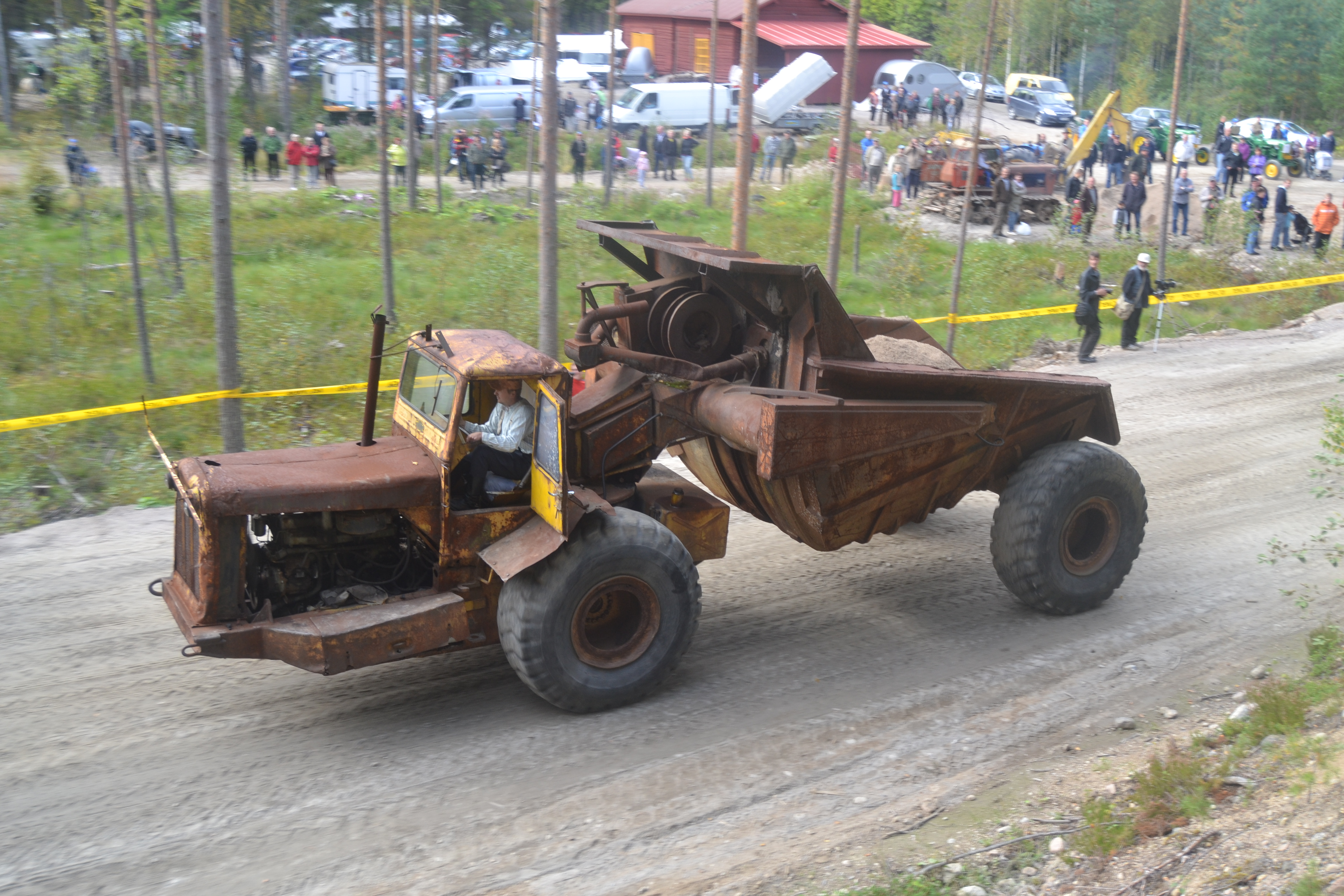
Model C Tournarocker in Laukaa, Finland

In 1994, Rowan (now Valaris Limited), which had used the company to manufacture its drilling rigs, acquired the company from General Cable for $50 million.

In 2011, Rowan (now Valaris Limited) sold LeTourneau Technologies to Joy Global. Joy Global subsequently sold LeTourneau's Drilling, Marine, and Power divisions to Cameron International.

In 2016, Keppel Corporation acquired LeTourneau Offshore Products (jackups, cranes, and elevating units) from Cameron, while Cameron retained the LeTourneau Drilling Products division. The new company operates as Keppel LeTourneau and has offices in the United States, United Arab Emirates and Singapore.

In 2017 Joy Global was acquired by Komatsu America Corp subsidiary of Komatsu Ltd which also bought the earth moving division from Dresser Industries. Joy Global shares were delisted from the New York Stock Exchange after the deal and formation of new company was formed from Joy called Komatsu Mining Corporation, headquartered in Milwaukee, which will have Komatsu, P&H, Joy and Montabert products in its portfolio.

== See also ==
- Overland Train
- Westinghouse Air Brake Company
- Dresser Industries
- Komatsu America Corp.
- Valaris Limited
- Joy Global
- Keppel Corporation
