= Chain Belt Company =

19th-century US equipment manufacturer

- Industry: Agricultural equipment
- Founded: Milwaukee, Wisconsin 1892
- Headquarters: U.S.
- Key people: Christopher W. LeValley
- Products: Chain belts

Chain Belt Company was an agricultural equipment manufacturer in the US. It produced chain belts specifically to replace leather-based belts, which were used inside engine-powered agricultural equipment at the time.

== History ==
The company was established in Milwaukee, Wisconsin, by inventor Christopher W. LeValley, who also went by C.W. Levalley, and two foundry operators, that provided him with $11,000.00 in starting capital, F.W. Sivyer and W.A. Draves. It was incorporated on February 20, 1892. The company applied the concept of chain belts on farm machinery to construction machinery and conveying equipment. Its building was formerly owned by Alonzo Pawling and Henry Harnischfeger of Pawling & Harnischfeger, which eventually became Harnischfeger Corporation.

In the 1890s the company manufactured chain-driven material handling conveyors and bucket elevators for Milwaukee breweries such as the Joseph Schlitz Brewing Company. By 1894 the company began to develop international markets, exporting chains to Europe and opening a sales office in England.

By 1913 annual sales reached $1 million. At that time the company's products were organized into three major divisions: chain products for power transmission; chain-driven construction machinery; and chain-powered bulk conveying equipment.

In 1914 it introduced the Rex brand-name, which was first used on a chain-driven concrete mixer. It soon became a widely recognized trademark.

In 1923, C.R. Messinger of Chain Belt Company served as President of the American Foundry Society for a one-year term.

In 1941 it won the combined Army and Navy Award for Excellence in War Production.

By 1943 it was manufacturing: Rex Chain, Rex Concrete Mixers, Rex Sprockets, Rex Traveling Water Screens, Rex Elevators, and Rex Conveyors and was working on conveyor for chemicals.

By 1944 it was producing rifles, howitzers, anti-aircraft guns (rifles), tank turrets, ammunition hoists for navy vessels and turrets, tracks and gunshields for Alligator armored vehicles.

By 1959 its business was involved in four distinct categories: Construction Machinery, Heavy Bulk Material Handling Systems, Mechanical Power Transmission, Sanitation and Industrial Waste Treatment Equipment.

In 1964 the company changed its name to Rex Chainbelt, Inc. Nordberg Manufacturing Company was acquired in 1970, and in 1973 the company name changed to Rexnord.

In October 2016, Rexnord announced plans to move its bearings manufacturing plant, with its 300 union jobs and 75-80 supervisory jobs, from Indianapolis, Indiana, to Monterrey, Mexico, in June 2017. President-elect Donald Trump criticized Rexnord for firing 300-plus American employees, via Twitter on December 2, 2016.
