= P&H Mining =

Equipment manufacturer

P&H Mining Equipment Inc.
- Company type: Subsidiary (Parent: Komatsu Limited, following acquisition of Joy Global)
- Industry: Mining
- Founded: 1884
- Headquarters: Milwaukee, Wisconsin
- Key people: Randy W. Baker, President & COO
- Products: Electric Mining Shovel; Draglines; Blast Hole Drills
- Number of employees: 2,600 P&H Mining Equipment and P&H MinePro Services combined
- Website: P&H Mining.com bad link

P&H Mining Equipment sells drilling and material handling machinery under the "P&H" trademark. The firm is an operating subsidiary of Joy Global Inc. In 2017 Joy Global Inc. was acquired by Komatsu Limited of Tokyo, Japan, and is now known as Komatsu Mining Corporation and operates as a subsidiary of Komatsu.

Joy Global Inc. (JGI) is a mining machinery and service support company based in Milwaukee, Wisconsin, USA. It consists of two operating units – P&H Mining Equipment and Joy Mining Machinery. P&H Mining Equipment specializes in the design, manufacture and support of equipment applied to surface mines. Joy Mining Machinery specializes in equipment and support applied to underground mine operations.

== P&H Mining Equipment history ==
Industrial artisans Alonzo Pawling and Henry Harnischfeger started the manufacturing business that would evolve into P&H Mining Equipment in 1884 in Milwaukee, Wisconsin, USA.

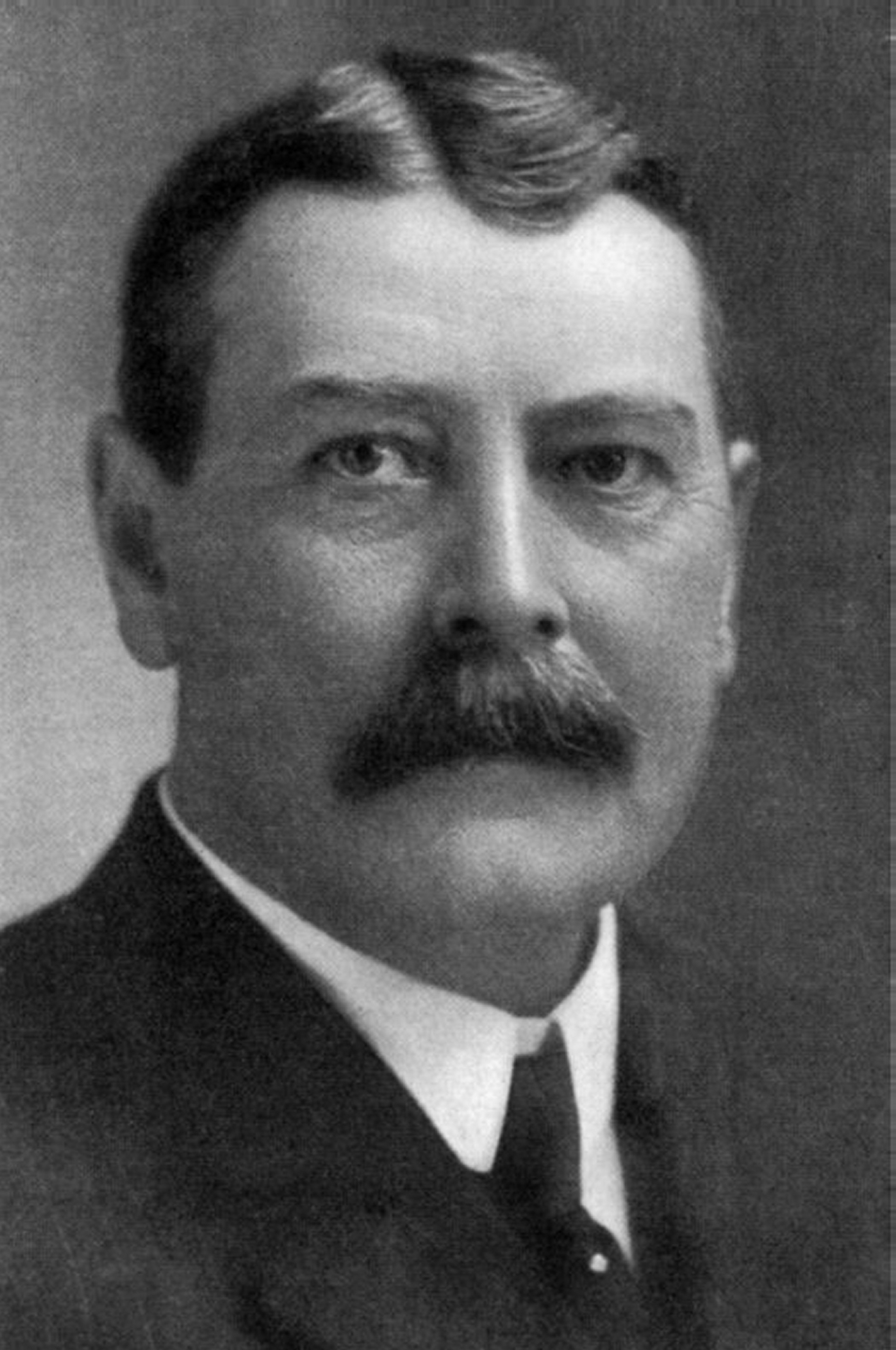
Alonzo Pawling.

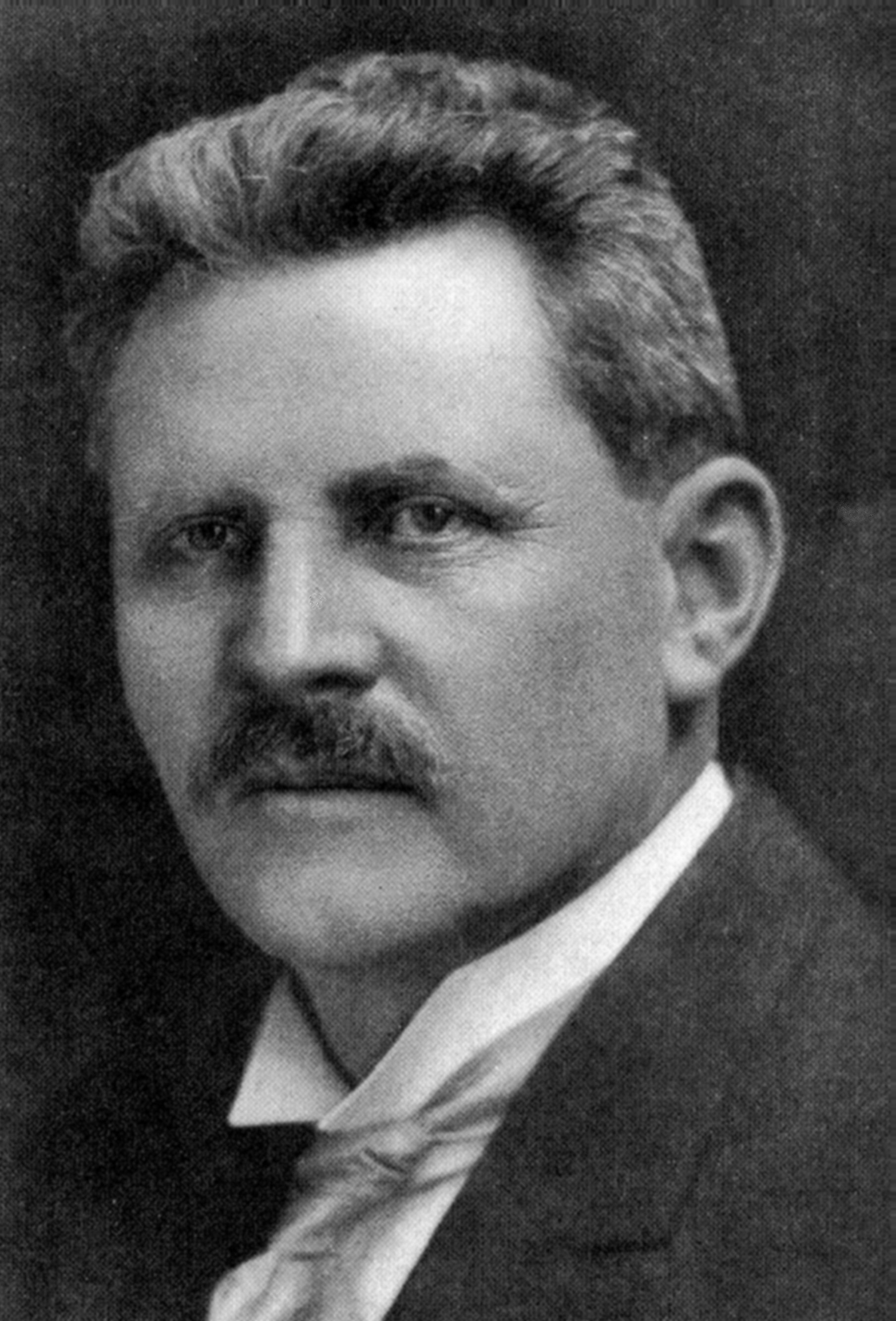
Henry Harnischfeger.

Pawling was a castings pattern maker. Harnischfeger was a locksmith machinist with some engineering training. Both individuals served within the Whitehill Sewing Machine Company factory in Milwaukee starting in 1881. Concerned that Whitehill business operations were drifting toward failure, Pawling exited the firm to start a small gear machining and pattern making shop in 1883. Needing more gear machining expertise and capital, Pawling persuaded Harnischfeger to join his firm as an equal partner. Their Pawling & Harnischfeger Machine and Pattern Shop officially began on December 1, 1884.

== Components and assemblies suppliers ==
Pawling and Harnischfeger initially supplied industrial machinery components and assembly service support to large manufacturing operations in Milwaukee. Their customers included industrial knitting machine manufacturers, brick makers, grain drying equipment manufacturers and beer brewers. When an overloaded overhead bridge-type crane collapsed within the foundry operations of a nearby heavy equipment manufacturer known as the Edward P. Allis Manufacturing Company, Pawling and Harnischfeger rebuilt the crane with an improved and simplified design.

Pawling & Harnischfeger soon transformed their business into an industrial cranes manufacturing and service operation. A bank panic in 1893 caused demand for cranes to plummet however, prompting P&H to look for another product line that might help them reduce business risk amid economic downturns. They turned their attention to earth moving machinery, as America was in the midst of an infrastructure and construction boom that required large volumes of such equipment.

== Earth Moving Machinery Era Begins ==
By 1920 the P&H digging machinery product line included P&H Model 206 and Model 300 machines that the firm produced in batches of five or more. By 1926, P&H digging machinery was effectively in distribution around the world including Mumbai, India.

== Products Evolve ==
Over the ensuing decades, P&H earth moving machines evolved into larger, more powerful and more productive prime movers of material. By 1930, welding technology made possible the fabrication of lighter, stronger machinery versus traditional riveted-design machinery. P&H not only was an early adapter to welded design, but the firm also designed and manufactured its own line of electric arc welding machinery and welding rod products. Another technology advance applied to P&H digging machines during the 1930s was the Ward-Leonard DC electric motor drive system. Pawling & Harnischfeger began designing and making their own electric motors and controls starting in 1893 when they acquired assets of the Gibb Electric Company that were not needed when Gibb was purchased by Westinghouse Electric Manufacturing Company.

P&H shovels and draglines were originally available with prime-mover options including a Waukesha gasoline engine, a Buda diesel engine, or a P&H electric motor. By the 1930s, diesel engines and P&H electric motors became the dominant prime mover options on P&H digging machines. By the end of the 1960s, virtually all P&H excavating machines would be equipped with P&H electric motors.

P&H excavators that started out in the 1920s with dipper and bucket payloads of about 500 pounds / 226 kilograms and dipper and bucket capacities of 0.5 cubic yard / 0.382 cubic meter would evolve into massive and powerful electric mining shovels with maximum dipper payloads of 120 tons / 109 tonnes and maximum capacities of 82 cubic yards / 62.7 cubic meters. Machine working weights would see similar dramatic changes. P&H Model 206 excavators originally had working weights of about 25 tons / 22.7 tonnes. P&H 4100XPC electric shovels today have working weights of about 1,645 tons / 1492 tonnes.

== P&H Product Line ==
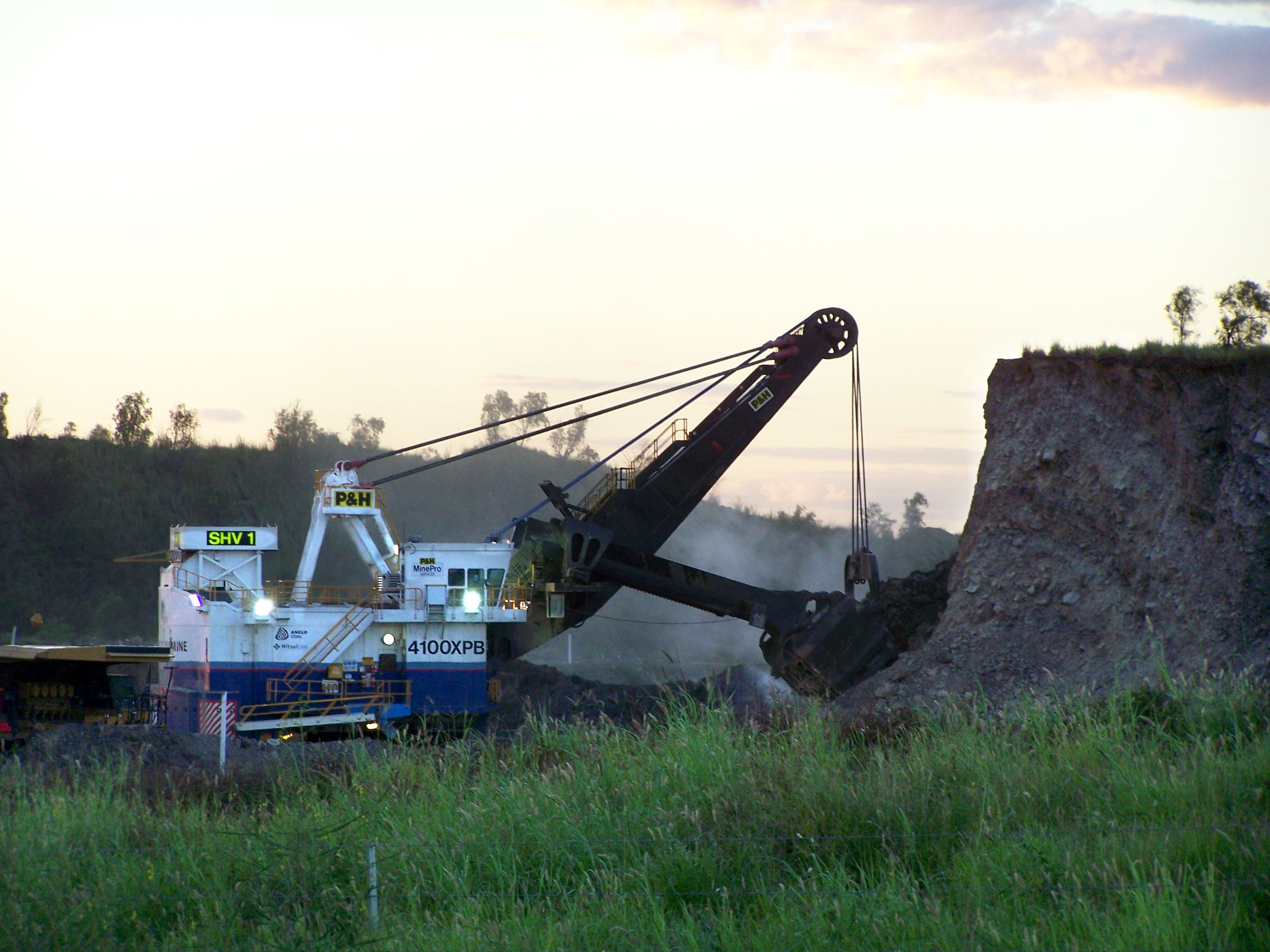
A P&H 4100XPB Shovel in Queensland, Australia

P&H Mining Equipment sells four lines of equipment for surface mining operations. They include electric mining shovels, blast hole production drills, walking draglines, and in-pit crushing-conveying systems.

=== Electric Mining Shovels ===
P&H Electric Mining Shovels are applied to loading haul trucks and in-pit crusher-conveyor systems in surface mine operations. They range in payload from 21 tons / 19.1 tonnes for the smallest model, the P&H 1900AL, to 120 tons / 108.9 tonnes for the model P&H 4100XPC. From March 2018 the new superior model: P&H Komatsu 4800XPC. The productions are 20% increased and this machinery has a lower cost per ton by up to 10% compared to other rope shovels: nominal payload 122.5 tonnes; optimum truck size: 360mt. - 400st; operator eye level 33 ft. 1 in (10.1 mt.)

=== Drilling Rigs ===
P&H Drilling Rigs are applied to boring grids of tubular explosives containers in hard-rock formations within mine operations. They apply three kinds of force to the task of advancing a tri-cone drill bit into rock. Bit-loading force up to 150,000 pounds-force (670,000 N) combines with up to 25,000-foot-pound-force (34,000 N⋅m) of torque and large volumes of compressed air flowing at nearly 3,850 cubic feet (109 m^{3}) per minute create the tubes or "blast holes." The holes are loaded with explosives and then detonated. The blast produces a powerful shock wave that fragments the rock, making it easier to load, haul, crush and distill for its mineral contents.

=== Walking Draglines ===
P&H Walking Draglines move large volumes of earthen overburden capping coal seams, and also overburden and phosphates. They wield a large-volume bucket that is cast out toward the material that needs to be relocated using a football field-length boom and powerful swing motors and transmissions. The bucket lands atop the material and its teeth quickly bite into the material. Powerful drag force is applied to fill the bucket, followed by powerful hoist and swing forces applied to dump the material away from the excavation site to. P&H dragline bucket capacities range from 55 to 160 cubic yards (42 to 122 m^{3}).

=== In-pit Crushing-Conveying Systems ===
In-pit Crushing-Conveying Systems (IPCCs) were introduced in 2008, which take earthen material excavated and deposited into a large holding hopper by an electric shovel, and then crush the material to an easy-to-convey size for transfer elsewhere in the mine. Soaring and volatile mine material handling costs associated with older mine operations utilizing longer and deeper truck haulage routes experienced during an inflationary period between 2004 and 2008 led to efforts by several mining equipment suppliers to develop alternative IPCC systems.

== Product distribution and support ==
P&H Mining Equipment operates a global network of P&H MinePro services support teams in key mining regions, formally established in 1996.

MinePro operations are located in Africa, Asia, Australia, Europe, North America and South America close to major concentrations of mining operations that produce energy and minerals for the global economy. P&H equipment and MinePro support are primarily directed to copper, coal, iron ore, oil sand, gold, diamonds and phosphate mining operations in order of product and service demand. MinePro service support includes new machine assembly, maintenance and repairs, systems upgrades, machine relocations, motors and transmissions rebuilds and repairs, structures weldments and repairs, and training for machine operators and maintenance personnel.

MinePro teams consist of mechanics, electricians, welders, machinists, assemblers and logistics warehouse managers, most of them native to the city or region in which they serve.

MinePro is a primary sales channel for surface mining equipment. However, it is capable of servicing underground mining equipment, and offers service support to the construction industry as well.

=== About ===
MinePro works with surface mining operations to ensure maximum productivity of equipment designed and built by P&H Mining Equipment including electric mining shovels, blast hole production drills, walking draglines, and supply parts and services for that equipment. It provides support for non-P&H equipment in some regions as well, including Hitachi trucks and excavators, Liebherr trucks, LeTourneau wheel loaders, CQMS dragline buckets and “GETs” or ground-engaging tools (e.g. crawler track shoes, bucket and dipper armor), Stamler feeder breakers and Continental Conveyor Products idler rolls and conveyor systems among others.

MinePro continues the after-market service support function that began with the founding of P&H Mining Equipment by industrial artisans Alonzo Pawling and Henry Harnischfeger in 1884. As designers and builders of industrial equipment, Pawling and Harnischfeger were well positioned to provide installation, preventive maintenance, repairs, rebuilds and upgrades for the industrial operations including construction and mining firms that invested in their products.

The rugged, reliable and productive quality of their products combined with the expertise available from Pawling and Harnischfeger were key factors in the ability of their manufacturing enterprise to endure economic recessions and continue growing into a modern, global business referred to by their customers simply as “P&H” by the start of the 1900s. P&H Mining Equipment formalized the name of its service support business in 1996 by renaming it “P&H MinePro Services”.

=== Takeover of Beloit Corporation ===
P&H took over The Beloit Corporation in 1986. Beloit Corporation was a large, worldwide paper machine manufacturing corporation based in Beloit, Wisconsin. The Beloit Corporation had started nearly 150 year prior as BIW "Beloit Iron Works" corporation and sat on the original grounds of Beloit Iron Works. By the year 2000, years of business operations in the Greater Pacific (including Indonesia, Thailand, etc.) under Harnischfeger lead the company to bankruptcy. Beloit Iron Works antiquity and signage remain as a homage to the city and the company.

=== Range of services ===
- Replacement parts and assemblies for P&H and some non-P&H mining machinery including shovels, drills and draglines
- Mining equipment mechanical and electrical system upgrades and modernizations
- Mining equipment installations, rebuilds and relocations
- Preventive maintenance, emergency repairs and mechanical and electrical systems audit services
- Used equipment trade, purchases, relocations, upgrades
