= Joseph Francis Joy =

- Born: September 13, 1883; Cumberland, Maryland
- Died: February 1957 (aged 73)
- Occupation: Inventor

Joseph Francis Joy (September 13, 1883 – February 1957) was born in the small mining town of Cumberland, Maryland. Joy is known for being an inventor. He accumulated 190 patents in his lifetime.

His major inventions were the first continuous mining machines recognized as milestones in the history of underground mining mechanization. He had pioneered new concepts in hydraulics, modern control and power circuits, trackless mining equipment, efficient gearing and seal designs as well as dozens of other "firsts" in the industry. His mining machines changed forever the way minerals are mined dramatically improving production. Many of his machines are still in use today.

Joy is also known for founding the company that bears his name in Franklin Pennsylvania: Joy Mining Machinery.

A patent office image of Joy's Loading machine
