= PMT Italia =

Italian paper machinery manufacturer

PMT Italia SpA
- Founded: 1897
- Founder: Francesco Poccardi
- Headquarters: Pinerolo, Italy
- Area served: Worldwide
- Website: pmtitalia.com

PMT Italia, whose name means Paper Machinery Technology, supports the paper industry by means of mechanical engineering, automation engineering, on site services and manufacturing of machines for all grades of paper. The company was created in 2000 from the purchase of Beloit Italia, the Italian subsidiary of Beloit Corporation. Its headquarters are in Pinerolo (TO), Italy. PMT Italia is one of the leading industrial company of the city with Corcos and Euroball.

== History ==
=== From a local foundry… (1897-1957) ===
In 1897, the Piedmontese entrepreneur Francesco Poccardi set up a local foundry in Pinerolo, next to the railway connecting Pinerolo and Turin. A few years later, the company expanded its activity by creating a new factory for producing and refurbishing railway vehicles under the name of Officine Meccaniche di Pinerolo.

In 1938, the local foundry and the new factory were consolidated into a new company: the Officine Meccaniche Poccardi Pinerolo. The new company started to supply the paper machinery field.

=== To Beloit Italia (1957-2000) ===
The American paper machines producer, Beloit Corporation bought up the company in September 1957. The company was renamed Beloit Italia and started to supply machines and equipment to the worldwide pulp and paper industry.

From 1957 to 2000, 85% of the production was exported to paper mills all over the world.

After 43 years of cooperation, Beloit Italia was bought up when Beloit Corporation collapsed into bankruptcy.

=== PMT Italia (2000-.....) ===
All the shares of Beloit Italia were sold to the Nugo Group and the company was renamed PMT Italia S.p.A. The company, still producing paper machinery, has extended its activities to engineering of auxiliary equipment for paper machines in its historic facilities. The company has around 250 employees in its Pinerolo site.

== Business areas ==
=== PMT Italia S.p.A. ===
PMT Italia is based in Pinerolo (TO), in 65.000 m2 facilities where the company designs paper machines and components for the worldwide paper industry. Since the Nugo Group has bought it up, PMT Italia has enlarged its activities through the creation of subsidiaries.

=== PMT Industries Ltd ===
PMT Industries Ltd is the first subsidiary created by PMT Italia. The company has been bought from the former Sandusky Walmsley in 2006. The production site is located in Bolton, United Kingdom.

This satellite manufactures Yankee dryers, MG cylinders and castings in its 17.000 m2 plant. The factory is equipped with one of the largest iron foundries in Europe.

No longer trading in Administration

=== PMT South Africa Pty. Ltd ===
In 2007, PMT South Africa was also bought from Sandusky. The office is situated in Johannesburg, South Africa.

The company provides after-sale services and has a commercial function too. The subsidiary is mainly focused on the South African market.

=== PMT Winding Oy ===
In 2010, PMT Italia has founded PMT Winding Oy in Tehtaankatu, Valkeakoski, Finland. The company is focused on the production of winders.

== See also ==
- List of Italian companies
