= Sno-Freighter =

1950s singular heavy land vehicle

Coordinates: 64.93154°N 147.63857°W

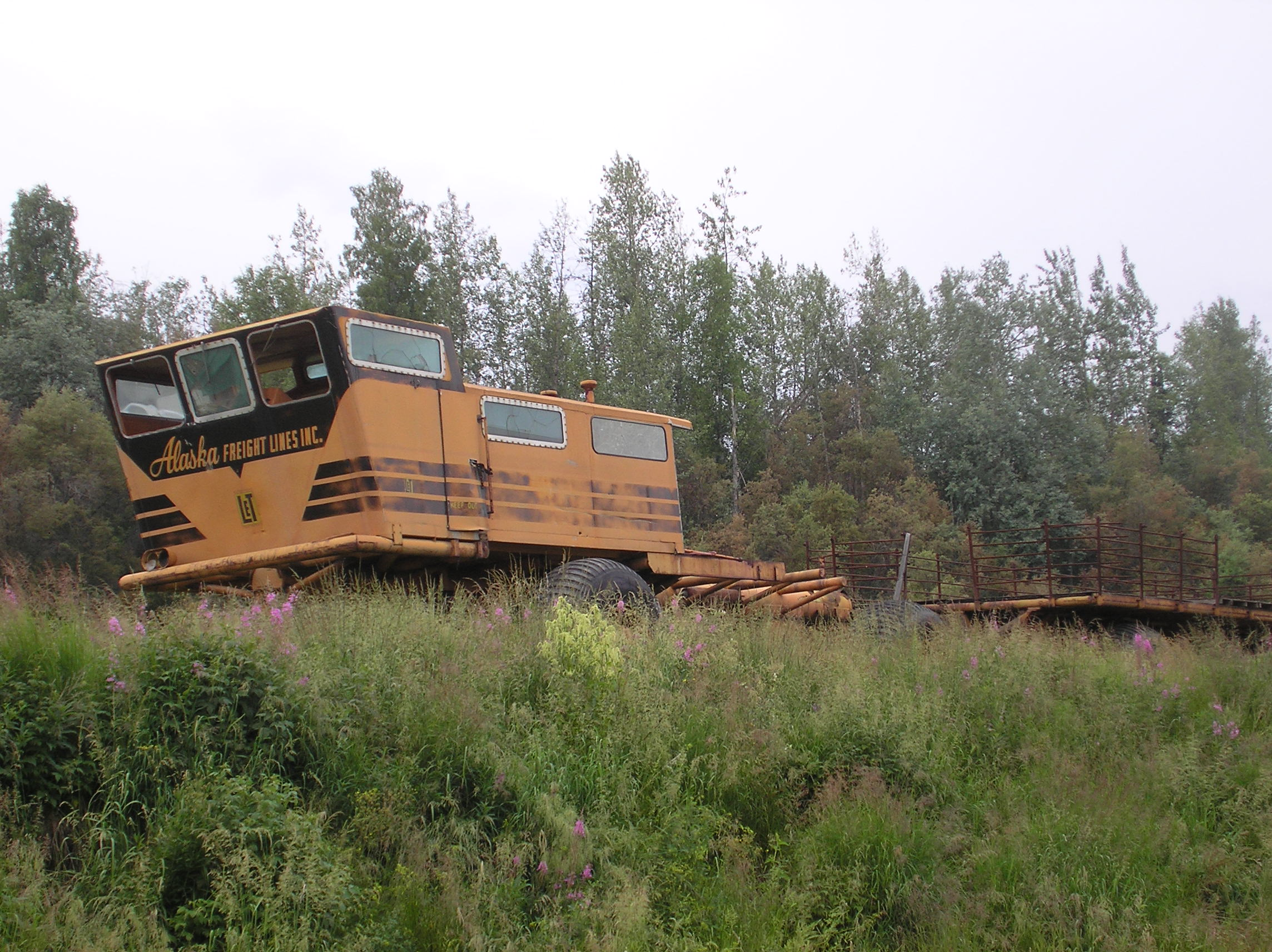
The Sno-Freighter, summer 2009.

The Sno-Freighter is a one-of-a-kind land vehicle designed by LeTourneau Technologies (now part of Cameron International) for Alaska Freight Lines in the 1950s. During that decade, Alaska Freight Lines won the contract to transport construction material to build the Distant Early Warning Line (DEW) in far northern Alaska and Canada. At the time, no roads crossed the Arctic Circle in North America, there were almost no runways for air transportation, and the polar ice cap prevented seaborne transport.

LeTourneau had built a series of prototype "land trains" for use in roadless environments, and Alaska Freight Lines contracted the company to build a special model for cold-climate transportation on January 5, 1954. The contract called for an off-road vehicle capable of transporting 150 short tons (140,000 kg) of cargo in −68 °F (−56 °C) temperatures, through 4-foot (1.2 m) deep streams, and deep snowdrifts.

Using parts from its previous land trains, LeTourneau manufactured the Model VC-22 Sno-Freighter, completing it on February 17. It left the factory in Longview, Texas on March 16. The "locomotive" (serial # 5198) of the Sno-Freighter contained two Cummins NHV-12BI V-12 diesel engines operating at 400 horsepower each. These engines drove 24 electric motors (one for each wheel on the locomotive and trailing cars). Each car (serials # 5199-5203) measured 40 feet (12 m) in length and was 16 feet (4.9 m) wide. They carried 30 tons each for a combined payload of 150 tons for the 274-foot (84 m) long Sno-Freighter.

Its first trip under power was in the Fall of 1954, when Alaska Freight Lines began their 400-mile trek north from Fairbanks, Alaska to the Arctic Ocean. During its second trip north in the Fall of 1955, the Sno-Freighter jack-knifed and its engines burned just north of Eagle, Alaska. The cargo was off-loaded onto either "Cat" trains (Caterpillar bulldozers pulling cargo sleds) or one of the eleven 1956 Mack LRVSW semi trucks that Alaska Freight Lines had purchased to supplement the Sno-Freighter.

Today, the Sno-Freighter is abandoned and lies next to the Steese Highway in Fox, Alaska. The surrounding vegetation has since largely obscured the machine from visibility.

== See also ==
- Overland train
