= Yukon Transportation Museum =

Museum in Whitehorse, Canada

Coordinates: 60.7119°N 135.0792°W

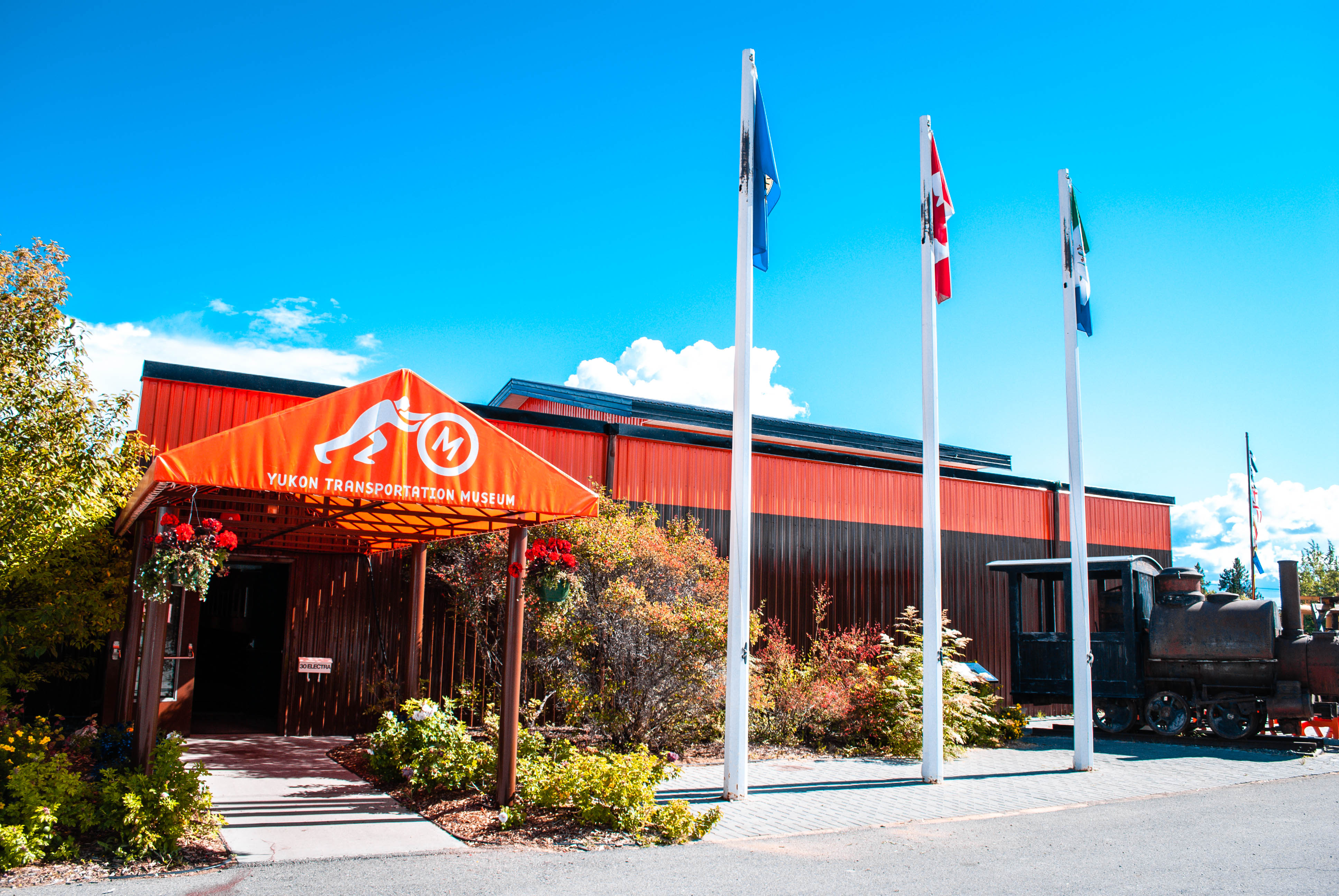
Yukon Transportation Museum, Whitehorse

The Yukon Transportation Museum (YTM) is a non-profit organization and registered charity located in Whitehorse, Yukon, Canada, on the traditional territories of the Ta'an Kwächan Council and the Kwanlin Dün First Nation. Founded in 1990, YTM specializes in exhibiting and examining the Yukon Territory's rugged character through stories of ingenious and self-sufficient transportation modes, entrepreneurs, pioneers and inventors. The museum's mandate is to 'identify, acquire, preserve and conserve the history, cultural material and artifacts of Yukon's transportation modes, and to interpret this history in an educational manner for all Yukoners and visitors alike.'

Although the Klondike Gold Rush and construction of the Alaska Highway are prominent themes in exhibits and displays, all facets of transportation in the Yukon are explored, including Yukon First Nations watercraft, bush pilots and northern flying, dog sledding and the Yukon Quest, and human-propelled transport like snowshoes and cross-country skis.

Some of the exhibits on display at the museum include the R.G. Letourneau company's LCC-1 Sno-Train, a Douglas DC-3 (call sign CF-CPY) known as one of the largest weathervanes in the world, a G scale model railroad of the Whitehorse waterfront circa 1920s, and several pieces of equipment from the White Pass and Yukon Route, including a straddle carrier, an ore car and a replica model of the company's 'Lake Annie' passenger car.
