= Overland train =

Type of oversized semi-trailer truck that could travel over most terrain

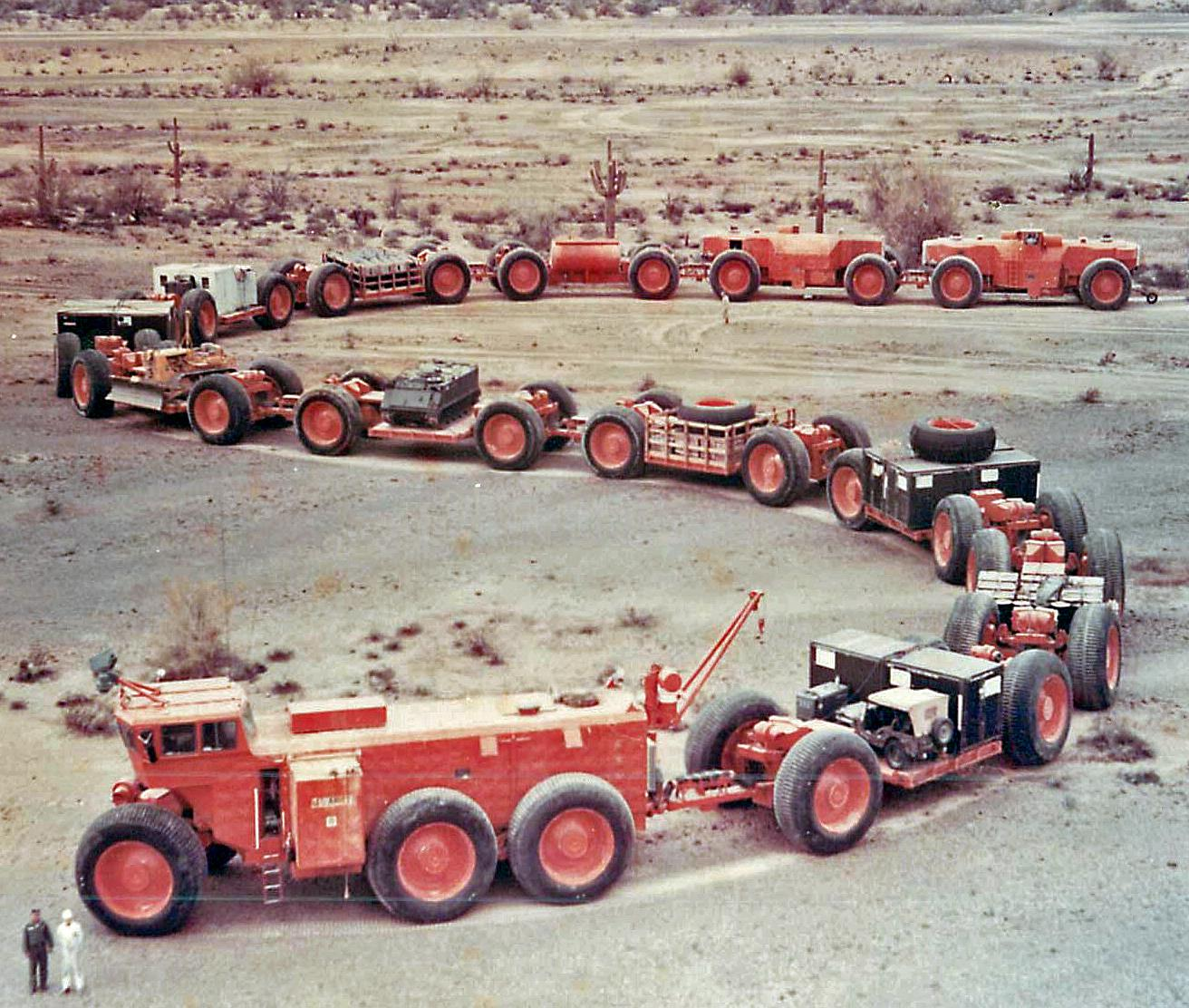
TC-497 Overland Train Mark II

In the 1950s, LeTourneau Inc. developed several overland trains, essentially oversized semi-trailer trucks that could travel over almost any terrain. Their intention was to be able to handle logistics needs without being dependent on local road or rail systems, allowing them to operate in back-country areas. The US Army had three experimental units built, the largest reaching almost 600 feet (183 m) long, which holds the record for the longest off-road vehicle. Road trains are in use in certain roles today, but the US Army examples and a few derivatives appear to be the only off-road examples built.

== History ==
=== LeTourneau ===
In the 1950s and 1960s LeTourneau Inc, a heavy-equipment maker based in Longview, Texas, developed the idea of using a diesel-electric transmission to drive multi-wheeled vehicles. Each wheel was driven by a separate electric motor, which gave the vehicles much better traction as the force of the engine was spread across a number of wheels. In general terms these vehicles were similar to the diesel-electric locomotives that were being widely introduced by the railways at the same time, but they replaced the steel wheels with rubber ones. The earliest vehicles using the system were a number of 6x6 graders, wheel tractor-scrapers (touranapulls) and other earthmovers.

In 1953, R. G. LeTourneau sold the earthmoving portions of the business to Westinghouse, a sale that included a five-year moratorium before LeTourneau could sell into the market again. While the moratorium ran out, LeTourneau developed a number of new vehicles based on the same drivetrain. These included a number of special-purpose military designs like launchers for the Corporal missile, heavy-duty tugs that could quickly haul crashed bombers off runways, and even an enormous vehicle intended to pick up beached landing craft.

=== VC-12 Tournatrain ===
LeTourneau VC-12 Tournatrain

The overland train concept first developed as a way to haul trees out of the bush, without the need to prepare a road capable of supporting a traditional truck. A truck would need to have a surface flat and strong enough for its driven wheels, normally four at the rear of the cab, to gain traction needed to climb any grades. With multiple driven wheels, LeTourneau's 6x6 diesel-electrics were an obvious solution, but a single vehicle was too small to justify their purchase costs. The solution was to turn the 6x6 into an extendable design, using flexible connections to allow any number of driven wheels to be added, as needed.

The first of these designs was the VC-12 Tournatrain, which consisted of a power truck with a 500-hp Cummins VT-12 engine, and three 20-ton trailers. Each wheel was powered by a separate electric motor, four to each vehicle, including the locomotive. First tested in February 1953, after several months of testing, an additional four trailers were added, with the last holding a second engine. The new version was completed in February 1954, and supported a maximum payload of 140 tons.

=== VC-22 Sno-Freighter, the DEW line ===
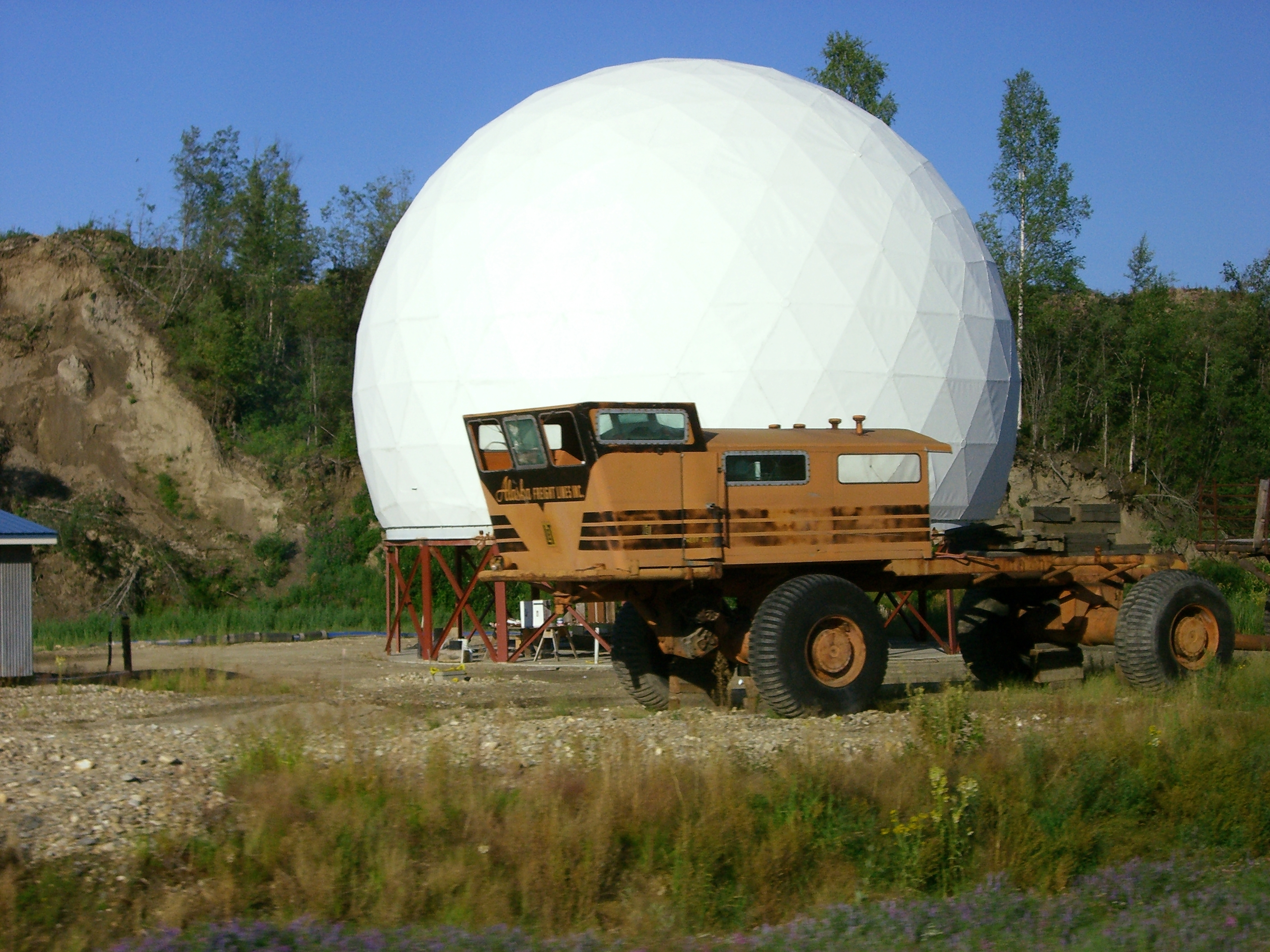
LeTourneau Snow Train

During this period the U.S. and Canada were in the process of developing the DEW Line, which was located in areas with no roads, few airbases, and in areas where the sea ice often prevented ships from accessing the sites. On 15 April 1954 the company demonstrated VC-12 to the US Army Transportation Research and Development Command, or TRADCOM, proposing that the system would be useful for logistics operations in the arctic if equipped with more wheels.

TRADCOM offered funding to create the TC-264 Sno-Buggy, which had eight huge 120-inch (3.0 m) rubber tires, arranged in pairs and driven by four motors powered by a single Allison V-1710 engine running on butane. The resulting vehicle has an enormous amount of tire area to vehicle weight, allowing it to float on the tundra and snow. First unveiled in June 1954, the Sno-Buggy was sent to Greenland for testing.

Alaska Freight Lines of Seattle had contracted with Western Electric to provide 500 tons of equipment to the DEW (distant early warning) stations being built in the Alaska sector. Hearing of the VC-12, on 5 January 1955 they signed a contract with LeTourneau for the construction of the VC-22 Sno-Freighter. The contract called for a single locomotive and six cars able to haul 150 tons of material, cross rivers up to 4 feet (1.2 m) deep, cut through snow drifts and operate at temperatures as low as −68 °F (−56 °C). The locomotive provided AC power from the two 400-hp Cummins NVH-12 engines, powering its own four wheels and the five four-wheel drive trailers, forming a 274-foot-long (84 m) train.

Since the VC-22 was based almost entirely on existing parts from their 6x6 vehicles, even the tires, the company was able to deliver it with surprising speed. It was completed on 17 February 1955, painted, and then sent to Alaska on the 21st. The vehicle served well throughout 1955, but in the second season of use a fire consumed the locomotive's power generation section and the remains were pulled out of Canada. When Alaska Freight Lines's contract with Western Electric ran out it was soon left to rot. Today it sits abandoned outside Fairbanks, Alaska near the Steese Highway.

On their own initiative, LeTourneau took the basic VC-22, changed the engine to the 600-hp VT-12, and changed the trailers to side-dumping bins to produce a Side-Dump Train. The six-wheeled locomotive also had its own bin, and could operate independently. Completed in October 1955, the company was still under the moratorium period and could not sell it for earthmoving, and the train saw no orders.

=== LCC-1 Sno-Train ===
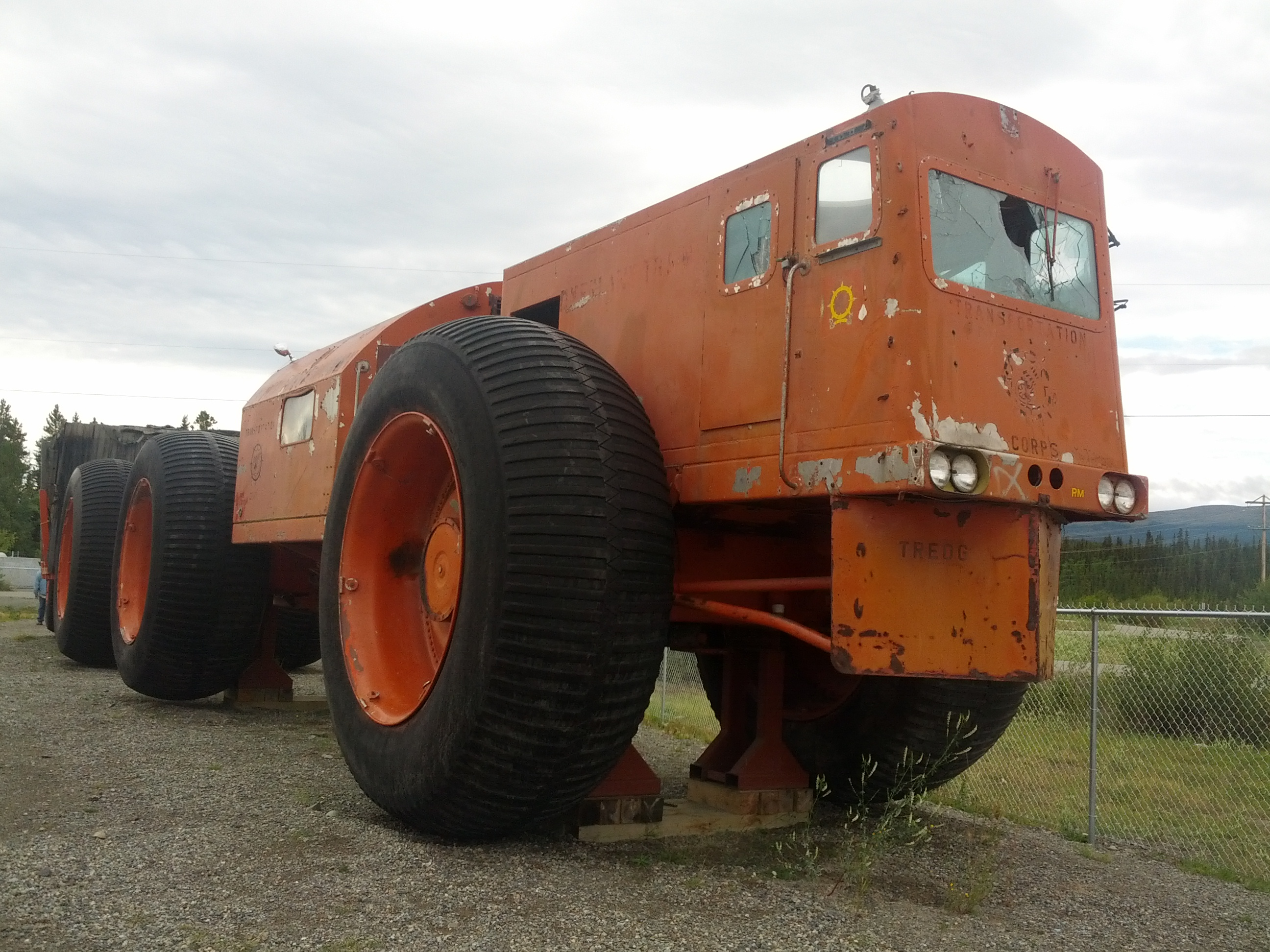
A LeTourneau LCC-1 Sno-Train on display at the Yukon Transportation Museum in Whitehorse 60°42′39.7″N 135°04′48″W

Impressed with the results of the Sno-Buggy, in late 1954 the Army Transportation Corps asked LeTourneau to combine the features of the Tournatrain and Sno-Buggy into a new vehicle. LeTourneau called the result the YS-1 Army Sno-Train but the Army knew it as the Logistics Cargo Carrier, or LCC-1. The LCC-1 combined the wheels of the Sno-Buggy with the power system of the Tournatrain to produce a 16x16 vehicle with one locomotive and three cars capable of handling a load of 45 tons in total. The control cab was itself articulated into two compartments; a heated driving compartment in front for the crew of three, and a rear section containing the 600-hp diesel engine, generators and fuel tanks. The cab also sported a powered crane on the rear.

In spite of starting the project before the VC-22, the LCC-1 required much more customization, and was not completed until January 1956. After testing at the factory, it was handed over to the Army in March, and continued testing in snow at the TRADCOM proving grounds in Houghton, Michigan. After acceptance, it was sent to Greenland, and then traveled around the north for some time, making its last cargo run in 1962. The LCC-1 eventually ended up abandoned in a salvage yard right behind Fort Wainwright, Fairbanks, Alaska. Despite the years of neglect, the LCC-1 still has its 10 foot tall wheels as well as its generators. In addition to the LCC-1's primary drive unit, there are also ten of its original trailers in the Fort Wainwright yard, which is not far from the site where the VC-22 sits abandoned. Today, the LCC-1 now has a permanent site at the Yukon Transportation Museum in Whitehorse, Yukon. One trailer also resides at the front of the Mukluk Land theme park near Tok, Alaska.

=== TC-497 Overland Train, Mk II ===
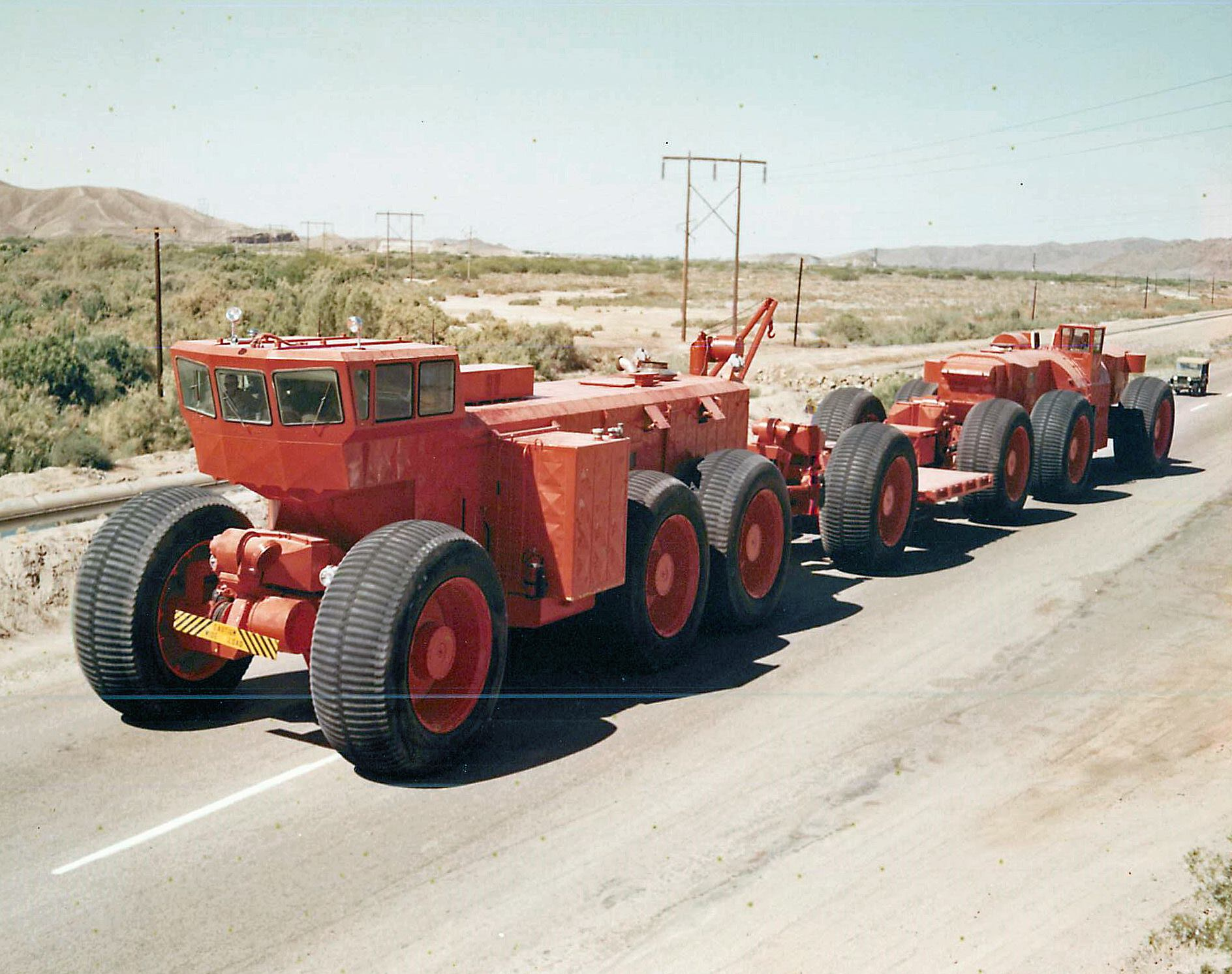
Short configuration of the TC-497

LCC-1 was so successful that in 1958 the Army contracted for a larger version, the TC-497 Overland Train Mark II. Generally similar to the LCC-1 in concept, the Mark II included a number of features to allow the train to grow to any length.

One change was the removal of the Cummins engines and their replacement with gas turbine engines of higher power and lower weight. Whereas the LCC-1 had a single 600-hp engine, the Overland Train had four 1,170-hp Saturn 10MC engines from Solar Turbines, one in the "control car" and three others spread through the train. New power trailers could be added at any point along the train. To further reduce weight, most of the vehicle was built from welded aluminum.

Taking corners was a serious problem. If the train made a sharp turn, each trailer after the first would cut inside the previous trailers path, and each trailer would make a larger diameter turn than the previous, and with the length, it was difficult for the driver to estimate how much space would be needed - if it was available. B-trains have a similar but slightly reduced problem and as a result may be restricted from some roads. To avoid an obstacle, an excessively wide turn would be needed. To solve this problem, the trailers had steerable wheels that would each turn when they reached the same point on the ground, eliminating the cut in and allowing the train to make much sharper turns.

The Mark II had a much larger six-wheeled cab that was over 20 feet (6.1 m) tall and was no longer articulated due to the ability for all the wheels to be steered. The turbine engine was much smaller than the diesel it replaced, allowing the interior to support a crew of six with sleeping quarters, toilets and a galley. It was even equipped with a radar. An additional two power cars and ten cargo cars were built for testing. In total the train now stretched over 570 feet (170 m). On flat ground it could carry 150 tons of cargo at about 20 mph. Range at full load was normally 350 to 400 miles (560 to 640 km), but additional fuel trailers could be added to extend it.

Final specifications were completed in 1960, and construction took most of 1961. After preliminary testing, it was handed to the Army in February 1962, and shipped to the Yuma Proving Ground in Yuma, Arizona. In testing under the "Project OTTER", for "Overland Train Terrain Evaluation Research", the vehicle performed well. But in the end the Army gave up on the idea as newer heavy-lift helicopters like the S-64 Skycrane made the train concept outdated.

The vehicle remained unused for a time, and was then put up for sale for $1.4 million in 1969. All that remains of the Mark II is the control cab which remains at Yuma Proving Ground Heritage Center, the rest was sold off to a local scrap dealer. The Mark II retains the record for the longest offroad vehicle in the world.

== See also ==
- Antarctic Snow Cruiser
- Road train
- Trackless train

== Sources ==
- Orlemann, Eric (2001). LeTourneau Earthmovers. MBI Publishing. p. 66. ISBN 0-7603-0840-3.
