= Henry Harnischfeger =

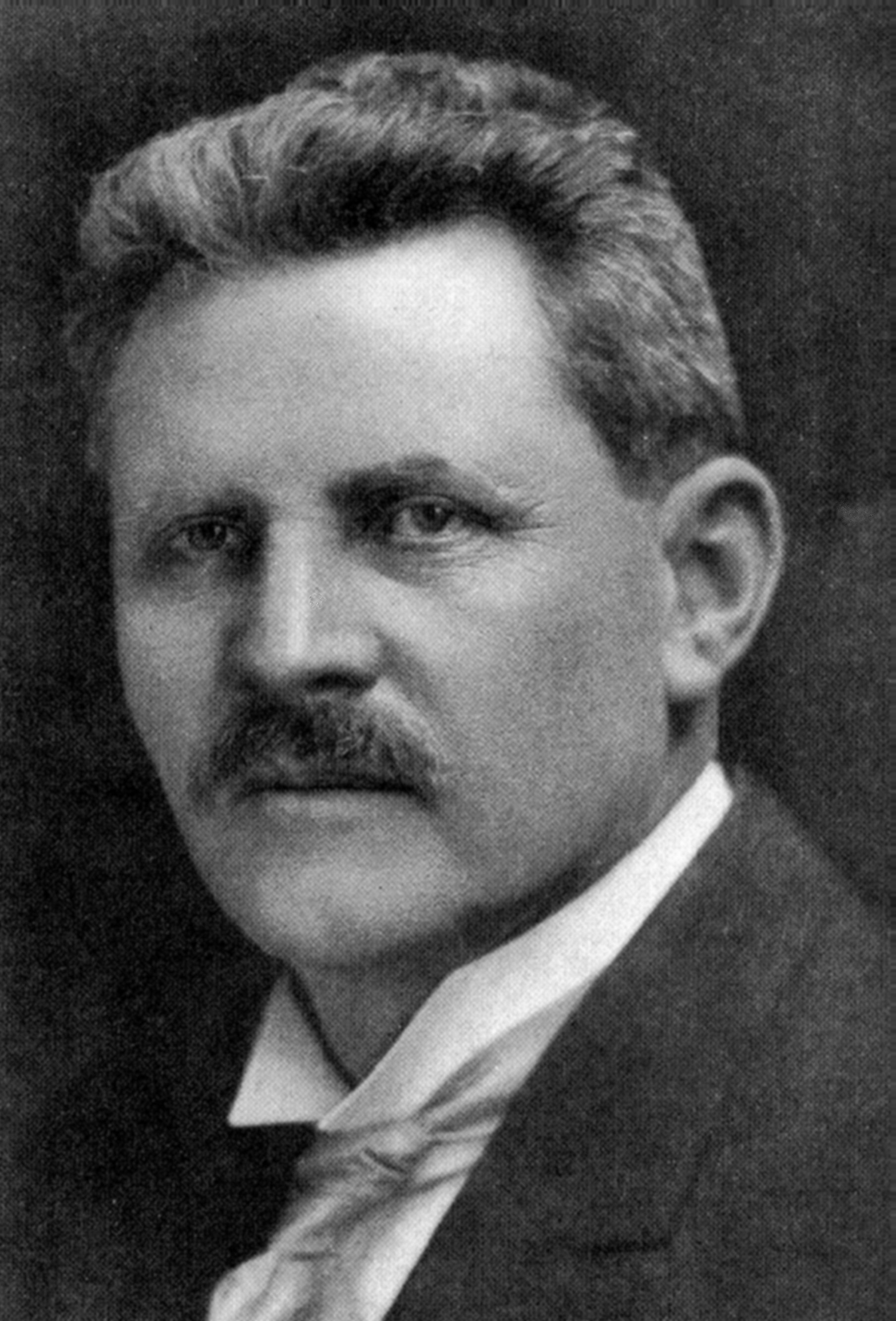
Henry Harnischfeger

Henry Harnischfeger (July 10, 1855 – November 15, 1930) was a pioneer in the Milwaukee, Wisconsin, mining industry.

== Early life and career ==
Harnischfeger was born in Salmünster, Kreis Schlüchtern, Hessen-Nassau, on July 10, 1855. He left his homeland in 1872 and came to the United States. He arrived in the U.S. on April 9, and was employed by the Singer Sewing Machine Company, which is now known as the Singer Corporation. He worked there for 9 years, and then came to Milwaukee, Wisconsin. He then worked for the White Hill Sewing Machine Company, where he managed casting patternmaking and gear machining operations at the Whitehill factory with Alonzo Pawling. They formed a machine and pattern shop on December 1, 1884. to manufacture, assemble and service components and equipment needed by other, larger manufacturing firms in the region.

== Pawling and Harnischfeger ==
In 1883 Pawling opened up Milwaukee Tool and Pattern Shop with Mauritz Weiss. The partnership dissolved after one year, and Harnischfeger took over Weiss' interests. Their customers included industrial knitting machine manufacturers, brick makers, grain drying equipment manufacturers and beer brewers.

They Manufactured valves for Bruno V. Nordberg. Bruno left Allis and rented the loft space above Pawling and Harnischfeger.

Christopher W. LeValley also came to the shop for custom work. He went on to found the Chain Belt Company

Frederick Pabst, who at that time owned Best Brewing Company with Emil Schandein, gave them brewery equipment orders. In 1887, Pawling and Harnischfeger helped rebuild and upgrade an overhead bridge crane within the foundry operations of the Edward P. Allis Manufacturing Company, owned by Edward P. Allis, that collapsed following an attempt to move a load beyond its rated lifting capacity. The rebuilt crane featured a simplified system of motors and gearboxes to drive the bridge, as well as trolley and hoist functions on the lifting machine, replacing a complex system of ropes and pulleys that failed in the earlier version. Soon after, Pawling and Harnischfeger began building their line of overhead cranes for manufacturing and warehouse operations.

The Panic of 1893 caused demand to fall for the cranes designed and built by Pawling and Harnischfeger who by that time were being referred to as “P&H”. The partners expanded their product line to include earthmoving machines in order to increase the ability of their business to withstand the next economic downturn. In 1893 P&H acquired the motors and controls manufacturing assets of the Gibb Electric Company following the acquisition of Gibb by Westinghouse Electric Manufacturing Company, as Pawling and Harnischfeger wanted control over the application of motors applied to their crane line.

== Harnischfeger Corporation ==
The Pawling & Harnischfeger business had become known as Harnischfeger Corporation following the death of Alonzo Pawling in 1911. By the mid-1920s, the firm had become a large and growing supplier of crawler-mounted shovels and cranes applied to construction and mining operations – all bearing the familiar “P&H” trademark that had become synonymous with exceptional quality and service value established by Pawling & Harnischfeger. Over the ensuing decades, P&H-trademark shovels and cranes would grow in size, capacity, and drive and control technology. The firm expanded its product line with the onset of the Great Depression, adding welding machinery, diesel engines and prefabricated homes to its P&H line of shovels and cranes.

== Death ==
Henry died unexpectedly from heart failure on November 15, 1930, at 75 years old. The active management of the Harnischfeger Company then went to his son, Walter Harnischfeger, a Nazi sympathizer and patron of Joseph McCarthy.

The Harnischfeger Mansion, built in 1905, still stands at North 35th St. and West Wisconsin Avenue in Milwaukee.
