= Christopher W. LeValley =

Christopher W. LeValley (April 19, 1833 – January 4 1916), (also known as Christopher Warren LeValley and C.W. LeValley) was the co-founder, president, general manager and chairman of the board of directors of Chain Belt Company of Milwaukee, Wisconsin. He invented the chain belt mixer.

During his career, LeValley was granted over 100 patents for agricultural implements, detachable chain belts, and other mechanical devices.

LeValley was inducted into the Wisconsin Industrial Hall of Fame on August 9, 1966.
