= Joy Global =

Mining company

Joy Global Inc.
- Industry: Mining
- Founded: 1958; 68 years ago
- Founder: Joseph Francis Joy
- Defunct: April 5, 2017; 9 years ago
- Fate: Acquired by Komatsu Limited
- Headquarters: Milwaukee, Wisconsin
- Key people: Edward L. Doheny II, CEO; James M. Sullivan, CFO
- Products: Surface mining machinery Underground mining machinery
- Revenue: ▼$2.371 billion (2016)
- Net income: ▲$0.058 billion (2016)
- Total assets: ▼$3.426 billion (2016)
- Total equity: ▼$1.381 billion (2016)
- Number of employees: 10,000 (2016)
- Subsidiaries: P&H Mining Equipment

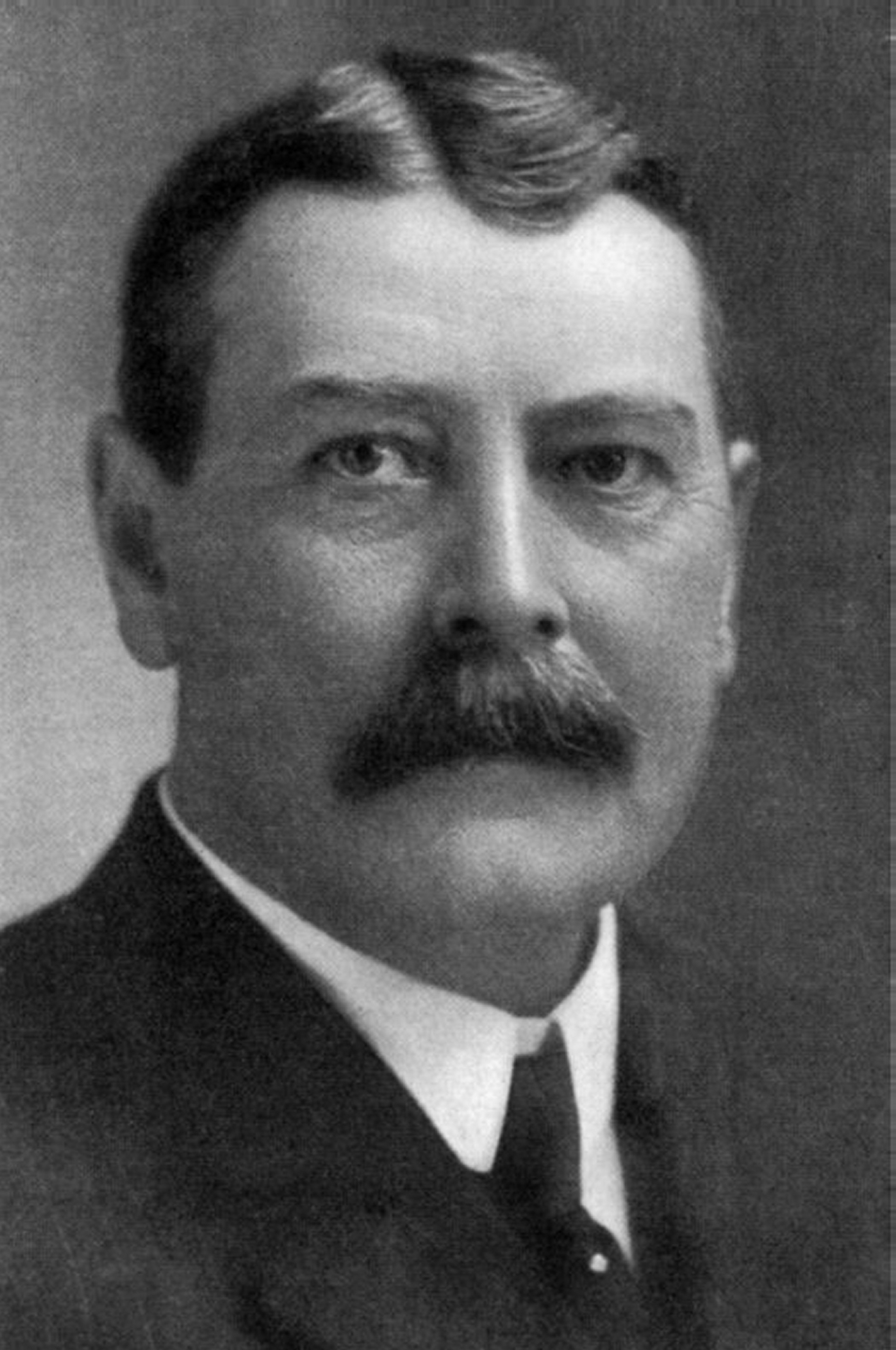
Alonzo Pawling

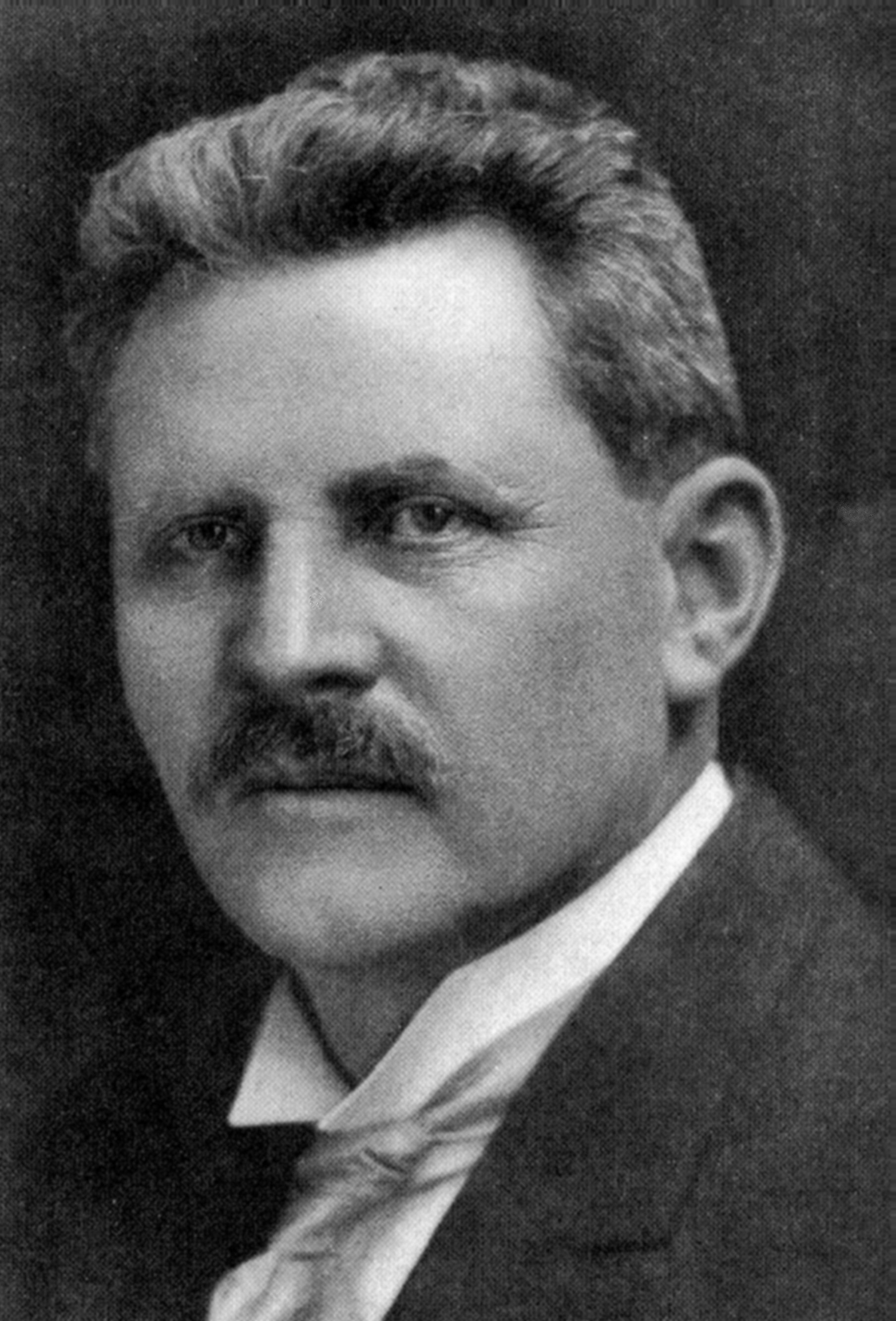
Henry Harnischfeger

Joseph Francis Joy.

Joy Global Inc. was a company that manufactured and serviced heavy equipment used in the extraction and haulage of coal and minerals in both underground and surface mining. The company had manufacturing facilities in Alabama, Pennsylvania, Texas, Wisconsin, Australia, Canada, China, France, South Africa, Poland and the United Kingdom. In 2017, Joy Global was acquired by Komatsu Limited and was renamed Komatsu Mining Corp.

In 2016, sales of services accounted for 78% of revenues, while sales of equipment accounted for 22% of revenues.

== History ==
The company had its beginnings in Milwaukee, Wisconsin. At the time, Milwaukee was a center of industrial machinery manufacturing at the convergence of three rivers entering Lake Michigan. Among the growing number of machinery manufacturing firms in Milwaukee in the 1870s was a struggling firm known as the Whitehill Sewing Machine Company. Alonzo Pawling and Henry Harnischfeger managed castings patternmaking and gear machining operations within the Whitehill factory. Concerned that Whitehill lacked the marketing and manufacturing discipline needed to grow, they formed a machine and pattern shop on December 1, 1884. to manufacture, assemble and service components and equipment needed by other, larger manufacturing firms in the region.

In 1887, Pawling and Harnischfeger helped rebuild and upgrade an overhead bridge crane within the foundry operations of the Edward P. Allis Manufacturing Company that had collapsed following an attempt to move a load beyond its rated lifting capacity. The rebuilt crane replaced the complex system of ropes and pulleys that failed with a simplified system of motors and gearboxes. Soon after, Pawling and Harnischfeger began building their own line of overhead cranes for manufacturing and warehouse operations.

The Panic of 1893 caused demand to fall for the cranes designed and built by Pawling and Harnischfeger, who were referred to by customers as “P&H”. The partners decided to expand their product line to include earthmoving machines in order to increase their ability to withstand the next economic downturn. That same year, P&H acquired the motors and controls manufacturing assets of the Gibbs Electric Company following the acquisition of Gibbs by Westinghouse Electric Manufacturing Company, as Pawling and Harnischfeger wanted greater control over the application of motors applied to their crane line.

In 1895, in Cumberland, Maryland, 12-year-old Joseph Francis Joy went to work as a slate picker in a coal mine, eventually working underground with picks, hand-held drilling augers and shovels to load coal into rail-mounted cars. By 1903, the 20-year-old was learning mechanical engineering via a mail-order course and tinkering with ideas for mechanizing the coal-mining process. Joy's designs attracted no interest from underground coal mines at first, but the Pittsburgh Coal Company in 1916 saw the potential productivity gains that might be obtained by investing in a Joy gathering-arm type loader. Joy obtained a U.S. patent on his device in 1919 and launched Joy Mining Machinery.

In Milwaukee, Pawling & Harnischfeger became known as the Harnischfeger Corporation following the death of Alonzo Pawling in 1911. Harnischfeger launched earth moving machinery line, starting with trenchers and eventually including power shovels and draglines.

By the mid-1920s, the firm had become a large and growing supplier of crawler-mounted shovels and cranes used in construction and mining operations. Over the ensuing decades, P&H-trademarked shovels and cranes grew in size, capacity and drives and controls technology. The firm expanded its product line with the onset of the Great Depression, adding welding machinery, diesel engines and prefabricated homes to its P&H line of shovels and cranes.

In 1956, Harnischfeger Corporation was listed on the American Stock Exchange.

By the 1960s and 1970s, the firm had divested its welding, diesel engines, and prefabricated homes businesses in order to concentrate on construction and mining machines, overhead cranes, hoists, and material handling systems. Recessions in the 1970s and 1980s led the firm to shift its strategic focus to include pulp and papermaking machinery and systems and computer systems applied to military and aerospace systems.

By 1983, the company had evolved into a conglomerate corporation known as Harnischfeger Industries, Inc. In 1986, Harnischfeger acquired the Beloit Corporation, a pulp and papermaking machinery firm, and Syscon Corporation, a Washington DC–based computer systems supplier.

In 1994, Harnischfeger Industries, Inc. bought Joy Mining Machinery for $1 billion in stock. Joy was a supplier of underground mining equipment based in Franklin, Pennsylvania.

In 1997, Harnischfeger sold the P&H overhead cranes and hoists business to Morris Material Handling.

The 1997 Asian financial crisis led to the collapse of a major paper manufacturing business based in Indonesia and the subsequent default on numerous contracts valued in excess of US$5.25 billion. One of those contracts valued in excess of US$250 million was held by Harnischfeger Industries’ Beloit Corporation subsidiary.

In June 1999, Harnischfeger Industries filed for Chapter 11 bankruptcy.

On July 12, 2001, Joy Global Inc. became the direct successor to Harnischfeger Industries, Inc. upon emergence from the Chapter 11 financial restructuring process.

In 2008, the company acquired N.E.S. Investment Co. and its wholly owned subsidiary, Continental Crushing & Conveying (CCC), a supplier of material crushing and conveying systems for surface mining operations.

In 2011, the company acquired LeTourneau Technologies, the mining equipment and drilling systems business unit of Rowan Companies. The acquisition expanded the scope of the company by adding high-capacity front-end loaders for mining operations. Later that year, Joy Global divested the LeTourneau drilling products business to Cameron International.

In July 2011, the company acquired a 41% stake in International Mining Machinery Holdings, one of China's biggest manufacturers of long-wall mining shearers for extracting coal from underground mines, for US$585 million, with plans to obtain the remaining shares of the China-based mining equipment manufacturer through a tender offer. In November 2011, Joy Global acquired an additional 10.5% of the outstanding shares of International Mining.

In 2013, Edward (Ted) L. Doheny, II was named chief executive officer of the company.

In 2016, the company sold a steel plate mill to Nucor for $29 million.

In 2017, Komatsu Limited acquired the company.

== Operations ==
The company marketed equipment to underground mine operations using the “Joy” products trademark. Surface mining equipment is marketed using the “P&H” products trademark.

Joy Global's underground business received 90% of its revenue from coal projects, and from the manufacture of underground mining equipment.

In 2011 underground mining machinery accounted for 60.5% of Joy Global's revenue (excluding LeTourneau) up from 60.3% in 2010.

=== Underground mining machinery ===
Joy Mining Machinery (Joy) was the world's largest producer of high productivity underground mining machinery for the extraction of coal and other bedded materials including trona and salt. Its products included:

- Continuous miners – electric, self-propelled digging machines that cut material using carbide-tipped bits on a horizontal rotating drum.
- Longwall shearers – a material-cutting machine that moves back and forth on an armored face conveyor running parallel to the coal or other material being mined. Using carbide-tipped bits on cutting drums at each end, the shearer cuts a 1.2-meter to 6.5-meter swath of material on each pass of longwall mining and simultaneously loads the material onto a conveyor belt.
- Powered roof supports – to provide an open work space shielded against mine roof collapse, roof supports use powerful hydraulic cylinders to elevate and hold strong, thick steel plates in a horizontal position to protect the longwall shearer and armored face conveyor. The supports advance with the longwall shearer and armored face conveyor units, resulting in controlled roof falls behind the supports. A longwall face may range up to 400 meters in length.
- Armored face conveyors – material handling conveyors that transport material cut by the shearer away from the longwall face.
- Shuttle cars – low-profile, electric-powered, rubber-tire material haulage vehicles that transport up to 22 metric tons of coal and other material from continuous miners to the main mine run-out conveyor belt, discharging their material loads with the help of on-board chain conveyors.
- Flexible conveyor trains – electric-powered, self-propelled conveyor systems available in lengths up to 570 feet (170 meters) and capable of being configured into multiple 90-degree turns to help move material out of an underground mine operation.
- Roof bolters – drilling rigs that bore holes into an underground mine roof, making possible the insertion of long metal bolts to help reinforce the mine roof.
- Battery haulers – battery-powered material haulage cars similar to shuttle cars.
- Continuous haulage systems – unlike the pulsed, batch load throughput made possible by usage of shuttle cars and battery haulers, continuous haulage systems feature a connected series of bridge structures that utilize chain conveyors to obtain continuous throughput of material from the mine face to the main mine load-out conveyor belts.

Joy Mining Machinery operated a global network of service centers and warehouses to help underground mining operations obtain high levels of equipment and mining systems reliability and productivity. Joy applies a “life cycle management” strategy to help optimize the utility and potential life of the equipment it designs, builds and supports for underground mining operations, all of which pursue a high-efficiency, high-throughput strategy to obtain lowest-possible cost-per-ton production of coal, salt, trona and other materials. Life cycle management support includes 24/7 emergency repairs as well as preventive maintenance, performance-enhancing upgrades, rebuilds and relocations, and also remote health monitoring systems aimed at minimizing machine downtime through rapid diagnosis and correction of equipment faults and breakdowns.

=== Surface mining equipment ===
P&H Mining Equipment is a supplier of equipment and service support to the global surface mining industry. P&H shovels, drills and draglines are applied to copper, coal, iron ore, oil sands, gold, phosphates, molybdenum and diamond mining operations.

P&H Mining products include:

- Electric mining shovels – with working weights in excess of 1,645 tons / 1,492 metric tons and powered by electric motors linked to planetary and case-type transmissions, P&H electric can move up to 120 tons / 109 metric tons of material every 30 seconds from the mine face into the waiting tray of a nearby haul truck or in-pit crushing-conveying system hopper. P&H shovel dippers range in size from 12 cubic yards / 9 cubic meters up to 82 cubic yards / 63 cubic meters.
- Blast hole drilling rigs – hard rock formations are typically found within surface mining operations and they must undergo drilling and blasting in order to fragment the rock for easier digging, crushing and refining processes within the mine operation. P&H blast hole drilling rigs apply either electricity or diesel power to obtain three forces needed to advance a tri-cone drill bit into hard rock: “pulldown” or downward bit-loading force, high-torque rotary force, and large volumes of “bailing air” needed to cool the tri-cone bit and evacuate or push rock chips, particles and dust toward the top of the tubular blast hole. When a grid of blast holes has been drilled, each hole is loaded with explosives and then carefully detonated in order to shatter and fragment the rock formation with a high-energy shock wave. Drills typically work ahead of advancing shovel-truck fleets in surface mine operations.
- Walking draglines – with working weights in excess of 6,000 tons / 5,440 metric tons and powered by large electric motors, a dragline excavator rests on large, flat, cylindrical steel “tubs” and equipped with football field-length booms and buckets large enough to hold several sport utility vehicles, walking draglines use hoist, swing and drag forces to cast their buckets out to the next targeted area from which earth needs to be gathered up and moved. They then apply inward “drag” force to quickly load the bucket, and then hoist and swing forces to cast-dump the material onto a nearby spoil pile. Draglines are used primarily to strip large volumes of overburden away from thick seams of coal. They are also a prime mover in phosphate mining operations.
- In-pit crushing-conveying systems – P&H is developing in-pit crushing-conveying systems that enable shovels to load a mobile mining crusher with material. That material is then relayed via a series of conveyors to spoil piles elsewhere in coal mine operations before the mine taps those spoil piles later on to reclaim mined lands.

P&H Mining Equipment provides a network of P&H MinePro services mine operations service support workshops, warehouses and teams of mechanics, electricians and welders. MinePro provides life cycle management support for P&H and other brands of mining equipment.
