= Beloit Corporation =

American iron and machine company, 1858–2000

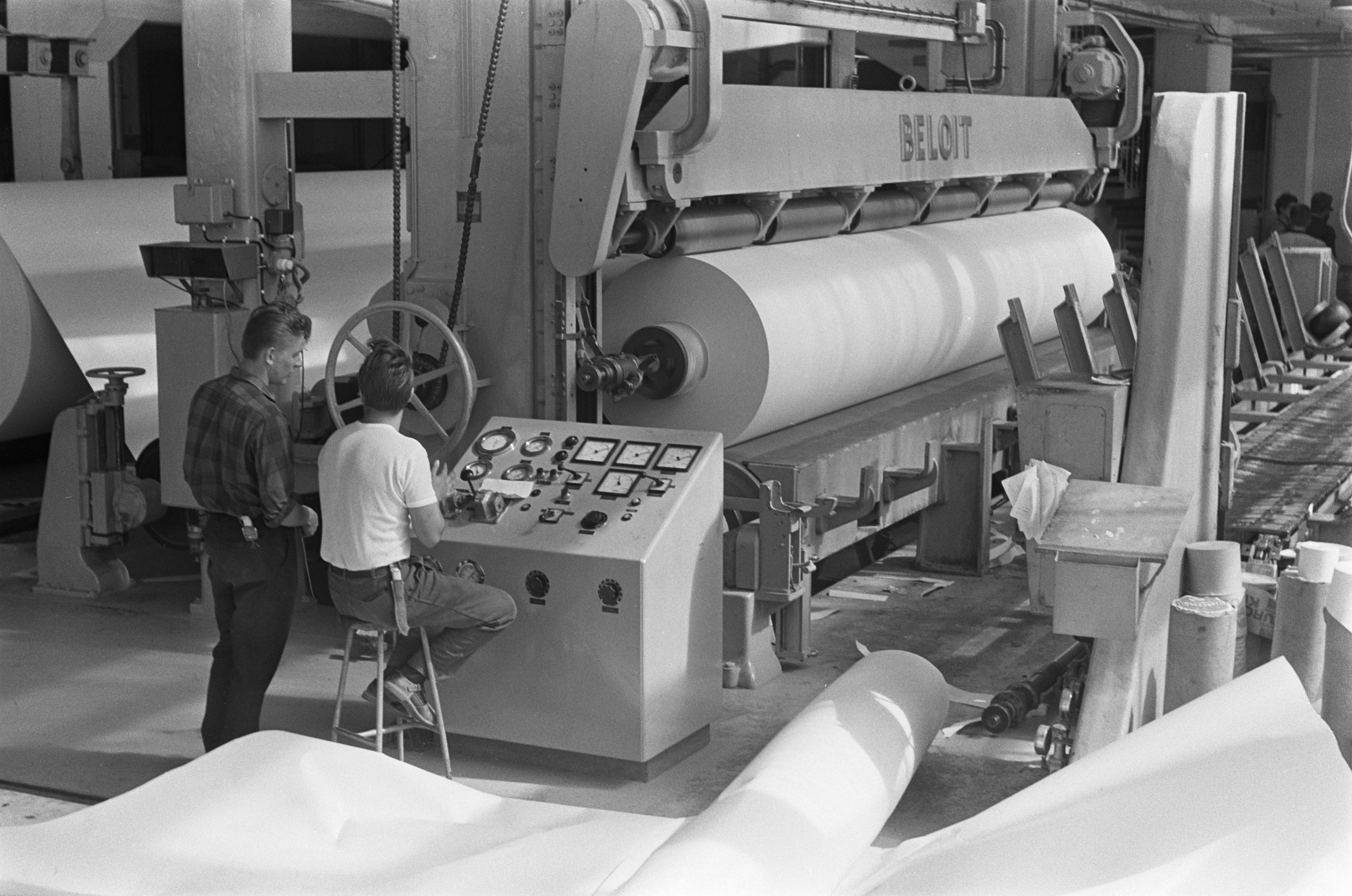
Beloit paper machine in Imatra mill

Beloit Corporation began in 1858 as a foundry in the Wisconsin city of Beloit and ended in 2000 when it filed for bankruptcy and parts of it were acquired by Metso Paper, a part of Metso Corporation. The Italian affiliate became PMT Italia under the control of the Nugo Group. For much of its history, the trading name was Beloit Iron Works, but it became simply "Beloit Corporation" in 1962.

== History ==
In its early phases, the business offered a variety of iron-based machinery products. It traded under the names of its founders, as Merrill and Houston Iron Works. It was bought by four of its employees in 1885 and become Beloit Iron Works.

In 1897 and 1900 the company exported its first paper machines to Japan and China respectively.

- 1858 Orson E. Merrill opens his shop in Beloit, Wisconsin.
- 1859 Orson Merrill and George Houston form the Merrill & Houston Iron Works.
- 1860 Merrill & Houston make their first paper machine parts.
- 1862 Merrill & Houston make their first complete paper machine.
- 1882 Ownership changed several times during the last 20 years. In 1882, even while building 14 paper machines, Merrill & Houston went into receivership.
- 1883 Merrill & Houston builds 8 paper machines.
- 1884 Merrill & Houston builds 5 paper machines.
- 1885 J. D. Rexford of Janesville, Wisconsin, offers a successful bid of $20,000 for the assets of Merrill & Houston Iron works.

Four ex-employees of Merrill and Houston combine to form a new company. They name the new company Beloit Iron Works. The new company has 10 employees and 4 working officers.

- 1886 Beloit Iron Works work force increases to 48 persons.
- 1889 Beloit Iron Works work force increases to-100 persons. Fred Messer, the president dies. Alonzo Aldrich succeeds him as president.
- 1891 Beloit Iron Works makes the first Yankee machine ever built in the United States.
- 1893 Beloit iron Works builds 106" wide paper machine that operates 275 FPM at the 1893 Columbian Exposition.
- 1896 Beloit Iron Works builds a new foundry, machine shops and offices on the-west side of Rock River near the original site of the Merrill plant.
- 1897 Shipped first off shore paper machine to Japan.
- 1900 Shipped two paper machines to China.
- 1900 Beloit builds cylinder machine to operate at 75 FPM and fourdrinier machines operating 400 to 500 FPM.
- 1910 Beloit builds a cylinder machine to operate 300 FPM and fourdrinier machines to operate at 600 FPM.
- 1916 Elbert H. Neese joins the company.
- 1919 Beloit builds the first fourdrinier machine to run faster than 1000 FPM (305 M/M).
- 1927 Beloit builds first YANKEE tissue machine to run over 1500 fpm (455 m/m).
- 1930 Work force reaches 550. Machine widths approached 160" 11.
- 1931 Alonzo Aldrich dies. Elbert Neese Sr. becomes President of Beloit Iron Works.
- 1931 Due to the great depression and slump in business the work force is reduced to 180.
- 1937 With improvement in business the work force steadily increases to 600 people.
- 1941 Beloit Iron Works starts production of war material.
- 1942 Almost all of Beloit Iron Works Production is devoted to the war effort making turning lathes, boring machines, powder mills and corvette ship engines. Beloit Iron Works is awarded the Army-Navy "E" for excellence and receives three additional awards in later years.
- 1946 Post war work force increases to approximately 1,000 people.
- 1947 Beloit tissue machine operates at 2800 FPM, board machine operates over 500 FPM. Work force reaches l,300 employees.
- 1948 Work force increases to 1,450 employees.
- 1949 Beloit Iron Works opens a sales office in Paris, France.
- 1950 Beloit manufactures first tissue machine to achieve 3000 FPM (915 M/M). Adds the differential drive to the product line.
- 1952 Elbert Neese Sr. becomes chairman and Harry C. Moore becomes president. Work force reaches about 1,700 people. Introduces the Air Cushioned Inlet.
- 1953 Sales offices are opened in Portland, Oregon and Mobile, Alabama. Introduces Suction Roll Silencing.
- 1954 Beloit builds the Inverform former
- 1955 Beloit acquires E.D. Jones of Pittsfield, MA, Downingtown Manufacturing Co. of Downingtown, PA and a factory in Pinerolo, Italy. Beloit introduces the Suction Pickup.
- 1956 The Twinver press is introduced.
- 1956 Winder, Reels, Sheeter, Coater, Supercalender and film extruder product lines moved from Beloit to Downingtown and an engineering and sales force dedicated to finishing product lines is established.
- 1958 Beloit machines are being built in England, Japan & Spain. Develops the Flo-Vac and develops the first rereeler to process edited jumbos to increase finishing operations efficiency.
- 1959 Beloit introduces the Controlled Crown Roll for sheet profiling and the Ribbed Yankee.
- 1960 Beloit develops the Flooded Nip Coater .
- 1960–1971 Breakthroughs at the Downingtown Research Center in winding include: Load cell tension controlled TNT winding concept, Rhometer roll tester, Biwind duplex winder, Pos-Z dual spreader, Low inertia sectional paper rolls, Web-driven slitters, Large winder drum winding concept, Use of Venta-grooving on paper rolls and winder drums, Portable winder analyzer and Remote Position Slitters. It was during this time period that Beloit received worldwide recognition of clearly defining the fundamentals of winding technology.
- 1961 Rockton, Ill Research Facility dedicated. Elbert H. Neese dies August of the same year. The same year the Beloit-Air Cap and the Inclined Size press are introduced.
- 1962 The name of Beloit Iron Works is changed January 1 of this year to Beloit Corporation however the BIW name is slow to disappear. Beloit acquires Sorel industries of Quebec and Walmsley's (Bury) of Bolton, England.
- 1971 Reels, Winders, Coaters, Supercalenders, Film extruder lines, & Injection Molding machine lines transfer from Downingtown, Pa., to Beloit, Wis.
- 1971–1986 Winding Breakthroughs at Beloit, Wis., consist of Super-L Winders development, Auto-Position Slitters, & Automatic Set-Change Winders.
- c.1979 Beloit acquires Lenox Machine in Lenox, Mass., which primarily made precision sheeters.
- 1986 Beloit Corporation acquired by Harnischfeger Industries of Brookfield, Wis.
- 1986 Winder Product Line transfers to Lenox Division, Lenox, Mass.
- 1986–2000 Winding Breakthroughs at Lenox Division consist of Articulating Rider Rolls, Compliant Nip Winding, HTC and HTCS duplex Winders.

== Acquisition by the Nugo Group ==
After Beloit Corporation filed for bankruptcy, the Nugo Group bought up the Italian subsidiary of Beloit Corporation, Beloit Italia which was leading many Beloit's project in Europe. The new owner gave a new name to the company: PMT Italia S.p.A. which stands for Paper Machinery Technology.
