= Marinite =

Shale

Marinite is a gray to dark-gray or black oil shale of marine origin in which the chief organic components are lamalginite and bituminite derived from marine phytoplankton, with varied admixtures of bitumen, telalginite and vitrinite. Marinite deposits are the most abundant oil-shale deposits. They are generally widespread but at the same time they are relatively thin and often of restricted economic importance. Typical environments for marinite deposits are found in epeiric seas (e.g. on broad shallow marine shelves or below inland seas where wave action is restricted and currents are minimal).

The largest marinite-type oil-shale deposits are the Devonian–Mississippian oil-shales deposits in eastern United States. In Canada, the marinite-type of oil-shale deposits include the Devonian Kettle Point Formation and the Ordovician Collingwood Shale of southern Ontario, the Cretaceous Boyne and Favel deposits in the Prairie Provinces of Manitoba, Saskatchewan, and Alberta, and the Anderson Plain and the Mackenzie Delta deposits in the Northwest Territories.

Outside North America, marinite occurs in the Irati Formation in Brazil, deposits in the Middle East and North Africa, and in Sweden.

== See also ==
- Cannel coal
- Kukersite
- Lamosite
- Oil shale geology
- Oil shale in Jordan
- Tasmanite
- Torbanite
