= Oil shale geology =

Branch of geology

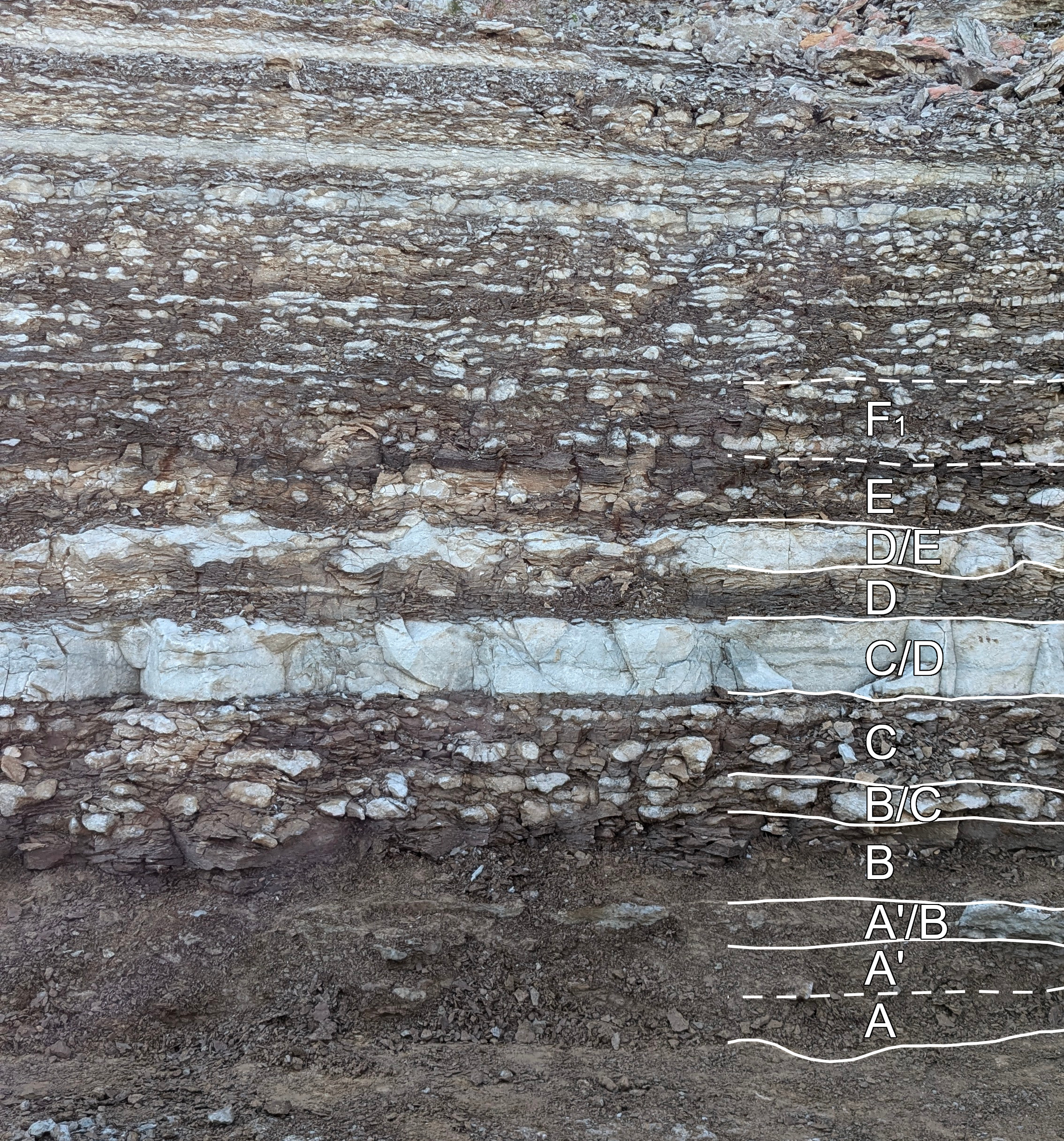
Outcrop of Ordovician kukersite oil shale, northern Estonia

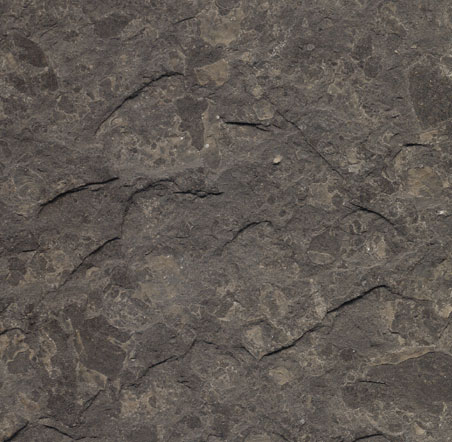
Lower Jurassic oil shale near Holzmaden, Germany

Oil shale geology is a branch of geologic sciences which studies the formation and composition of oil shales–fine-grained sedimentary rocks containing significant amounts of kerogen, and belonging to the group of sapropel fuels. Oil shale formation takes place in a number of depositional settings and has considerable compositional variation. Oil shales can be classified by their composition (carbonate minerals such as calcite or detrital minerals such as quartz and clays) or by their depositional environment (large lakes, shallow marine, and lagoon/small lake settings). Much of the organic matter in oil shales is of algal origin, but may also include remains of vascular land plants. Three major type of organic matter (macerals) in oil shale are telalginite, lamalginite, and bituminite. Some oil shale deposits also contain metals which include vanadium, zinc, copper, and uranium.

Most oil shale deposits were formed during Middle Cambrian, Early and Middle Ordovician, Late Devonian, Late Jurassic, and Paleogene times through burial by sedimentary loading on top of the algal swamp deposits, resulting in conversion of the organic matter to kerogen by diagenetic processes. The largest deposits are found in the remains of large lakes such as the deposits of the Green River Formation of Wyoming and Utah, USA. Oil-shale deposits formed in the shallow seas of continental shelves generally are much thinner than large lake basin deposits.

== Classification and varieties ==
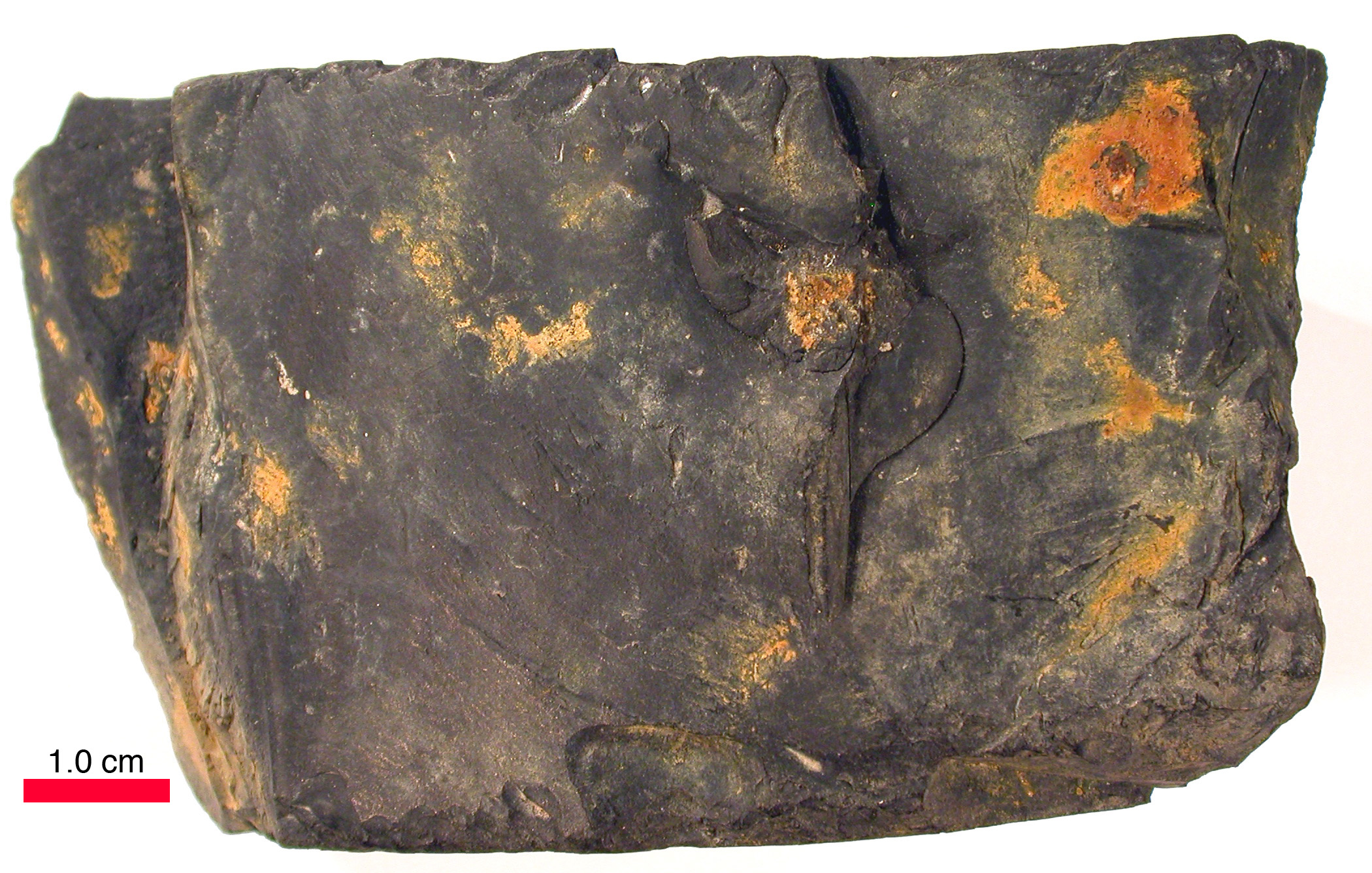
Cannel coal from the Pennsylvanian of northeastern Ohio

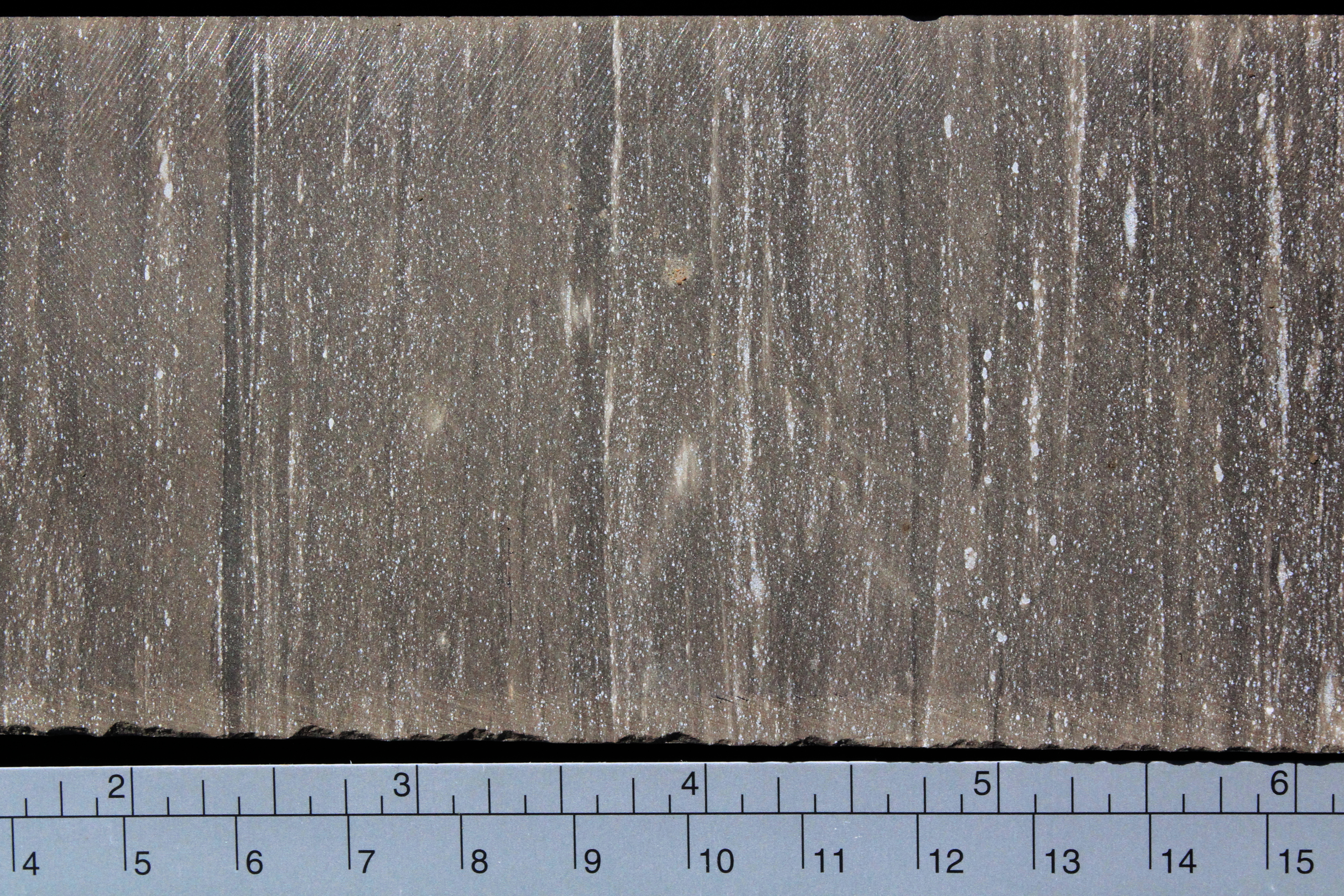
Marinite from Jordan

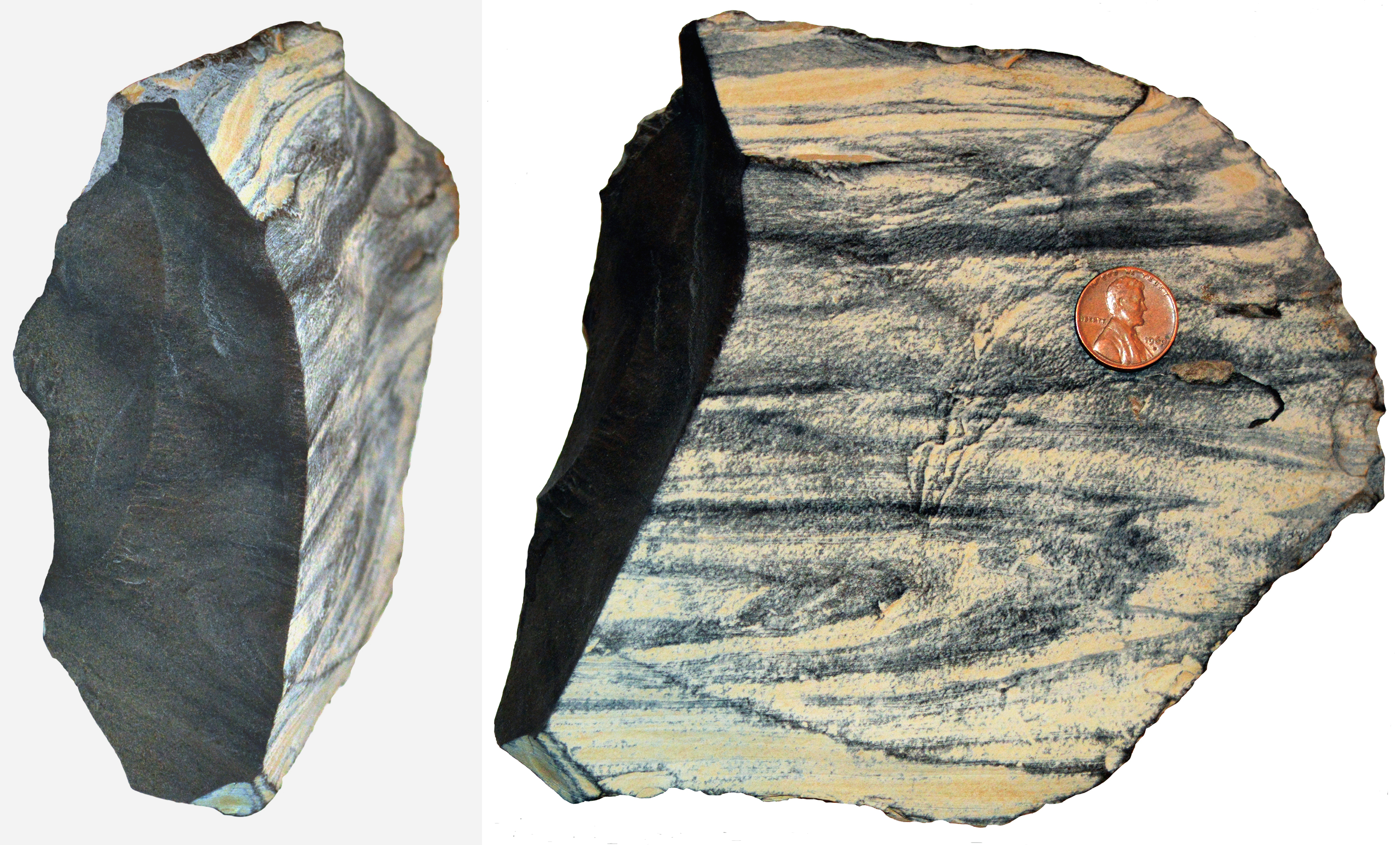
Lamosite from the Mahogany Zone of the Green River Formation, Colorado

Oil shale belongs to the group of sapropel fuels. It does not have a definite geological definition nor a specific chemical formula, and its seams do not always have discrete boundaries. Oil shales vary considerably in their mineral content, chemical composition, age, type of kerogen, and depositional history and not all oil shales would necessarily be classified as shales in the strict sense. Their common feature is low solubility in low-boiling organic solvents and generation of liquid organic products on thermal decomposition.

There are varying classifications of oil shales depending on their mineral content, type of kerogen, age, depositional history, and organisms from which they are derived. The age of the known oil shale deposits ranges from Cambrian to Paleogene age. Lithologies comprise shales and marl and carbonate rocks, all of which form a mixture of tightly bound organic matter and inorganic components.

Oil shales have been divided into three categories based on mineral composition – carbonate-rich shale, siliceous shale and cannel shale. Carbonate-rich shales derive their name from the large amount of carbonate minerals such as calcite and dolomite. As many as twenty carbonate minerals have been found in oil shales, the majority of which are considered authigenic or diagenetic. Carbonate-rich oil shales, particularly that of lacustrine-sourced deposits, have usually the organic-rich layers sandwiched between carbonate-rich layers. These deposits are hard formations that are resistant to weathering and they are difficult to process using ex-situ methods. Siliceous oil shales are usually dark brown or black shales. They are not rich in carbonates but rather in siliceous minerals such as quartz, feldspar, clay, chert and opal. Siliceous shales are not as hard and weather-resistant as carbonate-rich shales, and may be better suited for extraction via ex-situ methods. Cannel shales are usually dark brown or black shales, which consist of organic matter that completely encloses other mineral grains. They are suitable for extraction via ex-situ methods.

Another classification according to the type of kerogen, is based on the hydrogen, carbon, and oxygen content of the original organic matter in the oil shale. This classification is using the Van Krevelen diagram. The most used classification of oil shales was developed between 1987 and 1991 by Adrian C. Hutton of the University of Wollongong, adapting petrographic terms from coal terminology. According to this classification, oil shales are designated as terrestrial, lacustrine (lake-bottom-deposited), or marine (ocean bottom-deposited), based on the environment where the initial biomass was deposited. Hutton's classification scheme has proven useful in estimating the yield and composition of the extracted oil.

Classification of oil shales by environment of deposition
Terrestrial	Lacustrine	Marine
cannel coal	lamosite; torbanite	kukersite; tasmanite; marinite

Cannel coal (also called candle coal) is a type of terrestrial shale, which is hydrogen-rich brown to black coal, sometimes with shaly texture, composed of resins, spores, waxes, cutinaceous and corky materials derived from terrestrial vascular plants as well as varied amounts of vitrinite and inertinite. Lacustrine shales consist of lamosite and torbanite. Lamosite is a pale-brown and grayish-brown to dark-gray to black oil shale whose chief organic constituent is lamalginite derived from lacustrine planktonic algae. Torbanite, named after Torbane Hill in Scotland, is a black oil shale whose organic matter is telalginite derived from lipid-rich Botryococcus and related algal forms. Marine shales consist of three varieties, namely kukersite, tasmanite, and marinite. Kukersite, named after Kukruse in Estonia, is a light-brown marine oil shale whose principal organic component is telalginite derived from the green alga, Gloeocapsomorpha prisca. Tasmanite, named after Tasmania, is a brown to black oil shale whose organic matter consists of telalginite derived chiefly from unicellular tasmanitid algae of marine origin. Marinite is a gray to dark-gray to black oil shale of marine origin in which the chief organic components are lamalginite and bituminite derived from marine phytoplankton with varied admixtures of bitumen, telalginite, and vitrinite.

== Composition ==
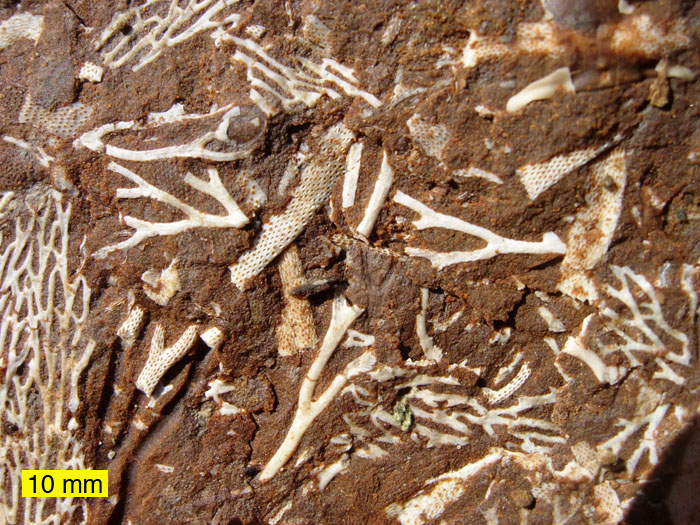
Fossils in Ordovician kukersite oil shale, northern Estonia

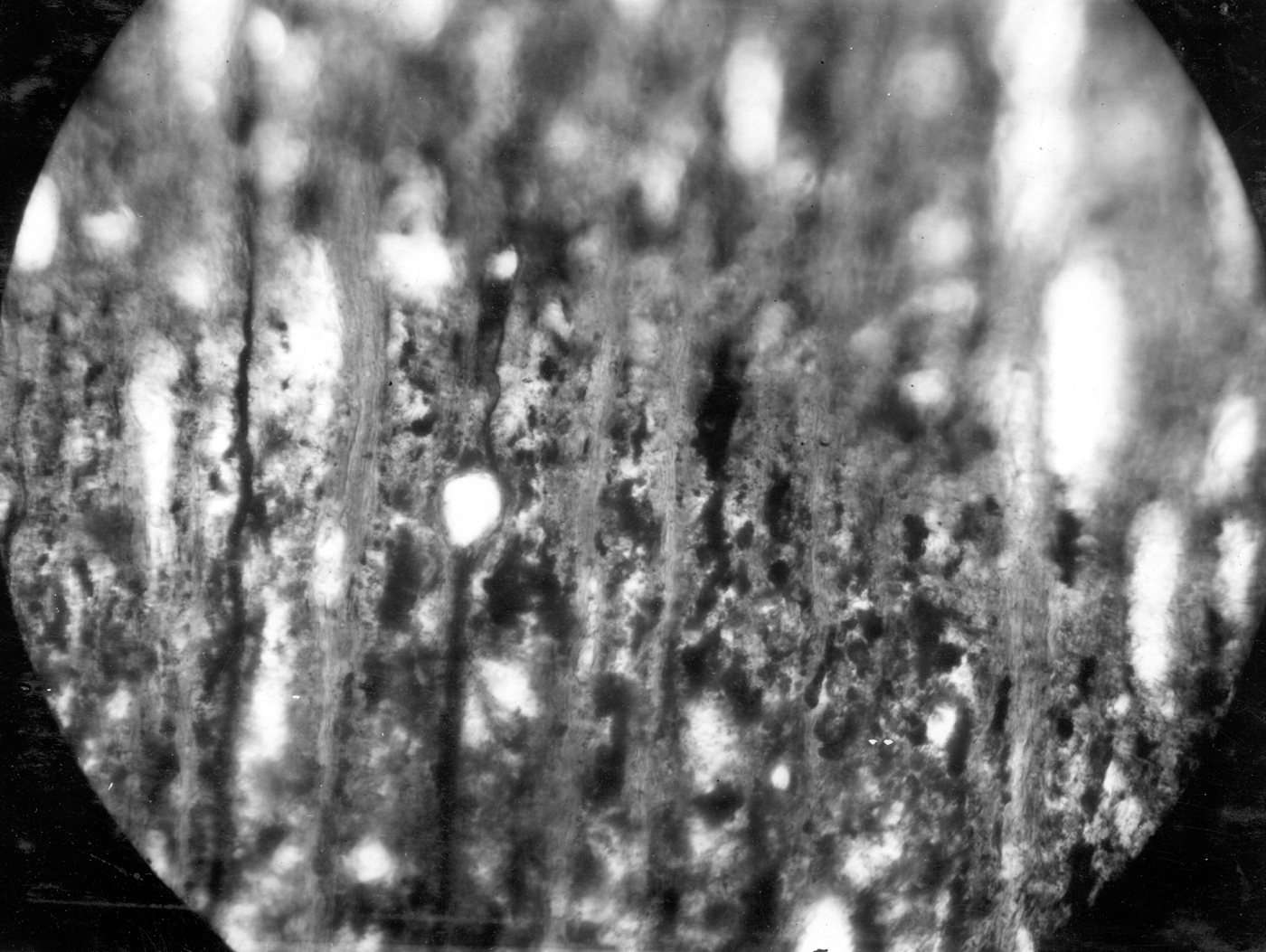
Photomicrograph showing detail of the varves in a rich Colorado oil shale specimen. The organic laminae are themselves finely laminated. The mineral laminae contain considerable organic matter, but they are readily distinguished by their coarser grain and greater thickness. Note sand grains (white). Enlarged 320 diameters.

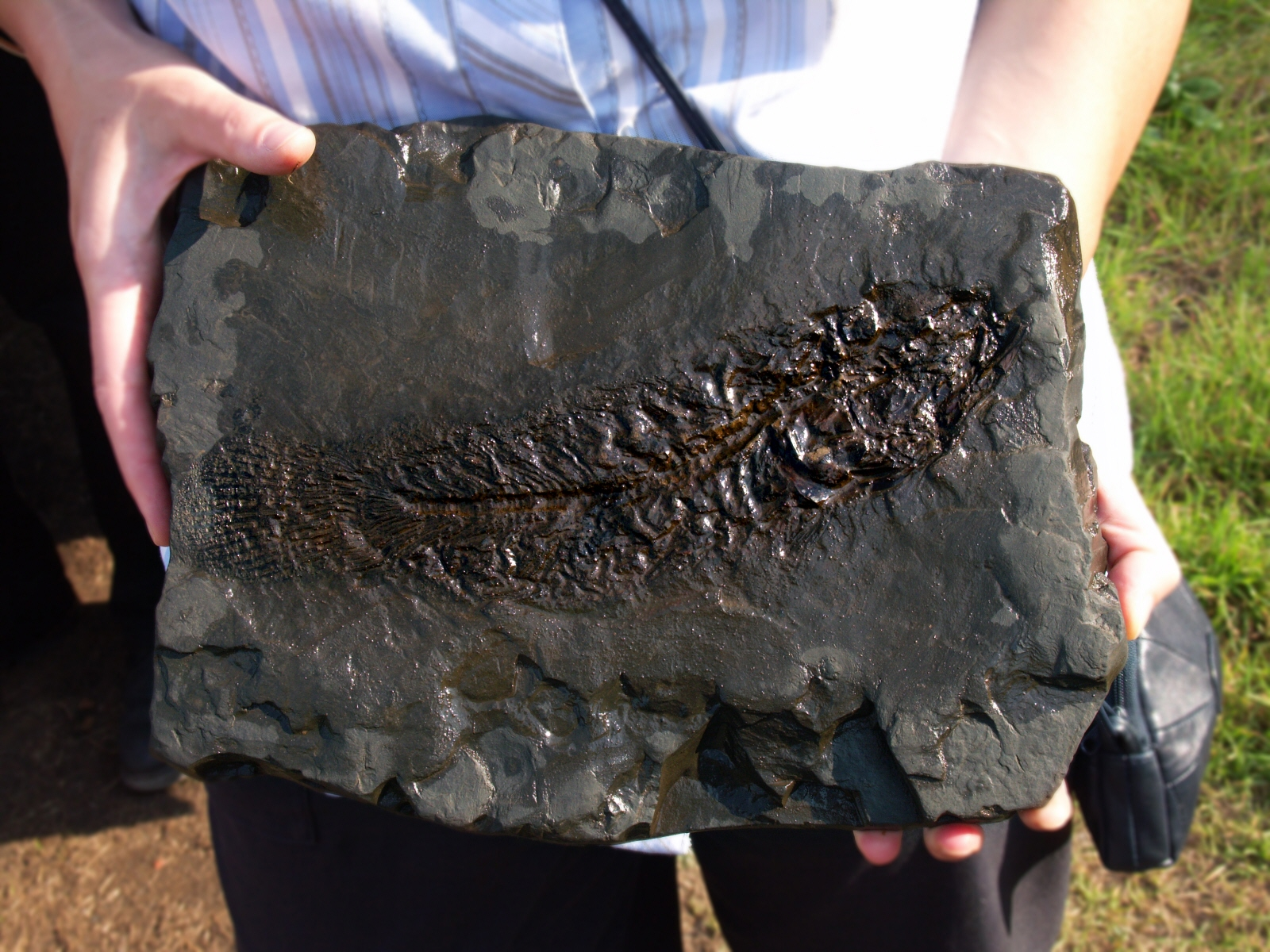
Fossil in oil shale from Messel pit, south of Frankfurt am Main, Germany

As a sapropel fuel, oil shale differs from humus fuels in its lower content of organic matter. The organic matter has an atomic ratio of hydrogen to carbon of about 1.5 – approximately the same as that of crude oil and four to five times higher than coals. The organic matter in oil shales forms a complex macromolecular structure which is insoluble in common organic solvents. It is mixed with varied amounts of mineral matter. For commercial grades of oil shale, the ratio of organic matter to mineral matter is about 0.75:5 to 1.5:5.

The organic portion of oil shale consists largely of a pre-bitumen bituminous groundmass, such as remains of algae, spores, pollen, plant cuticles and corky fragments of herbaceous and woody plants, and cellular debris from other lacustrine, marine, and land plants. While terrestrial oil shales contain resins, spores, waxy cuticles, and corky tissues of roots and stems of vascular terrestrial plants, lacustrine oil shales include lipid-rich organic matter derived from algae. Marine oil shales are composed of marine algae, acritarchs, and marine dinoflagellates. Organic matter in oil shale also contains organic sulfur (about 1.8% on average) and a lower proportion of nitrogen.

Three major types of organic matter (macerals) in oil shale are telalginite, lamalginite, and bituminite. Telalginite is defined as structured organic matter composed of large colonial or thick-walled unicellular algae such as Botryococcus and Tasmanites. Lamalginite includes thin-walled colonial or unicellular algae that occur as distinct laminae, but display few or no recognizable biologic structures. Under the microscope, telalginite and lamalginite are easily recognized by their bright shades of yellow under ultraviolet/blue fluorescent light. Bituminite is largely amorphous, lacks recognizable biologic structures, and displays relatively low fluorescence under the microscope. Other organic constituents include vitrinite and inertinite, which are macerals derived from the humic matter of land plants. These macerals are usually found in relatively small amounts in most oil shales.

Mineral matter in oil shale contains fine-grained silicate and carbonate minerals such as calcite, dolomite, siderite, quartz, rutile, orthoclase, albite, anorthite, muscovite, amphipole, marcasite, limonite, gypsum, nahcolite, dawsonite and alum. Some oil-shale deposits also contain metals such as vanadium, zinc, copper, and uranium among others.

General composition of oil shales
Inorganic matrix	Bitumens	Kerogens
quartz; feldspars; clays (mainly illite and chlorite; carbonates (calcite and dolomite); pyrite and others	soluble in CS_{2}	insoluble in CS_{2}; containing uranium, iron, vanadium, nickel, molybdenum, etc.

== Formation ==
Most oil shale deposits were formed during Middle Cambrian, Early and Middle Ordovician, Late Devonian, Late Jurassic and Paleogene times. These were formed by the deposition of organic matter in a variety of depositional environments including freshwater to highly saline lakes, epicontinental marine basins and subtidal shelves and were restricted to estuarine areas such as oxbow lakes, peat bogs, limnic and coastal swamps, and muskegs. When plants die in such an anaerobic aquatic environment, low oxygen levels prevent their complete bacterial decay.

For undecayed organic matter to be preserved and to form oil shale, the environment must remain uniform for prolonged periods of time in order to build up sufficiently thick sequences of algal matter. Eventually, the algal swamp or other restricted environment is disrupted and oil shale accumulation ceases. Burial by sedimentary loading on top of the algal swamp deposits converts the organic matter to kerogen by the following normal diagenetic processes:

- Compaction due to sediment loading on the coal, leading to compression of the organic matter.
- With ongoing heat and compaction, removal of moisture in the peat and from the intracellular structure of fossilized plants, and removal of molecular water.
- Methanogenesis—similar to treating wood in a pressure cooker— results in methane being produced, removing hydrogen, some carbon, and some further oxygen.
- Dehydration, which removes hydroxyl groups from the cellulose and other plant molecules, resulting in the production of hydrogen-reduced coals or oil shales.

Though similar in their formation process, oil shales differ from coals in several distinct ways. The precursors of the organic matter in oil shale and coal differ in a sense that oil shale is of algal origin, but may also include remains of vascular land plants that more commonly compose much of the organic matter in coal. The origin of some of the organic matter in oil shale is obscure because of the lack of recognizable biologic structures that would help identify the precursor organisms. Such materials may be of bacterial origin or the product of bacterial degradation of algae or other organic matter.

Lower temperature and pressure during the diagenesis process compared to other modes of hydrocarbon generation result in a lower maturation level of oil shale. Continuous burial and further heating and increased pressure over time could result in the conventional production of oil and gas from the oil shale source rock. The largest deposits are found in the remains of large lakes such as the deposits of the Green River Formation of Wyoming and Utah, USA. Large lake oil shale basins are typically found in areas of block faulting or crustal warping due to mountain building. Deposits such as the Green River may be as much as 2,000 feet (610 m) and yield up to 40 gallons of oil for each ton (166 L/t) of shale.

Oil shale deposits formed in the shallow seas of continental shelves generally are much thinner than large lake basin deposits. These are typically a few meters thick and are spread over very large areas, extending up to thousands of square kilometers. Of the three lithologic types of oil shales, siliceous oil shales are most commonly found in such environments. These oil shales are not as organically rich as lake-deposited oil shales, and generally do not contain more than 30 gallons of extractable oil per ton of oil shale. Oil shales deposited in lagoonal or small lake environments are rarely extensive and are often associated with coal-bearing rocks. These oil shales can have high yields– as much as 40 gallons per ton (166 L/t) of oil shale. However, due to their small areal extent, they are considered unlikely candidates for commercial exploitation.

Properties of some oil shales deposits
Country	Location	Type	Age	Organic carbon (%)	Oil yield (%)	Oil conversion ratio (%)
Australia	Glen Davis, New South Wales	torbanite	Permian	40	31	66
Australia	Tasmania	tasmanite	Permian	81	75	78
Brazil	Irati Formation, Irati	marinite	Permian		7.4	
Brazil	Paraíba Valley	lacustrine shales	Permian	13–16.5	6.8–11.5	45–59
Canada	Nova Scotia	torbanite; lamosite	Permian	8–26	3.6–19	40–60
China	Fushun	cannel coal; lacustrine shales	Eocene	7.9	3	33
Estonia	Estonia Deposit	kukersite	Ordovician	77	22	66
France	Autun, St. Hilarie	torbanite	Permian	8–22	5–10	45–55
France	Creveney, Severac		Toarcian	5–10	4–5	60
South Africa	Ermelo	torbanite	Permian	44–52	18–35	34–60
Spain	Puertollano	lacustrine shale	Permian	26	18	57
Sweden	Kvarntorp	marinite	Lower Paleozoic	19	6	26
United Kingdom	Scotland	torbanite	Carboniferous	12	8	56
United States	Alaska		Jurassic	25–55	0.4–0.5	28–57
United States	Green River Formation in Colorado, Wyoming and Utah	lamosite	Early to Mid Eocene	11–16	9–13	70
United States	Mississippi	marinite	Devonian			

=== Formations in the United States ===
The United States has two significant oil shale deposits which are suited for commercial development due to their size, grade and location. The Eocene-epoch Green River Formation covers parts of Colorado, Wyoming and Utah; the second significant deposit is Devonian oil shales in the eastern United States. In both places, there are sub-basins varying in volume and quality of the reserves. Oil shale in the Green River Formation is found in five sedimentary basins namely, Green River, Uinta, Piceance Creek, Sand Wash and Washakie. The first three have undergone some significant exploration and attempts to commercialize the oil shale reserves since the 1960s. The Green River Formation includes deposits from two large lakes which covered an estimated area of over 65,000 square kilometres (25,100 sq mi) during the Early to Middle Eocene. These lakes were separated by the Uinta uplift and the Axial Basin anticline. For significant periods during their 10 Ma life, the lakes became closed systems allowing many changes in size, salinity and sedimentation. The deposition of oil shales resulted from abundant blue-green algae that thrived in the lakes.

The oil shale that underlies almost 750,000 square kilometres (289,580 sq mi) in the eastern United States was formed in a marine depositional environment, very different from the Green River Basins. These deposits have also undergone commercialization attempts; they are also resources for natural gas and have been mined for low-grade oil shale. These oil shales were formed during the Late Devonian and Early Mississippian periods. During this time, much of the eastern United States was covered by a large shallow sea. The oil shale is thought to have been the result of slow deposition of planktonic algae, under anoxic conditions. In parts of the basin close to the shoreline, the organic mixture that helped form the oil shale contains organic-rich sediment from the rising Appalachian Mountains.

=== Formations in Brazil ===
Brazil has nine significant locations of oil shale deposits. The size, location and quality of oil shale deposits in the Paraíba Valley and the Irati Formation have attracted the most attention. These two contain an estimated 1.4 billion barrels of in-situ shale oil with total resources as much as more than three billion barrels. While the "Irati formation" deposit is the smaller of the two, containing an estimated 600 million barrels in-situ compared to 840 million in the Paraíba Valley formation, the former is more economically viable.

The Irati Formation consists of two oil shale beds separated by 12 metres (40 ft) of limestone and shale. The upper layer is thicker (9 metres (30 ft)) but the thinner lower bed (4 metres (10 ft)) is of greater value; the weight percent of shale oil yield is around 12% for the lower layer as compared to 7% for the upper one. The oil shale yield varies laterally, and may be as little as 7% for the lower layer and 4% for the upper layer. The formation is a very fine grained and laminated deposit ranging in color from dark gray to brown to black. While 60–70% of the shale consists of clay minerals, the balance is made up of organic matter.

No consensus has been reached on the exact depositional nature of the Irati oil shale. One theory suggests that the organic material in the Irati oil shale originated from algae deposited in a lacustrine environment with salinity varying from that of freshwater to brackish water. Other theory suggests that the organic sediment may have been deposited in a shallow, partially restricted marine environment. Hutton's classification describes it as a marine source oil shale.

=== Formation in Estonia ===
The kukersite oil shale of Ordovician age in Estonia is part of the Baltic oil shale basin and was deposited in shallow marine environments. The deposit is one of the world’s highest-grade deposits with more than 40% organic content and 66% conversion ratio into shale oil and gas. The oil shale is located in a single calcareous layer 2.5 to 3 metres (8.2 to 9.8 ft) in thickness and is buried at depths from 7 to 100 metres (23 to 328 ft). The total area of the basin is about 3,000 square kilometres (1,200 sq mi). Oil yield from Kukersite is 30 to 47%. Most of the organic matter is derived from the fossil green alga, Gloeocapsomorpha prisca, which has affinities to the modern cyanobacterium, Entophysalis major, an extant species that forms algal mats in inter-tidal to very shallow subtidal waters. Matrix minerals include low-magnesium calcite, dolomite, and siliciclastic minerals. It is not enriched in heavy metals.

== Reserves ==
As source rocks for most conventional oil reservoirs, oil shale deposits are found in all world oil provinces, although most of them are too deep to be exploited economically. As with all oil and gas resources, analysts distinguish between oil shale resources and oil shale reserves. "Resources" refers to all oil shale deposits, while "reserves", represents those deposits from which producers can extract oil shale economically using existing technology. Since extraction technologies develop continuously, planners can only estimate the amount of recoverable kerogen. Although resources of oil shale occur in many countries, only 33 countries possess known deposits of possible economic value. Well-explored deposits, potentially classifiable as reserves, include the Green River deposits in the western United States, the Tertiary deposits in Queensland, Australia, deposits in Sweden and Estonia, the El-Lajjun deposit in Jordan, and deposits in France, Germany, Brazil, China, southern Mongolia and Russia. These deposits have given rise to expectations of yielding at least 40 liters of shale oil per tonne of oil shale, using the Fischer Assay.

A 2008 estimate set the total world resources of oil shale at 689 gigatons — equivalent to yield of 4.8 trillion barrels (760 billion cubic metres) of shale oil, with the largest reserves in the United States, which is thought to have 3.7 trillion barrels (590 billion cubic metres), though only a part of it is recoverable. According to the 2010 World Energy Outlook by the International Energy Agency, the world oil shale resources may be equivalent of more than 5 trillion barrels (790 billion cubic metres) of oil in place of which more than 1 trillion barrels (160 billion cubic metres) may be technically recoverable. For comparison, the world's proven conventional oil reserves were estimated at 1.317 trillion barrels (209.4×10^{9} m^{3}), as of 1 January 2007. The largest known commercial deposits in the world occur in the United States in the Green River Formation, which covers portions of Colorado, Utah, and Wyoming; about 70% of this resource lies on land owned or managed by the United States federal government. Deposits in the United States constitute 62% of world resources; together, the United States, Russia and Brazil account for 86% of the world's resources in terms of shale-oil content. These figures remain tentative, with exploration or analysis of several deposits still outstanding. Professor Alan R. Carroll of University of Wisconsin–Madison regards the Upper Permian lacustrine oil-shale deposits of northwest China, absent from previous global oil shale assessments, as comparable in size to the Green River Formation.

== See also ==
- Oil shale industry
- Oil shale reserves
