= Lamosite =

Lamosite is an olive-gray brown or dark gray to brownish black lacustrine-type oil shale, in which the chief organic constituent is lamalginite derived from lacustrine planktonic algae. In minor scale it also consists of vitrinite, inertinite, telalginite, and bitumen.

Lamosite deposits are the most abundant and largest oil shale deposits beside of marinite deposits. The largest lacustrine-type oil shale deposits are the Green River Formation in western United States, a number deposits in eastern Queensland, Australia, and the New Brunswick Albert Formation and several other deposits in Canada.

== See also ==
- Cannel coal
- Kukersite
- Marinite
- Tasmanite
- Torbanite
- Oil shale geology
