= Torbanite =

Type of fine-grained black oil shale

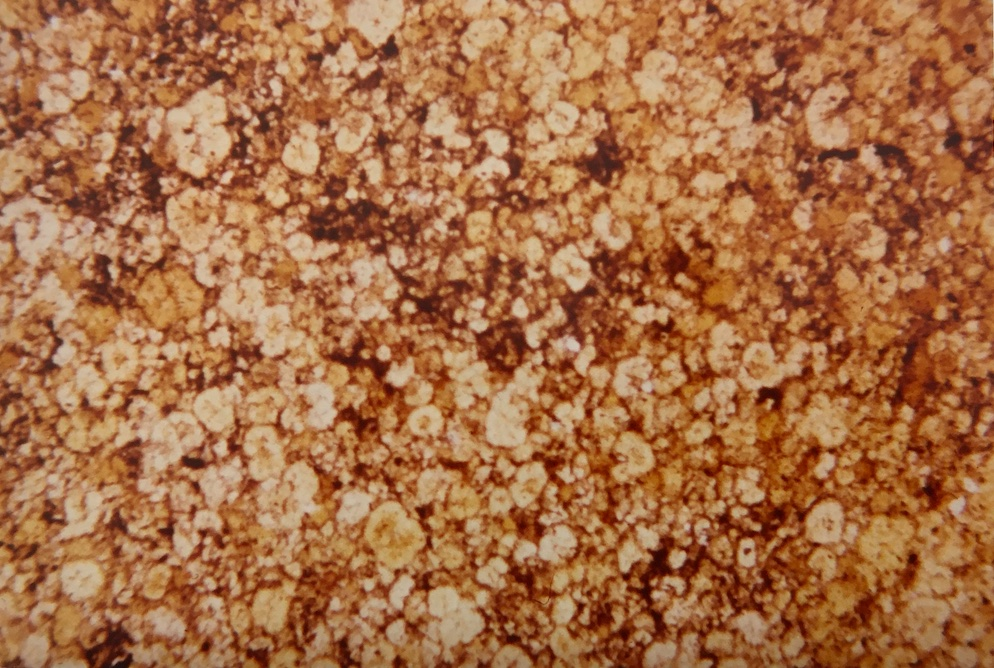
Photomicrograph of torbanite, from Bathgate, Scotland

Torbanite, also known historically as boghead coal or kerosene shale, is a variety of fine-grained black oil shale. It usually occurs as lenticular masses, often associated with deposits of Permian coals. Torbanite is classified as lacustrine type oil shale. A similar mineral, cannel coal, is classified as being a terrestrial form of oil shale, not a lacustrine type.

Torbanite is named after Torbane Hill in Bathgate in West Lothian, Scotland, a major location of occurrence. Torbanite found in Bathgate may have formations of bathvillite found within it. Historically, two other names have been used for torbanite. Boghead coal is named after Boghead estate, also in Bathgate, Scotland. In Australia, the historical name for torbanite was kerosene shale.

Other major deposits of torbanite are found in Pennsylvania and Illinois, US, in Mpumalanga Province in South Africa, in the Sydney Basin of New South Wales, Australia, the largest deposit of which is located at Glen Davis, and in Nova Scotia, Canada.

Organic matter (telalginite) in torbanite is derived from lipid-rich microscopic plant remains similar in appearance to the fresh-water colonial green alga Botryococcus braunii. This evidence and extracellular hydrocarbons produced by the alga have led scientists to examine the alga as a source of Permian torbanites and a possible producer of biofuels. Torbanite consists of subordinate amounts of vitrinite and inertinite; however, their occurrence varies depending on deposits.

Torbanite typically comprises 88% carbon and 11% hydrogen. Paraffin oil can be distilled from some forms of torbanite, a process discovered and patented by James Young in 1851.

A rubber-like, elastic, highly-resilient bituminous substance, known as coorongite—classified as an organic-rich sediment and named after the Coorong, a lagoon in South Australia where it was found—was in 1925 identified as a "peat stage" in the formation of torbanite, which suggested the lacustrine and algal origin of torbanite. However, a 1989 study looked at coorongite collected on the shores of the Darwin River Reservoir in the Northern Territory, where Botryococcus braunii B race grows profusely. The authors concluded that torbanite could not be derived from coorongite, because although "torbanite and some coorongites derive from a common algal source, they clearly show distinct structures, as a result of markedly different conditions of early diagenesis of the Botryococcus biomass". Torbanite is characterised by well-separated fossil colonies, while coorongite is not.

== See also ==
- Cannel coal
- Kukersite
- Lamosite
- Marinite
- Tasmanite
- Oil shale geology
