= Kukersite =

Light-brown marine type oil shale of Ordovician age

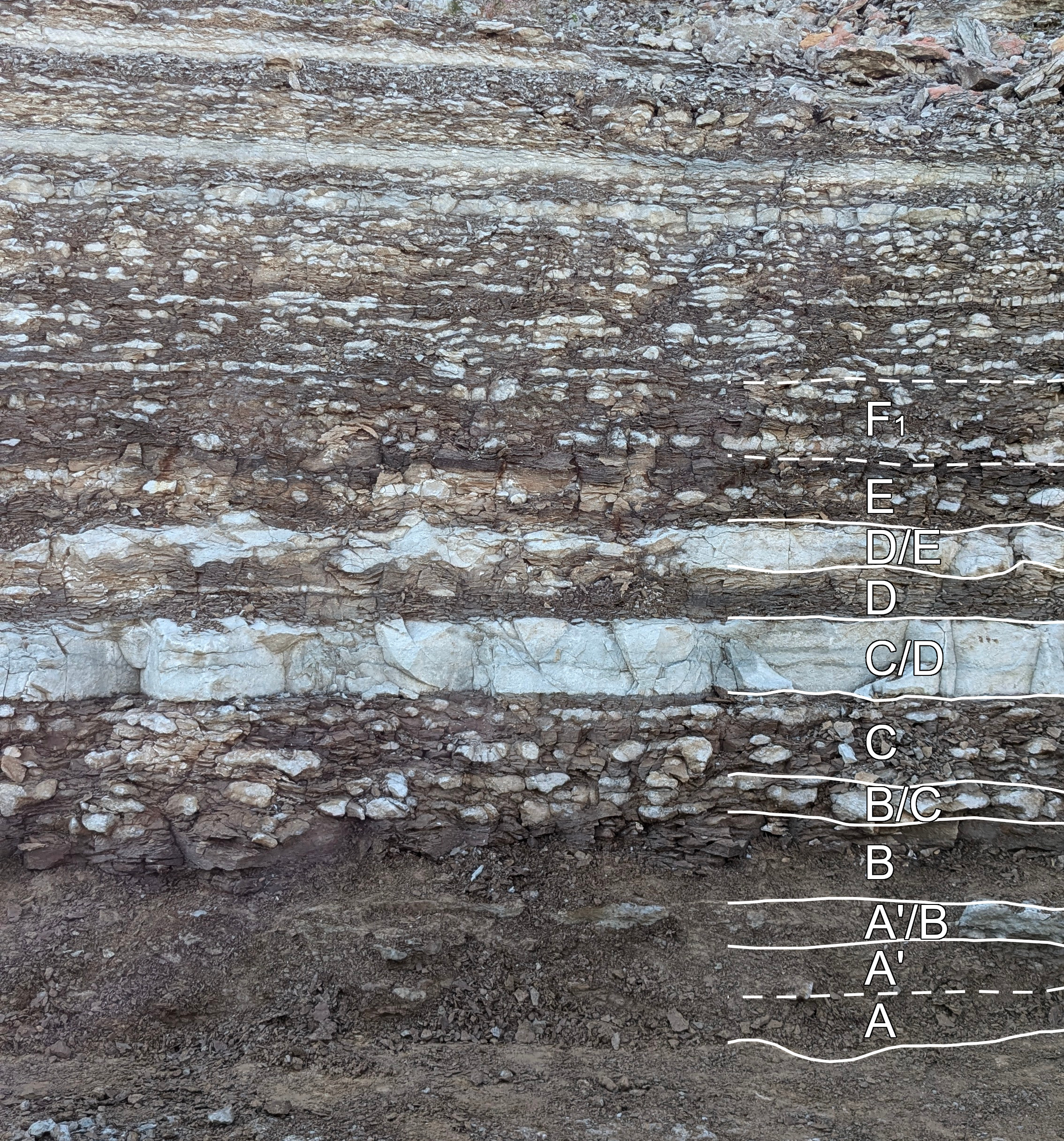
Outcrop of Ordovician kukersite oil shale, northern Estonia

Kukersite is a light-brown marine type oil shale of Ordovician age. It is found in the Baltic Oil Shale Basin in Estonia and North-West Russia. It is of the lowest Upper Ordovician formation, formed some 460 million years ago. It was named after the German name of the Kukruse Manor in the north-east of Estonia by the Russian paleobotanist Mikhail Zalessky in 1917. Some minor kukersite resources occur in sedimentary basins of Michigan, Illinois, Wisconsin, North Dakota, and Oklahoma in North America and in the Amadeus and Canning basins of Australia.

== Baltic Oil Shale Basin ==
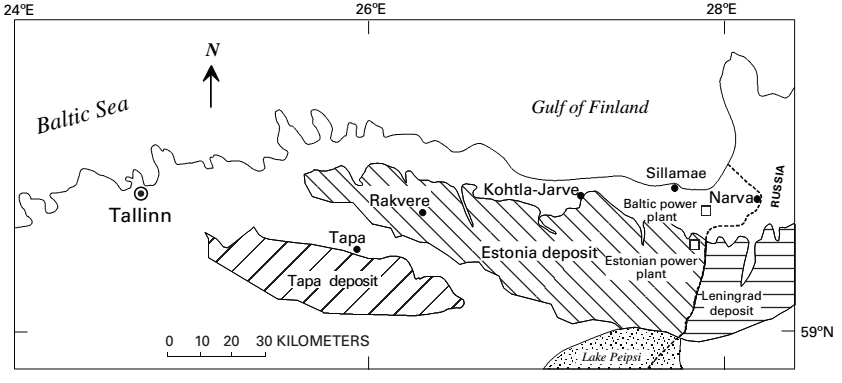
Location of the kukersite deposits within the Baltic Oil Shale Basin in northern Estonia and Russia

The Baltic Oil Shale Basin covers about 3,000 to 5,000 square kilometres (1,200 to 1,900 sq mi). Main kukersite deposits are Estonian and Tapa deposits in Estonia, and Leningrad deposit in Russia (also known as Gdov or Oudova deposit). Other occurrences in Russia are Veimarn and Chudovo–Babinskoe deposits. The Estonian deposit, which covers about 2,000 square kilometres (770 sq mi), is exploited industrially; the Tapa deposit is not accounted as reserves due its lower value which makes its extraction economically inexpedient. The Leningrad deposit was exploited industrially but operations have ceased.

== Geology ==
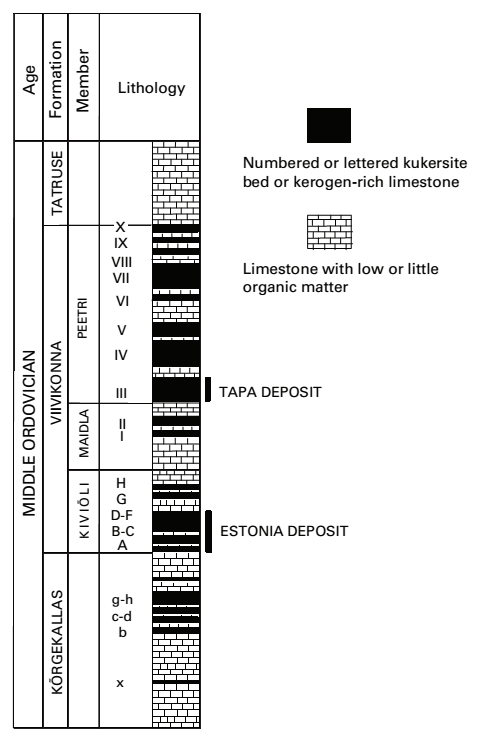
Stratigraphic section of the kukersite deposits.

Kukersite occurs within the Kukruse and Uhaku stages of the Viivikonna and Kõrgekallas formations, as an often calcareous layer. In northern Estonia there are a total of 50 oil shale layers of kukersite, of which six lowest form a 2.5-to-3-metre (8 ft 2 in to 9 ft 10 in) thick mineable bed. In this part kukersite lies near the surface while southward and westward its depth increases and its thickness and quality decreases.

Estonia's kukersite represents about 1.1% of global and 17% of European oil shale resources. The total kukersite resources in Estonia are estimated to be about 4.8 billion tonnes, including about 1 billion tonnes economically proven reserve, 0.3 billion tonnes economic probable reserve and about 3.5 billion tonnes uneconomical proven and probable reserve. Economically proven and probable reserves forms active resource, which is defined as mineable deposits with energy ratings of at least 35 gigajoules per square metre and calorific values of at least 8 MJ/kg, located in areas without environmental restrictions. Energy rating of the oil shale mining block is calculated as the sum of the products of thickness, calorific values and densities of all oil shale layers and limestone interlayers. Up to 50% of active resources are designated as recoverable.

The Leningrad deposit consists of 3.6 billion tonnes of kukersite, including more than one billion tonnes of economically proven and probable reserves.

== Composition ==
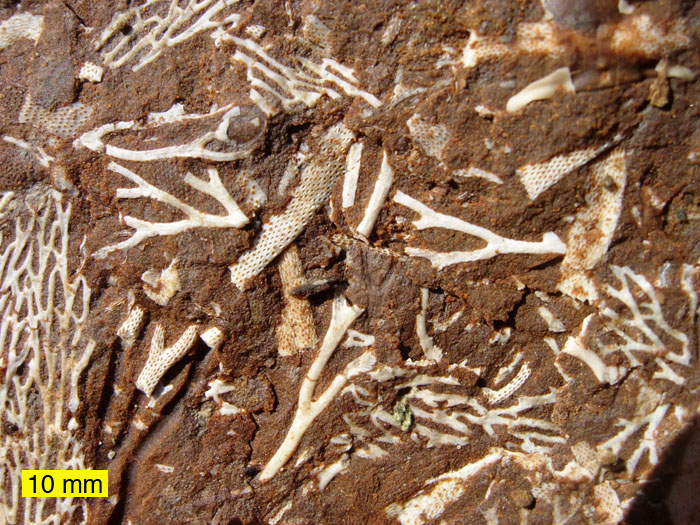
Fossils (various bryozoans) in Ordovician period kukersite oil shale, northern Estonia

Estonian kukersite deposits are one of the world's highest-grade deposits with organic content varying from 15% to 55% with average more than 40%, and it has 65–67% conversion ratio into shale oil and oil shale gas. Fischer Assay oil yield is 30 to 47%. Its organic matter has an atomic ratio of hydrogen to carbon of 1.51 and the mean calorific value of kukersite is 3600 kcal/kg.

The principal organic component of kukersite is telalginite, derived from the fossil green alga, Gloeocapsomorpha prisca, which has affinities with the modern cyanobacterium, Entophysalis major, an extant species that forms algal mats in inter-tidal to very shallow subtidal waters. Matrix minerals dominantly include low-magnesium calcite, dolomite, and siliciclastic minerals. They are not rich in heavy metals. Kukersite was deposited in a shallow marine basin. It lies in the depth of 7 to 170 metres (23 to 558 ft).

== See also ==
- Cannel coal
- Lamosite
- Marinite
- Oil shale in Estonia
- Oil shale geology
- Tasmanite
- Torbanite
