= Bathvillite =

Organic substance

Bathvillite is a naturally occurring organic substance. It is an amorphous, opaque, and very friable material of fawn-brown color, filling cavities in the torbanite or Boghead coal of Bathville, Lothian, Scotland. It has a specific gravity of 1.01, and is insoluble in benzene. It may resemble wood in its final stage of decay.
