= Cannelville, Ohio =

Unincorporated community in Ohio, U.S.

Coordinates: 39°48′50″N 81°59′49″W

Cannelville is an unincorporated community in Muskingum County, in the U.S. state of Ohio.

== History ==
A post office was established at Cannelville in 1908, and remained in operation until 1923. The community was named for cannel coal deposits mined near the original town site.
