= Mikhail Zalessky =

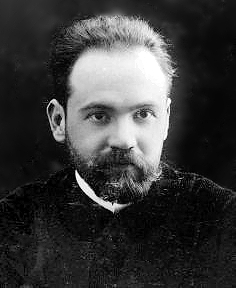
- Mikhail Zalessky in 1907.
- Born: 15 September 1877
- Died: 22 December 1946
- Citizenship: Russian/Soviet Union
- Scientific career
- Fields: Paleobotany

Mikhail Dmitrievich Zalessky (Russian: Михаил Дмитриевич Залесский, Mikhail Dmitrievich Zalesskiy; 15 September 1877 – 22 December 1946) was a Russian paleontologist and paleobotanist. His main focus was an investigation of plant remains in coals and oil shales.

In 1911, Zalessky described a new type of petrified wood from the Donets Basin in Ukraine. He called the wood Callixylon, though he did not find any structures other than the trunk. In the 1960s, it was demonstrated that the fossil wood known as Callixylon and the leaves known as Archaeopteris were actually part of the same plant.

In 1917, he studied kukersite oil shale from Kukruse stage in Estonia. Correspondingly he named that particular oil shale after the German name of the Kukruse manor. Zalessky described oval bodies of kerogen in kukersite which by his conclusion were the remains of an extinct microorganism, which he called Gloeocapsamorpha prisca. This conclusion was criticized in the 1950s but later studies by using electron microscope confirmed Zalessky's observations.
