= Cannel coal =

Type of bituminous coal or oil shale

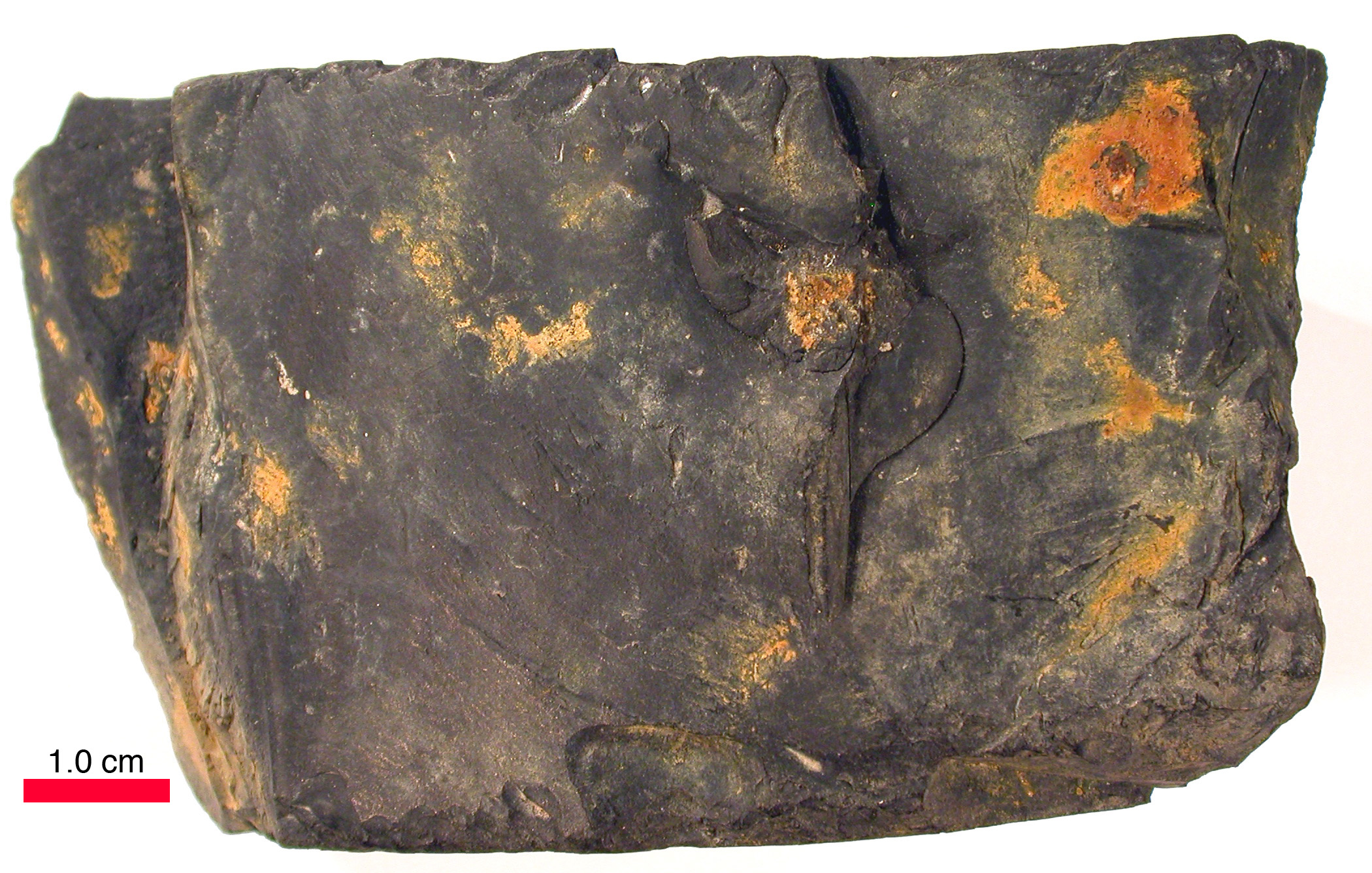
Cannel coal from the Pennsylvanian of NE Ohio

Cannel coal or candle coal is a type of bituminous coal, also classified as terrestrial type oil shale. Due to its physical morphology and low mineral content cannel coal is considered to be coal but by its texture and composition of the organic matter it is considered to be oil shale. Although historically the term cannel coal has been used interchangeably with boghead coal, a more recent classification system restricts cannel coal to terrestrial origin, and boghead coal to lacustrine environments.

== Composition ==
Cannel coal is brown to black oil shale. It comes from resins, spores, waxes, and cutaneous and corky materials of terrestrial vascular plants, in part from Lycopsid (scale tree). Cannel coal was accumulated in ponds and shallow lakes in peat-forming swamps and bogs of the Carboniferous age under oxygen-deficient conditions. Thus cannel coal seams are shallow and often found above other deposits, while the coal itself, being rich in oils, burns long, with a bright yellow flame and little ash. The modern Lycopodiopsida relatives of these lycopsids (scale trees), with their similar high oil content, high surface area spores, are the source of highly flammable lycopodium powder.

Cannel coal is also lower in fixed carbon than typical bituminous coal. It includes various amounts of vitrinite and inertinite. Analytically, cannel coal consists of micrinite, and maceral of the exinite group, and certain inorganic materials.

== History ==
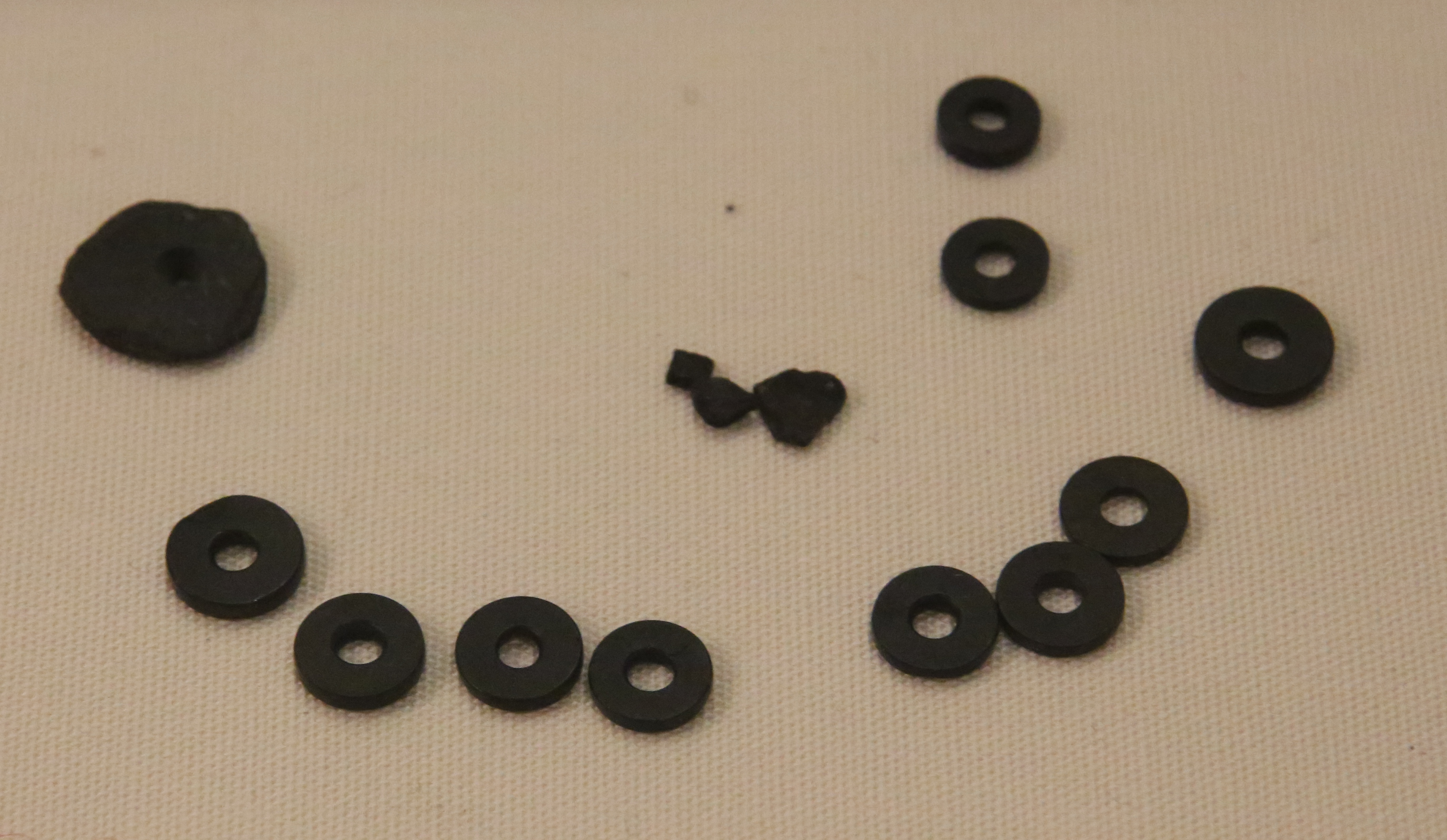
Cannel coal beads

Cannel coal has been used as jewellery since the Neolithic, with pieces appearing in Scotland (often alongside jet) dating from the centuries before 3500BC.

In England a member of the Bradshaigh family discovered a plentiful shallow seam of smooth, hard, cannel coal on his estate, in Haigh, Lancashire in the 16th century. The shallow depth at which it was found meant it was suitable for the simple surface mining methods available at that time. It could be worked and carved, and was prized for fireplaces as an excellent fuel that burned with a bright flame, was easily lit, and left virtually no ash.

Cannel coal commanded a premium price as a grate fuel for use in home fireplaces. It burned longer than wood, and had a clean, bright flame. It is more compact and duller than ordinary coal, and can be worked in the lathe and polished. In the Durham coalfield and elsewhere carving cannel coal into ornaments was a popular pastime amongst the miners.

The excess of hydrogen in a coal, above the amount necessary to combine with its oxygen to form water, is known as disposable hydrogen, and is a measure of the fitness of the coal for use in the manufacture of coal gas. Such coal, although of very small value as fuel, commands a specially high price for gas-making. Cannel coal was used as a major feedstock for the historical manufactured gas industry, as the gas produced from it was valuable for lighting due to the luminosity of the flame it produced. Cannel gas was widely used for domestic lighting throughout the 19th century before the invention of the incandescent gas mantle by Carl Auer von Welsbach in the 1880s. Following the introduction of the gas mantle, cannel coal lost favour as a manufactured gas feedstock as the gas mantle could produce large quantities of light without regard for the flame luminosity of the gas burnt.

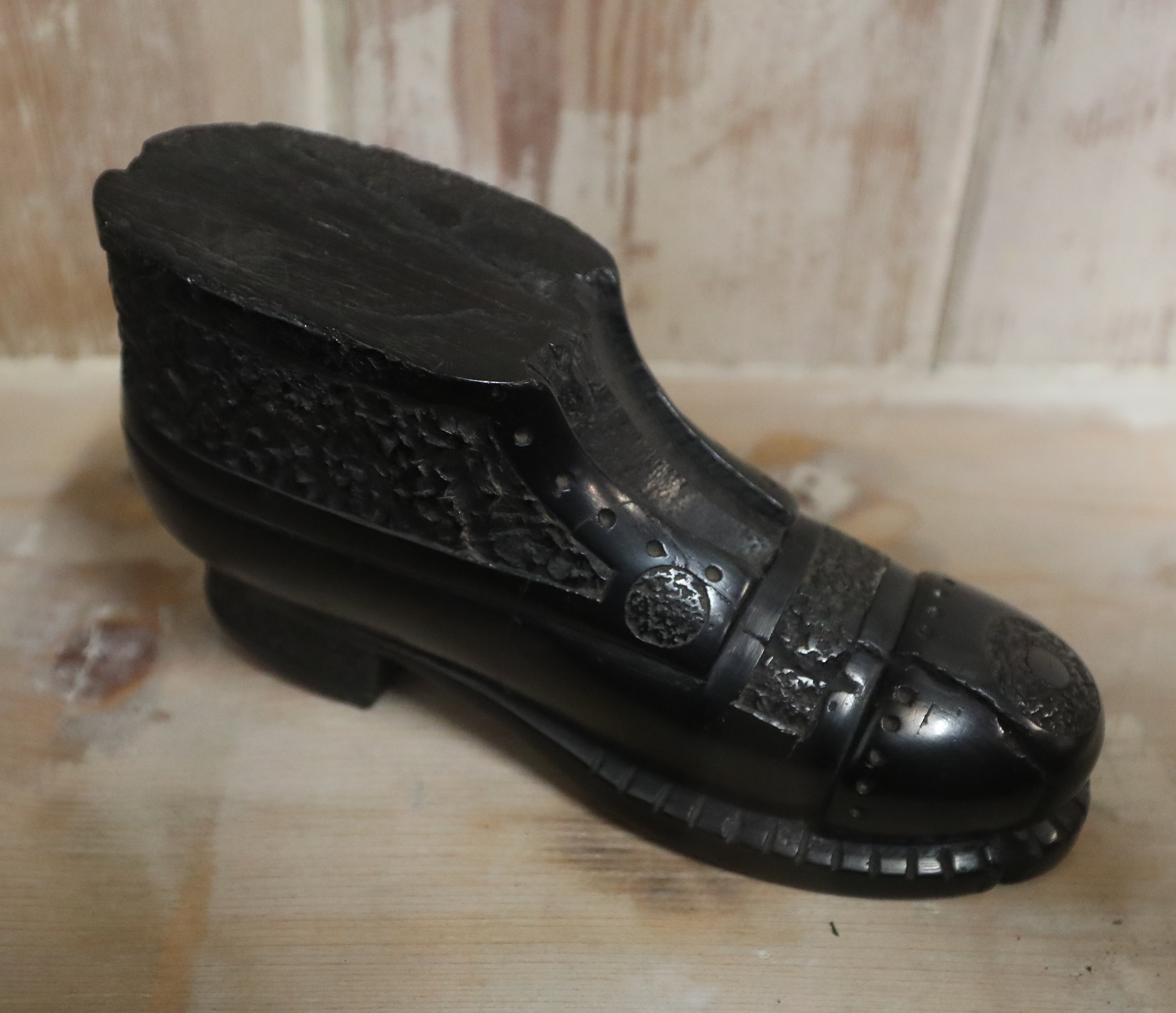
Sculpture of a boot in Cannel coal in the collection of the Black Country Living Museum

On October 17, 1850, James Young, of Glasgow, Scotland, patented a method for the extraction of paraffin (kerosene) from torbanite, a very pure cannel coal. It was widely used from 1850 to 1860 in the manufacture of coal oil, which today would be called shale oil. The principal consumer product was the illuminating oil kerosene. In 1860, there were 55 companies in the United States making coal oil from cannel coal, most of them near the cannel coal mines, in New York, Pennsylvania, Ohio, Kentucky, and western Virginia (now West Virginia). The discovery of petroleum deposits in the US, starting with the Drake Oil Well in 1859, made petroleum a cheaper raw material for making kerosene and drove the American oil shale industry out of business.

In June 1857, a large gathering to celebrate the laying of a foundation stone of a pedestal on which to raise the retired Locomotion No 1 outside the Stockton and Darlington Railway Station (now North Road Station and Darlington Railway Museum - Head of Steam) witnessed that inside a special cavity in the pedestal were laid many items as a time capsule, and a cannel coal box made by a driver of the locomotive, Robert Murray, as a tribute to Edward Pease (often known as the "Father of the Railways").

== See also ==
- Kukersite
- Lamosite
- Marinite
- Oil shale geology
- Tasmanite
- Torbanite

== Bibliography ==
- Ashley, George H. (1918). Cannel Coal in the United States. Bulletin 659 (PDF) (Report). United States Department of the Interior, United States Geological Survey.
- This article incorporates text from a publication now in the public domain: Bauerman, Hilary (1911). "Coal". In Chisholm, Hugh (ed.). Encyclopædia Britannica. Vol. 6 (11th ed.). Cambridge University Press. pp. 574–585.
- Dyni, John R. (2006). Geology and resources of some world oil-shale deposits. Scientific Investigations Report 2005–5294 (PDF) (Report). United States Department of the Interior, United States Geological Survey.
- Han, Zhiwen; Kruge, Michale A.; Crelling, John C.; Bensley, David F. (1999). "Classification of torbanite and cannel coal: I. Insights from petrographic analysis of density fractions". International Journal of Coal Geology. 38 (3): 181–202. Bibcode:1999IJCG...38..181H. doi:10.1016/S0166-5162(98)00013-5. ISSN 0166-5162.
- Hutton, A.C. (1987). "Petrographic classification of oil shales". International Journal of Coal Geology. 8 (3): 203–231. Bibcode:1987IJCG....8..203H. doi:10.1016/0166-5162(87)90032-2. ISSN 0166-5162.
- Speight, James G. (2012). Shale Oil Production Processes. Gulf Professional Publishing. ISBN 9780124017214.
- Stach, Erich (1975). Stach's Textbook of coal petrology (2 ed.). Berlin: Gebrüder Bornträger. ISBN 9783443010188.
