= Bathville =

Village in West Lothian, Scotland

Coordinates: 55.88°N 03.71°W

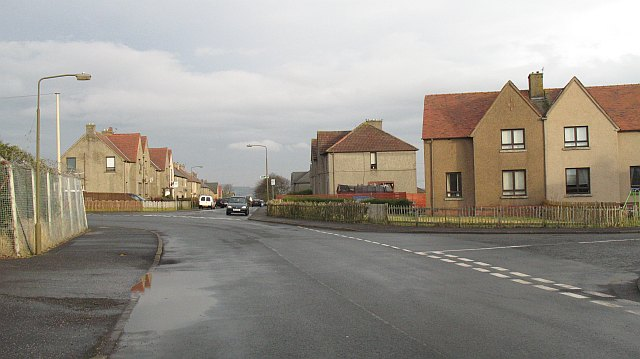
- The road into Bathville

- Location within West Lothian
- OS grid reference: NS9367
- Council area: West Lothian
- Lieutenancy area: West Lothian
- Country: Scotland
- Sovereign state: United Kingdom
- Post town: BATHGATE
- Postcode district: EH48
- Dialling code: 01501
- Police: Scotland
- Fire: Scottish
- Ambulance: Scottish
- UK Parliament: Bathgate and Linlithgow
- Scottish Parliament: Linlithgow

Bathville is a village in West Lothian, Scotland.

Bathville now forms a section of Armadale in West Lothian, it is located (1 km) south of the town centre and 2 miles north of Whitburn. In the middle of the 19th century Bathville comprised only a farm-steading, a coal pit and a row of houses. Today, in addition to housing, there is a business park here.
