= Tasmanite =

Sedimentary rock

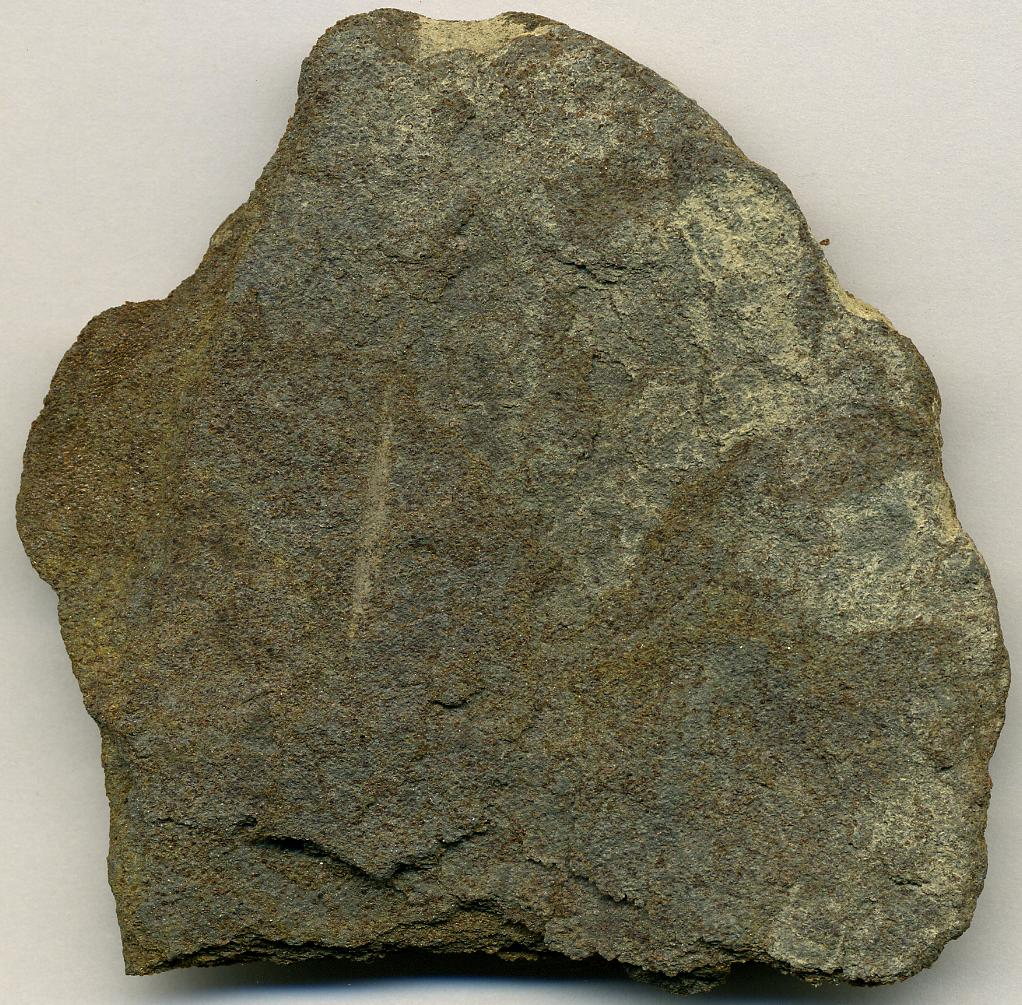
Tasmanite (Quamby deposit)

Tasmanite is a sedimentary rock type almost entirely consisting of the prasinophyte alga Tasmanites. It is commonly associated with high-latitude, nutrient-rich, marginal marine settings found in Tasmania. It is classified as marine type oil shale. It is found in many oil-prone source rocks and, when present, contributes to the oil generation potential of the rock. Some sources also produce a red-brown translucent material similar to amber which has also been called tasmanite.

In 1865, Professor A. J. Church, near the floodplain of the Mersey River (Northern Tasmania), found translucent reddish-brown or brown samples of an unknown mineral resembling amber embedded in shale in one of the small Tasmanite deposits. These differences ultimately amounted to up to 40% of the main rock and had the appearance of narrow, scaly lenses, difficult to separate from the main rock. Professor Church carried out laboratory chemical analysis and made a detailed description of the new mineral, naming it by the same name as the parent rock: Tasmanite. Later, the trivial name “Tasmanian amber” was assigned to it.

== See also ==
- Tasmanian amber
- List of minerals named Tasmanite
- Cannel coal
- Kukersite
- Lamosite
- Marinite
- Torbanite
- Oil shale geology
- List of shale oil operations in Australia (Tasmania)
