= Core Research Center =

U.S. Geological Survey facility in Colorado

The Core Research Center is a facility run by the United States Geological Survey, located in "F" bay in building 810 on the Denver Federal Center campus. It is maintained by the USGS to preserve valuable rock cores, well cuttings and various other geologic samples for use by scientists and educators from government, industry and academia. The CRC is open to the general public for core viewings or tours of the facility by appointment only. The CRC houses the largest collection of rock cores and well cuttings in the nation.

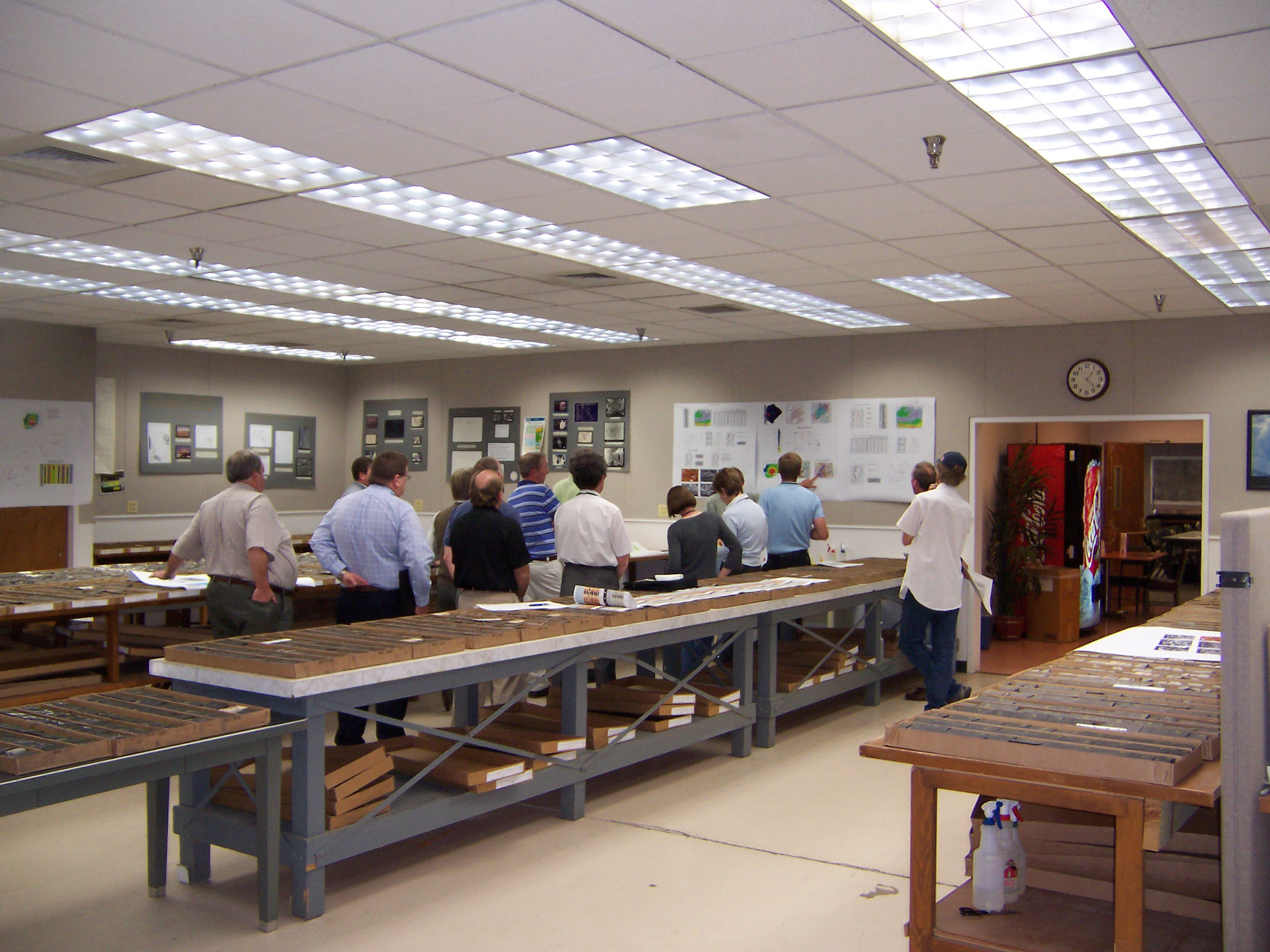
Core workshop at the CRC.

== History ==
Established in 1974 by the USGS, in cooperation with the Rocky Mountain Association of Geologists, the CRC was designed as a permanent free-access core repository. Its goal was to rescue rock cores threatened with disposal or destruction, which continues today with the recent rescue of the Denver Basin drill core from Castle Pines North, Colorado. During the 1990s the CRC staff provided onsite core processing services to active scientific drilling programs.

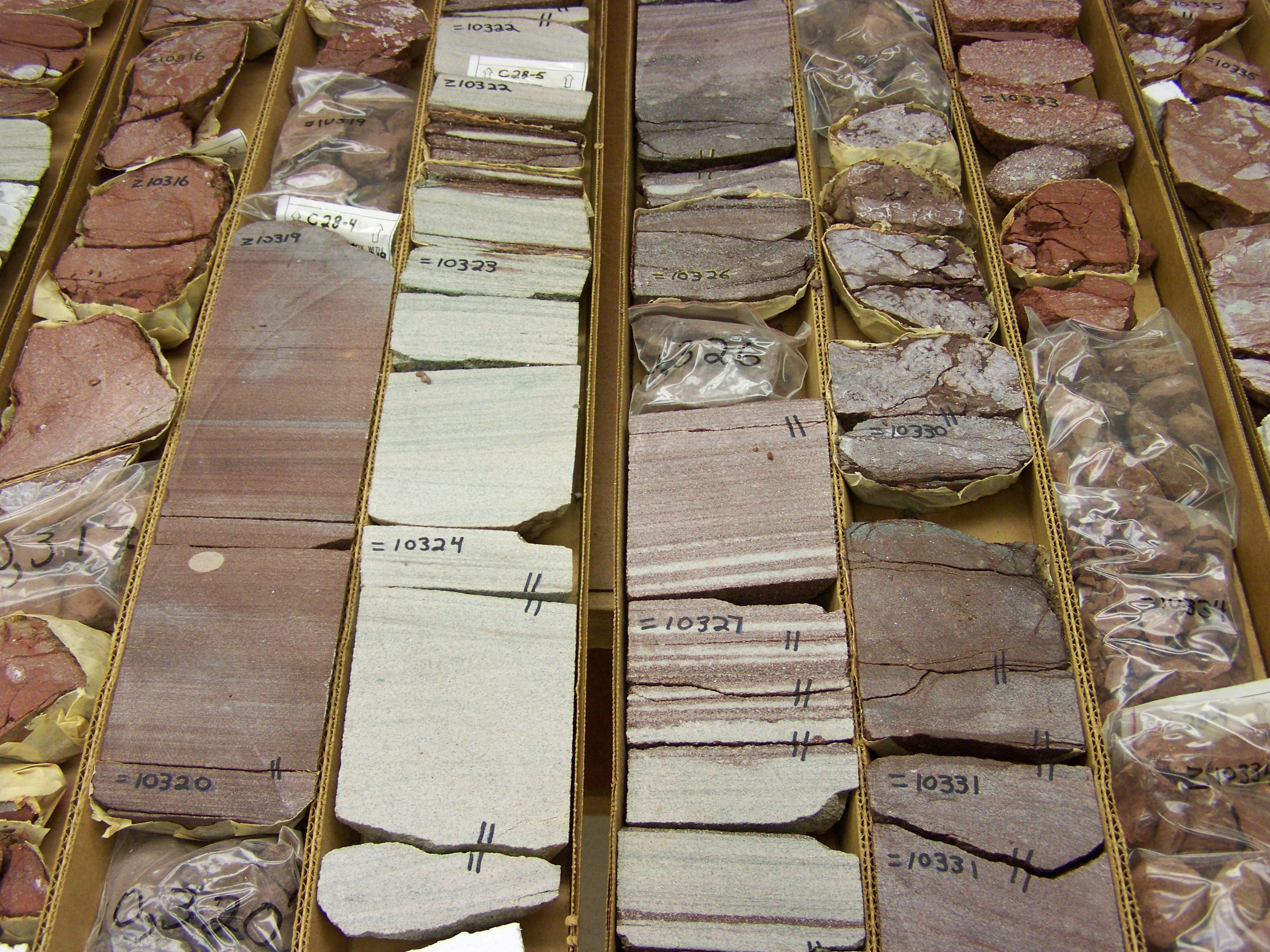
Slabbed section of the Calco #1 Ferch core. Depths are marked on the core in feet.

== Collections ==
=== Archived Core ===
Archived Cores have been slabbed, which means that it has been cut lengthwise, with a rock saw, which exposes a fresh flat surface to enhance the core viewing process. This also enables the cores to boxed and stored like books on a shelf, which allows for quick access to specific depth intervals.

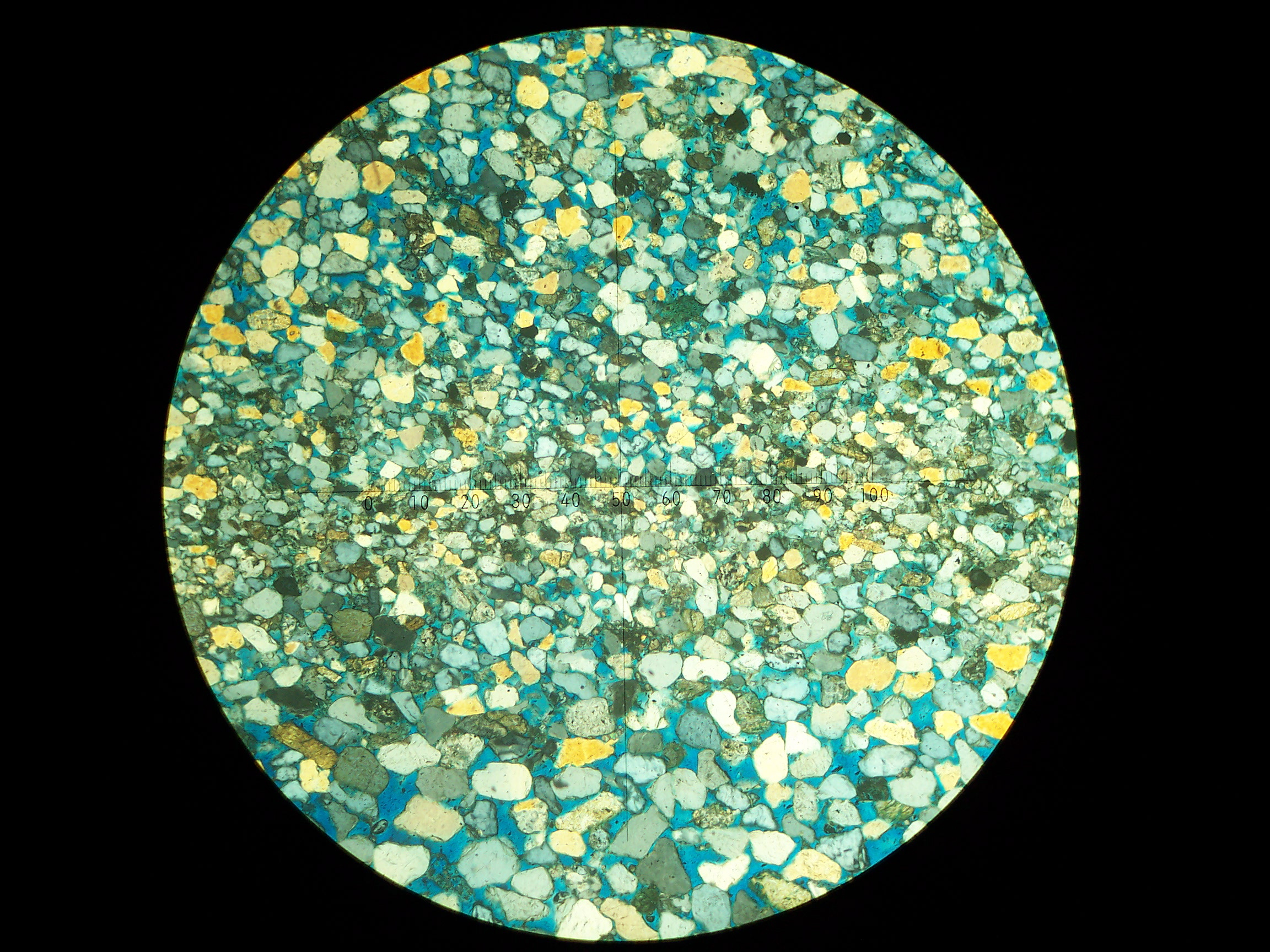
Thin Section of sandstone core as viewed through one of the CRC microscopes.

=== Unprocessed Core ===
The CRC unprocessed core collection contains 1.1 million feet of drilled core, from 31 states. This general collection contains materials from petroleum exploration and energy development holes. Unprocessed cores are in their original boxes and are stored on pallets in the CRC warehouse.

=== Cuttings ===
The CRC curates a large collection of well cuttings (rock chips) brought to the surface during drilling operations. This unique collection of cuttings represents 235 million feet of drilling. The USGS estimates that the replacement cost for this collection is around 10 billion dollars.

=== Special Core Collections ===
Aside from the general petroleum core collection, there are various sub-collections, including Eniwetok Atoll, Cajon Pass, USGS Yellowstone Drilling Program, Manson Impact Structure, plus more.

=== Thin sections, photos, analysis ===
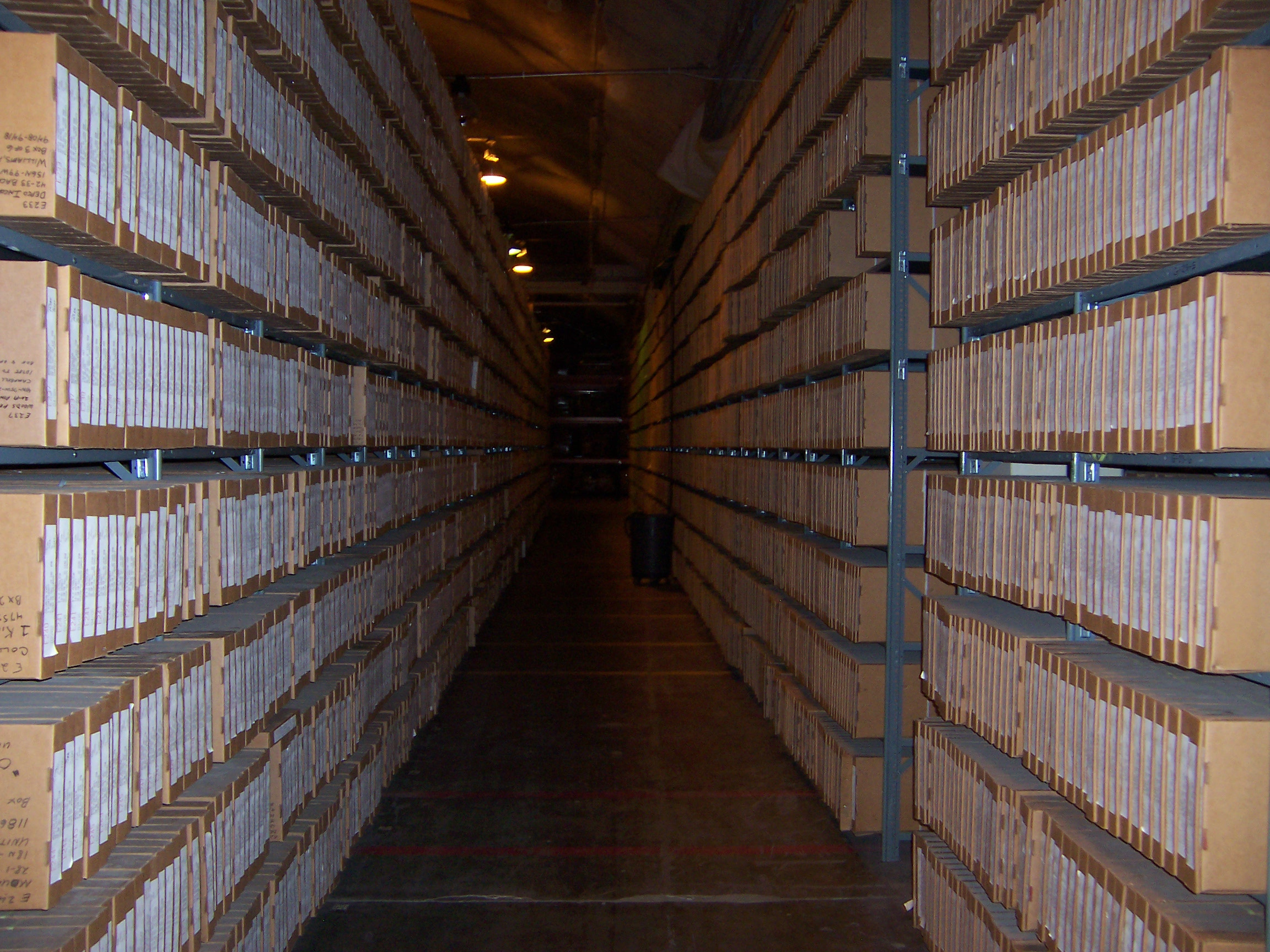
Archived Cores are stored on shelves like books, allowing for quick and easy retrieval.

In addition to the core and cuttings collections, the CRC also houses a collection of over 18,000 thin sections of core and cuttings that are viewed through microscopes by researchers. Photographs of archived cores are also available to researchers. Files are maintained for many wells that contain chemical and physical analyses, core descriptions, stratigraphic charts, and other analyses performed by daily users.

== Oil Shale Collection ==
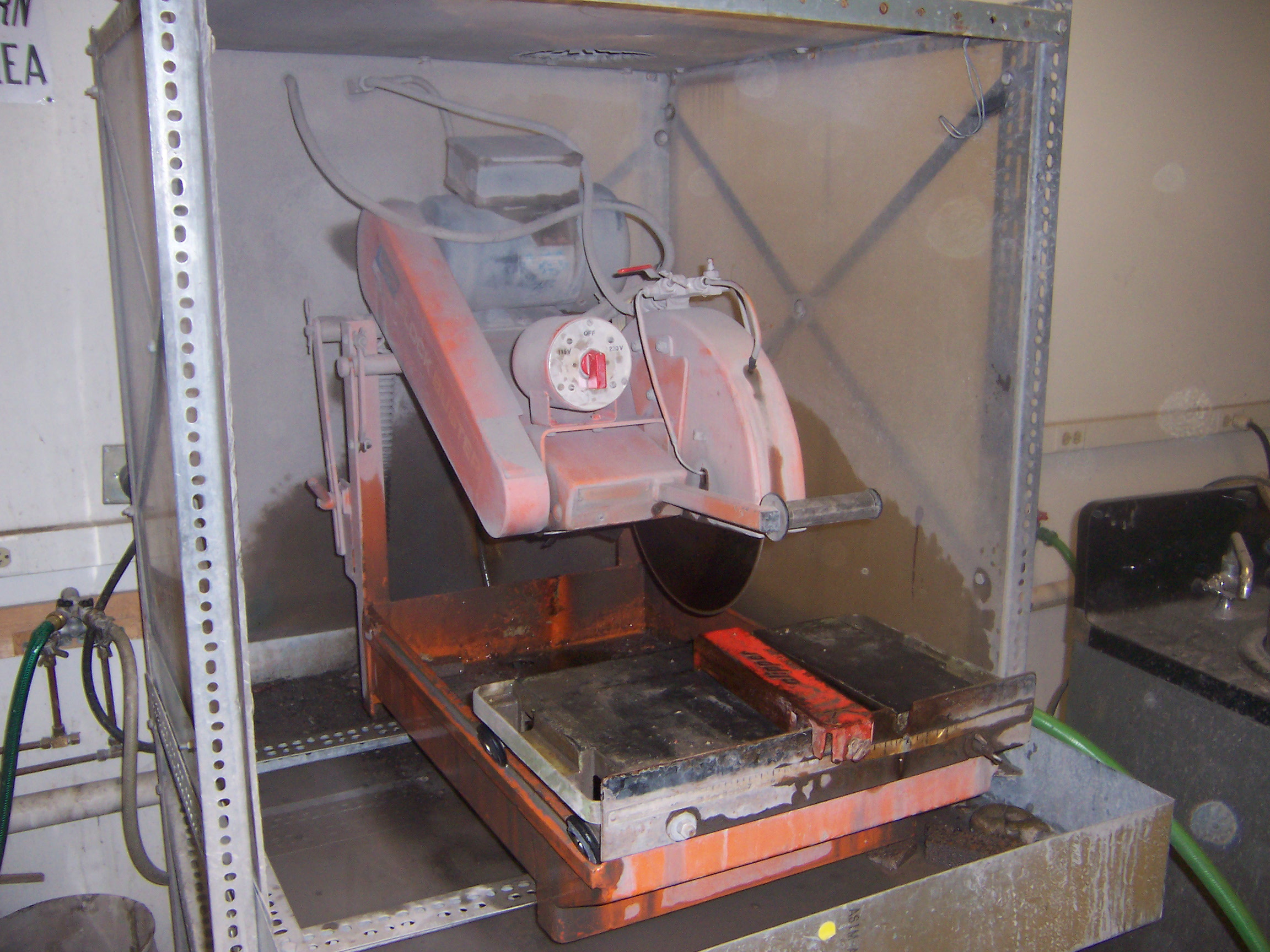
Rock saws are used for cutting samples for researchers.

The Core Research Center has a large collection of drilled materials from the Green River Formation of Western Colorado, Eastern Utah, and Southwestern Wyoming. The collection contains cores from over 400 holes, along with associated thin sections and analytical data.

== Sampling ==
The CRC does allow scientists to remove samples of material stored at the facility. There are special requirements and procedures in place to protect the material from oversampling. Contact the CRC for current procedures.

== National Ice Core Laboratory ==
The CRC shares a common facility with the National Ice Core Laboratory.
