= Lamalginite =

Lamalginite is a structured organic matter (alginite) in sapropel, composed of thin-walled colonial or unicellular algae that occur as distinct laminae, cryptically interbedded with mineral matter. It displays few or no recognisable biologic structures. Lamalginite fluoresces brightly in shades of yellow under blue/ultraviolet light. The term of lamalginite was introduced by Adrian C. Hutton of the University of Wollongong.

== See also ==
- Telalginite
