= Telalginite =

Organic mineral

Telalginite is a structured organic matter (alginite) in sapropel, composed of large discretely occurring colonial or thick-walled unicellular algae such as Botryococcus, Tasmanites and Gloeocapsomorpha prisca. Telalginite is present in large algal bodies. It fluoresces brightly in shades of yellow under blue/ultraviolet light. The term "telalginite" was introduced by Adrian C. Hutton of the University of Wollongong.

== See also ==
- Lamalginite
