= Thermal history modelling =

Thermal history modelling is an exercise undertaken during basin modelling to evaluate the temperature history of stratigraphic layers in a sedimentary basin.

The thermal history of a basin is usually calibrated using thermal indicator data, including vitrinite reflectance and fission tracks in the minerals apatite and zircon.

The temperatures undergone by rocks in a sedimentary basin are crucial when attempting to evaluate the quantity, nature and volume of hydrocarbons (fossil fuels) produced by diagenesis of kerogens (a group of chemicals formed from the decay of organic matter).

Fourier's law provides a simplified one-dimensional description of the variation in heat flow Q as a function of thermal conductivity k and thermal gradient dT/dz:

$$Q=-k\frac{dT}{dz}$$

(The minus sign indicates that heat flows in the opposite direction to increasing depth, that is, towards the Earth's surface.)

If the assumptions used to justify this simplified approximation (i.e. steady-state heat conduction, no convection or advection) are accepted, we define the simple 1-dimensional heat diffusion equation where temperature T at a depth z and time t is given by the equation:

$$T_{z,t} = T_{t}^0 + Q_t \int_0^z\frac{dz'}{k_{z'}}$$

where T_{t}^{0} is the surface temperature history, Q_{t} is the heat flow history and k is thermal conductivity. The integral thus represents the integrated thermal conductivity history of a 1-dimensional column of rock.

Thermal history modelling attempts to describe the temperature history T_{z,t} and therefore requires a knowledge of the burial history of the stratigraphic layers which is obtained through the process of back-stripping.

== See also ==
- Petroleum geology
