= Karst =

Topography from dissolved soluble rocks

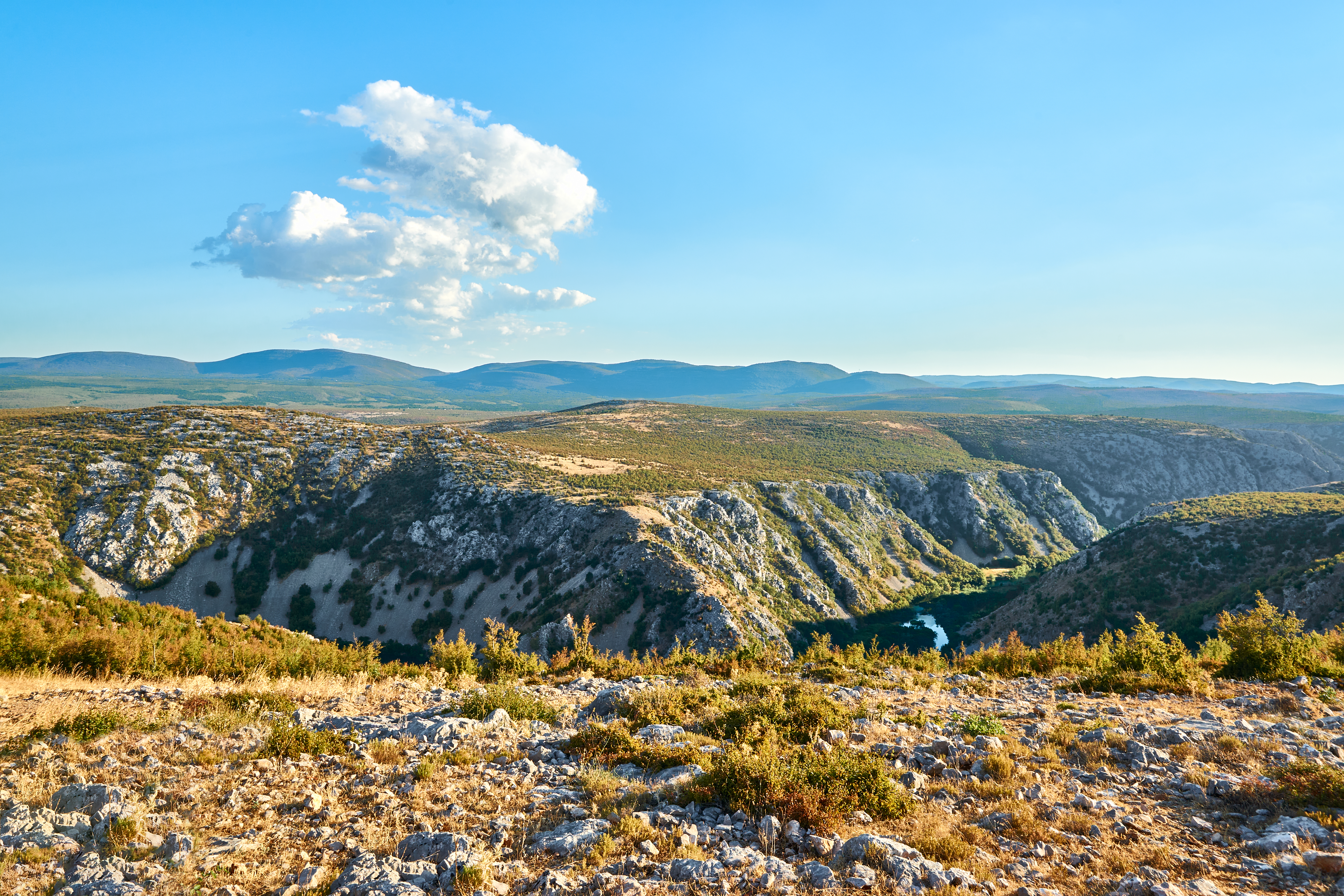
Typical karst terrain of the Dinaric Alps

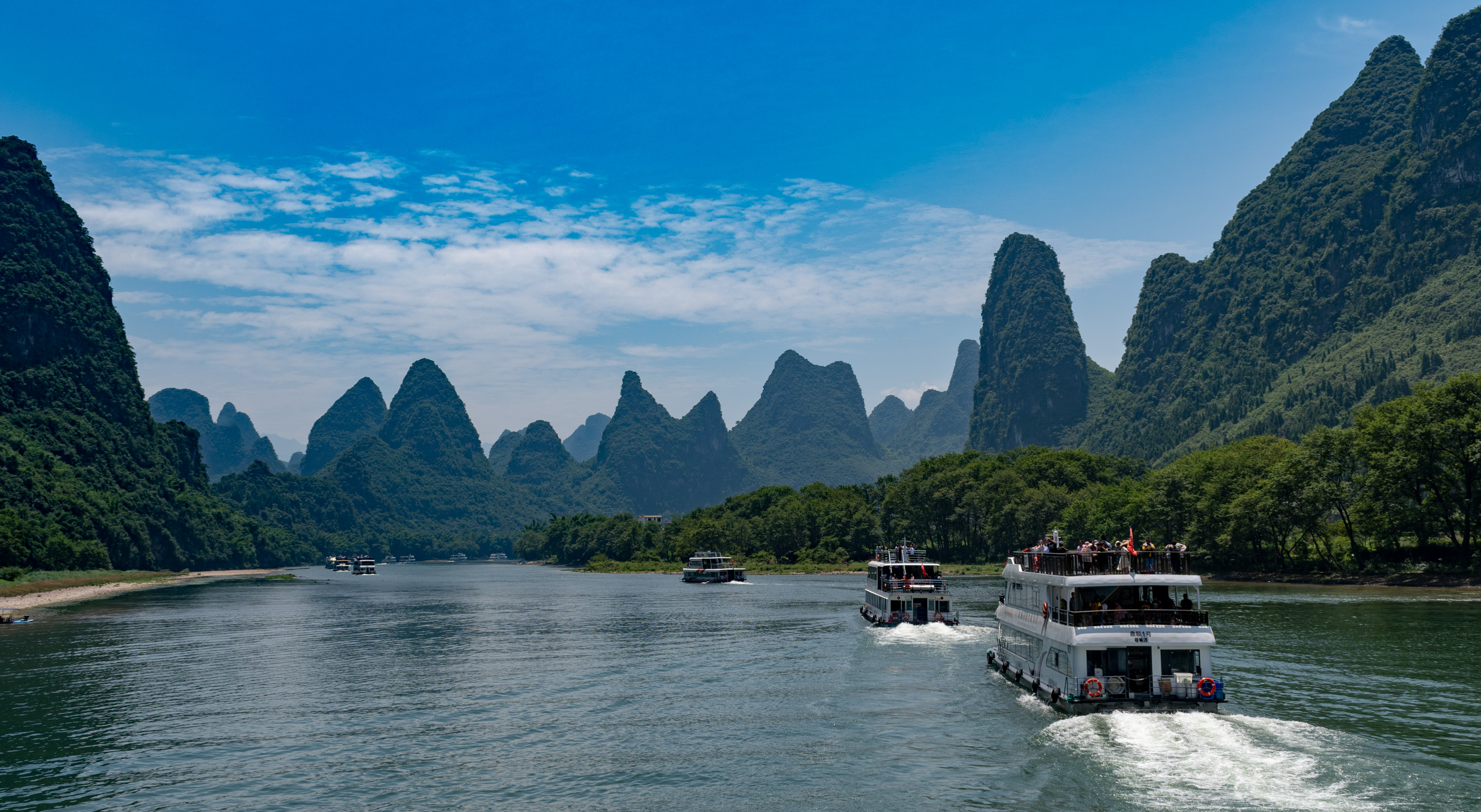
Li Jiang fengcong (cone karst) in Guilin as part of the South China Karst

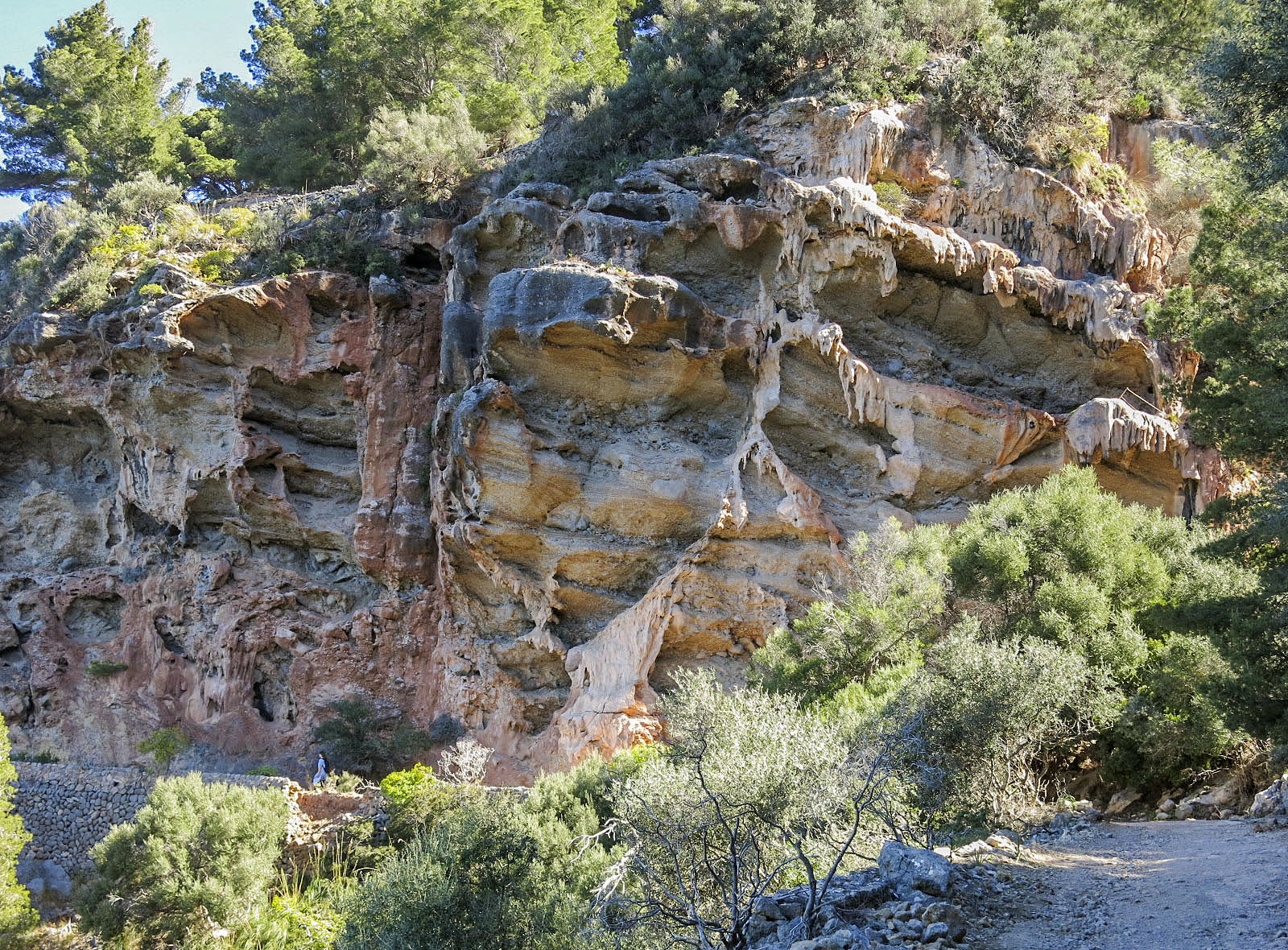
Karst formation of the Serra de Tramuntana

Karst (/kɑːrst/) is a topography formed from the dissolution of soluble carbonate rocks such as limestone and dolomite. It is characterized by features like poljes above and drainage systems with sinkholes and caves underground. There is some evidence that karst may occur in more weathering-resistant rocks such as quartzite given the right conditions.

Subterranean drainage may limit surface water, with few if any rivers or lakes. In regions where the dissolved bedrock is covered (perhaps by debris) or confined by one or more superimposed non-soluble rock strata, distinctive karst features may occur only at subsurface levels and can be totally missing above ground.

The study of paleokarst (buried karst in the stratigraphic column) is important in petroleum geology because as much as 50% of the world's hydrocarbon reserves are hosted in carbonate rock, and much of this is found in porous karst systems.

== Etymology ==
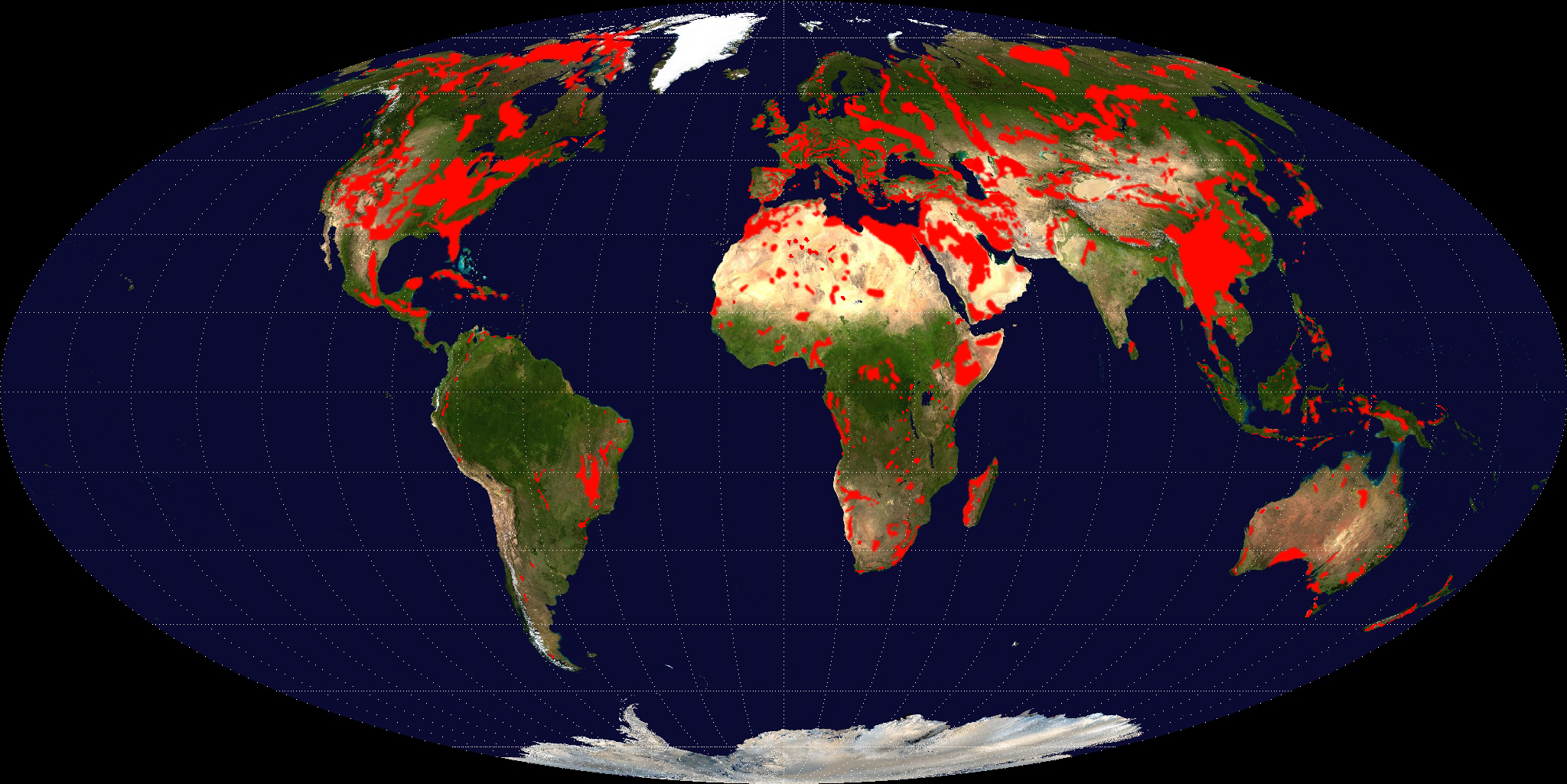
Global distribution of major outcrops of carbonate rocks (mainly limestone, except evaporites)

The English word karst was borrowed from German Karst in the late 19th century, which entered German usage much earlier, to describe a number of geological, geomorphological, and hydrological features found within the range of the Dinaric Alps, stretching from the northeastern corner of Italy above the city of Trieste, across southwestern Slovenia, the Balkan Peninsula along the coast of the eastern Adriatic to Kosovo and North Macedonia, where the massif of the Šar Mountains begins. The karst zone is at the northwesternmost section, described in early topographical research as a plateau between Italy and Slovenia.

In the local South Slavic languages, all variations of the word are derived from a Romanized Illyrian base (yielding Latin: carsus, Dalmatian: carsus), later metathesized in Slavic from the reconstructed form *korsъ into forms such as Slovene: kras and Serbo-Croatian: krš, kras, first attested in the 18th century, and the adjective form kraški in the 16th century. As a proper noun, the Slovene form Grast was first attested in 1177. Modern languages preserving the non-metathesized form (with -ar-) include Italian: Carso, German: Karst, and Albanian: karsti.

Ultimately, the word is of Mediterranean origin. It has also been suggested that the word may derive from the Proto-Indo-European root *karra- 'rock'. The name may also be connected to the oronym Kar(u)sádios oros cited by Ptolemy, and perhaps also to Latin Carusardius.

== Early studies ==
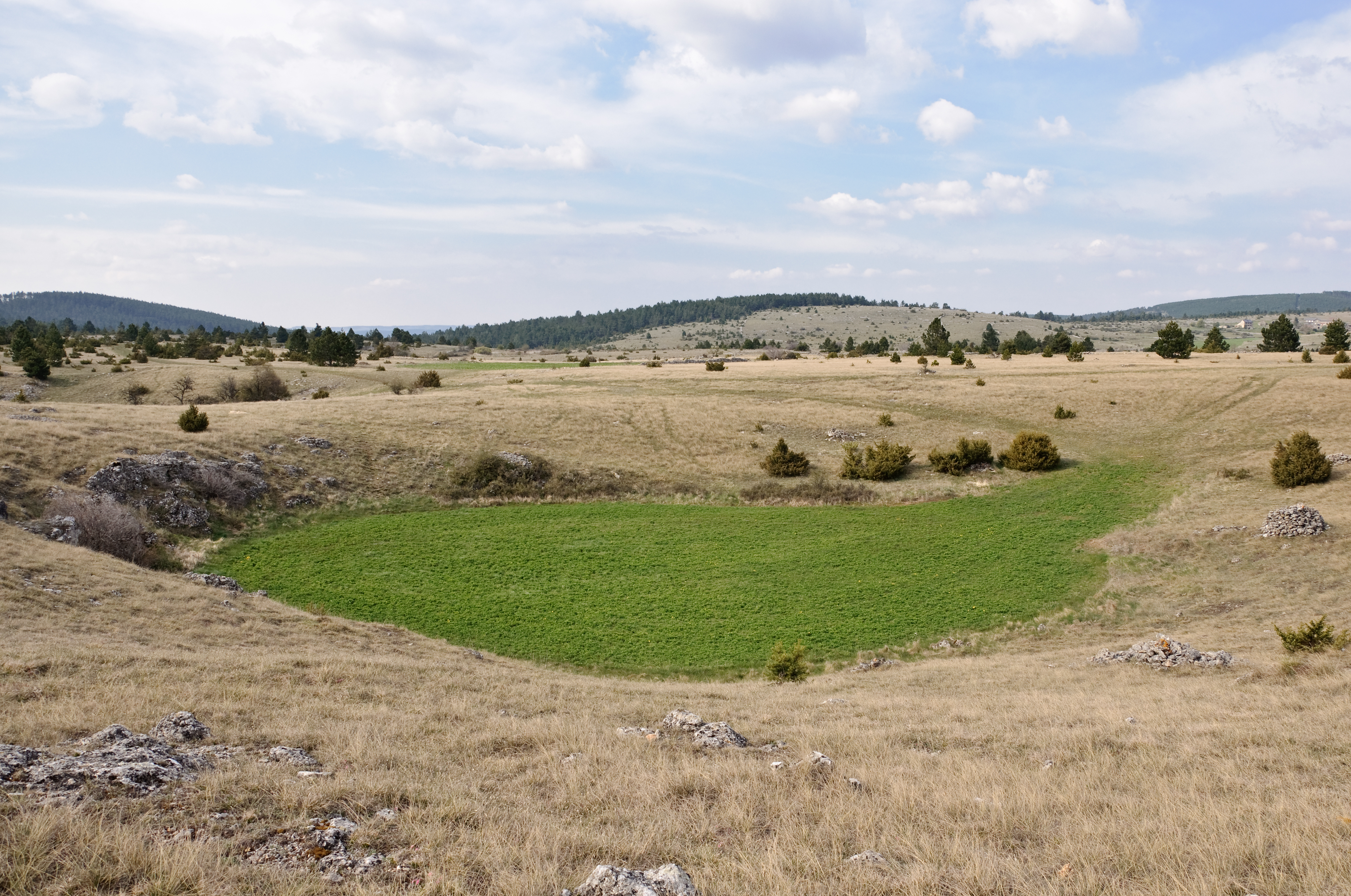
Doline in the causse de Sauveterre, Lozère, France

Johann Weikhard von Valvasor, a pioneer of the study of karst in Slovenia and a fellow of the Royal Society, London, introduced the word karst to European scholars in 1689 to describe the phenomenon of underground flows of rivers in his account of Lake Cerknica.

Jovan Cvijić greatly advanced the knowledge of karst regions to the point where he became known as the "father of karst geomorphology". Primarily discussing the karst regions of the Balkans, Cvijić's 1893 publication Das Karstphänomen describes landforms such as karren, dolines and poljes. In a 1918 publication, Cvijić proposed a cyclical model for karst landscape development.

Karst hydrology emerged as a discipline in the late 1950s and the early 1960s in France. Previously, the activities of cave explorers, called speleologists, had been dismissed as more of a sport than a science and so the underground karst caves and their associated watercourses were, from a scientific perspective, understudied.

== Development ==
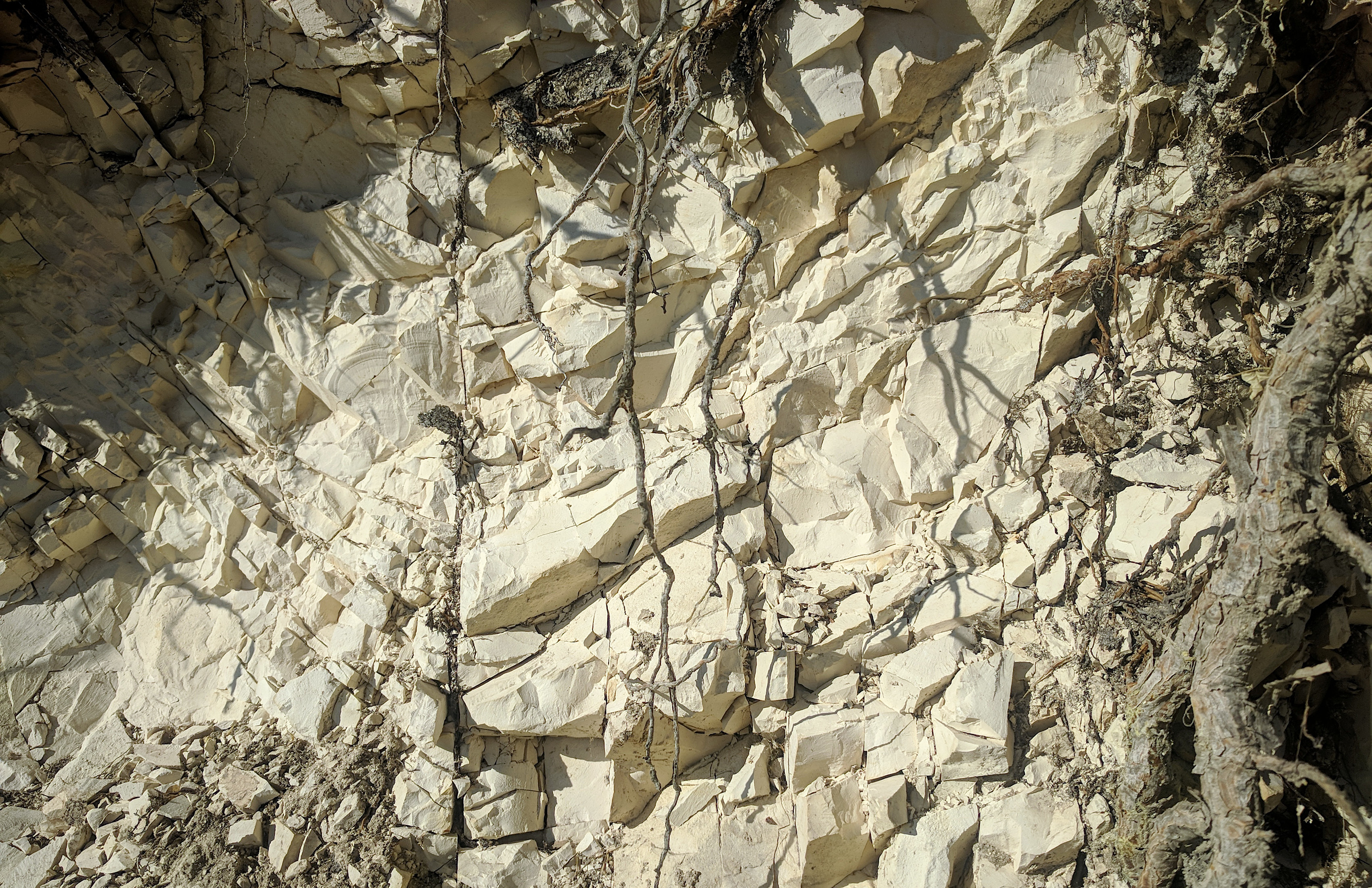
A limestone deposit in the Dinaric Alps near Sinj, Croatia

Karst is most strongly developed in dense carbonate rock, such as limestone, that is thinly bedded and highly fractured. Karst is not typically well developed in chalk, because chalk is highly porous rather than dense, so the flow of groundwater is not concentrated along fractures. Karst is also most strongly developed where the water table is relatively low, such as in uplands with entrenched valleys, and where rainfall is moderate to heavy. This contributes to rapid downward movement of groundwater, which promotes dissolution of the bedrock, whereas standing groundwater becomes saturated with carbonate minerals and ceases to dissolve the bedrock.

=== Chemistry of dissolution ===
The carbonic acid that causes karst features is formed as rain passes through Earth's atmosphere picking up carbon dioxide (CO_{2}), which readily dissolves in the water. Once the rain reaches the ground, it may pass through soil that provides additional CO_{2} produced by soil respiration. Some of the dissolved carbon dioxide reacts with the water to form a weak carbonic acid solution, which dissolves calcium carbonate. The primary reaction sequence in limestone dissolution is the following:

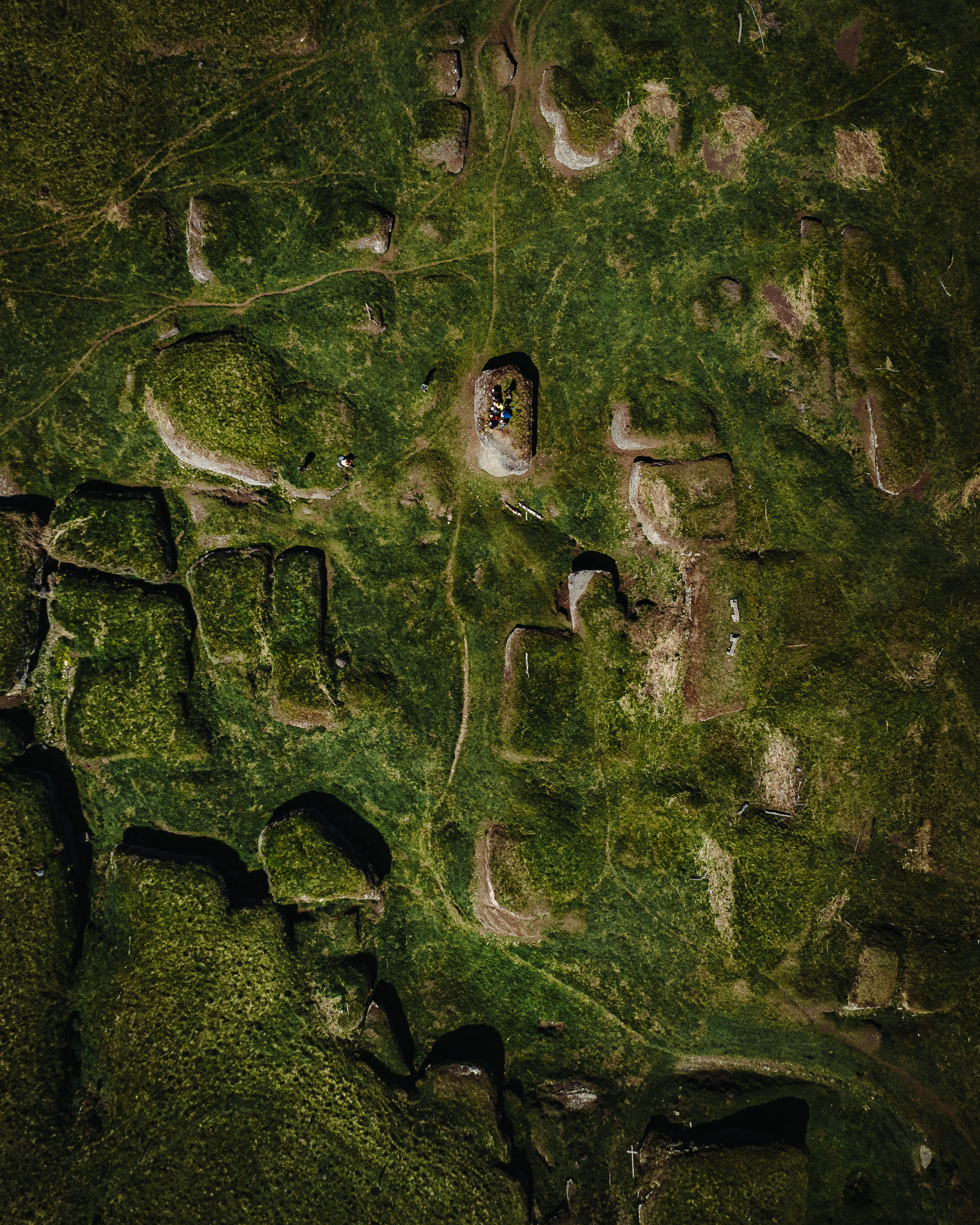
Kostivere karst area in Estonia

H_{2}O + CO_{2} → H_{2}CO_{3}
CaCO_{3} + H_{2}CO_{3} → Ca^{2+} + 2 HCO^{−}_{3}

In very rare conditions, oxidation can play a role. Oxidation played a major role in the formation of ancient Lechuguilla Cave in the US state of New Mexico and is presently active in the Frasassi Caves of Italy.

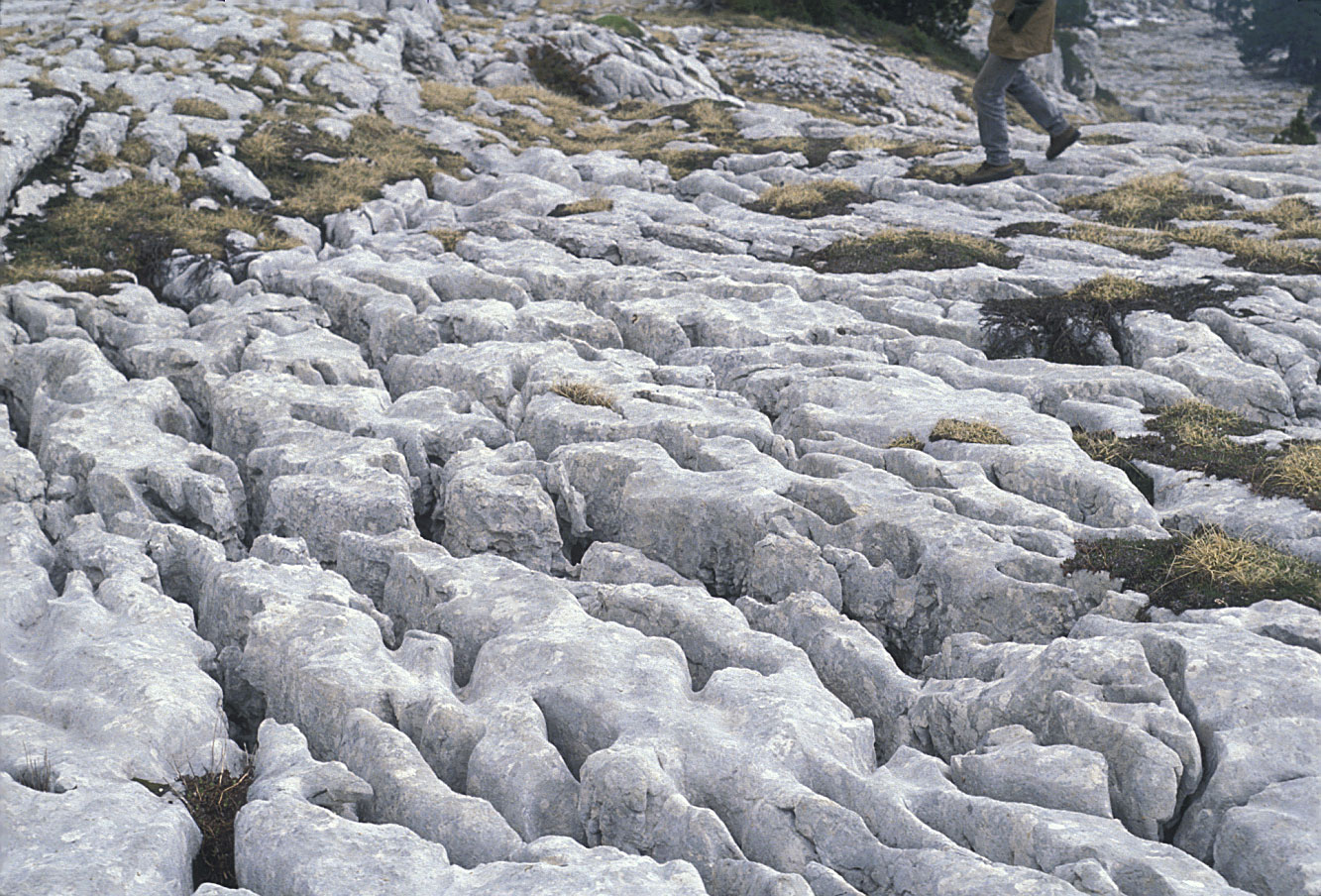
Limestone pavement on Dent de Crolles, France

The oxidation of sulfides leading to the formation of sulfuric acid can also be one of the corrosion factors in karst formation. As oxygen-rich surface waters seep into deep anoxic karst systems, they bring oxygen, which reacts with sulfide present in the system (pyrite or hydrogen sulfide) to form sulfuric acid (H_{2}SO_{4}). Sulfuric acid then reacts with calcium carbonate, causing increased erosion within the limestone formation. This chain of reactions is:

H_{2}S + 2 O_{2} → H_{2}SO_{4} (sulfide oxidation)
H_{2}SO_{4} + 2 H_{2}O → SO^{2−}_{4} + 2 H_{3}O^{+} (sulfuric acid dissociation)
CaCO_{3} + 2 H_{3}O^{+} → Ca^{2+} + H_{2}CO_{3} + 2 H_{2}O (calcium carbonate dissolution)
Ca^{2+} + SO^{2−}_{4} → CaSO_{4} (formation of calcium sulfate)
CaSO_{4} + 2 H_{2}O → [CaSO_{4}·2H_{2}O] (formation of gypsum)

This reaction chain forms gypsum.

== Morphology ==
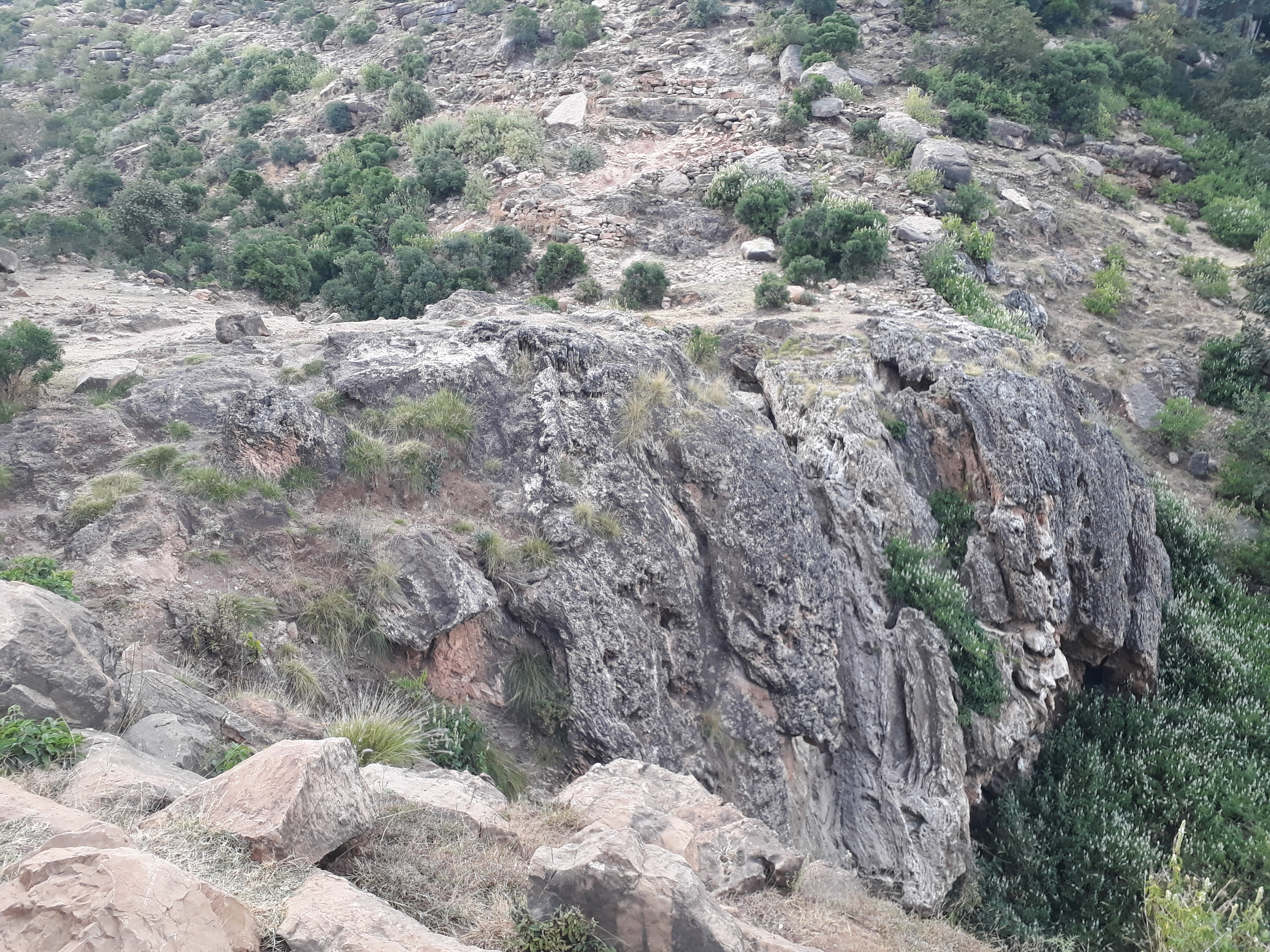
Rubaksa tufa plug in Ethiopia

The karstification of a landscape may result in a variety of large- or small-scale features both on the surface and beneath. On exposed surfaces, small features may include solution flutes (or rillenkarren), runnels, limestone pavement (clints and grikes), kamenitzas collectively called karren or lapiez. Medium-sized surface features may include sinkholes or cenotes (closed basins), vertical shafts, foibe (inverted funnel shaped sinkholes), disappearing streams, and reappearing springs.

Large-scale features may include limestone pavements, poljes, and karst valleys. Mature karst landscapes, where more bedrock has been removed than remains, may result in karst towers, or haystack/eggbox landscapes. Beneath the surface, complex underground drainage systems (such as karst aquifers) and extensive caves and cavern systems may form.

Erosion along limestone shores, notably in the tropics, produces karst topography that includes a sharp makatea surface above the normal reach of the sea, and undercuts that are mostly the result of biological activity or bioerosion at or a little above mean sea level. Some of the most dramatic of these formations can be seen in Thailand's Phangnga Bay and at Halong Bay in Vietnam.

Calcium carbonate dissolved into water may precipitate out where the water discharges some of its dissolved carbon dioxide. Rivers which emerge from springs may produce tufa terraces, consisting of layers of calcite deposited over extended periods of time. In caves, a variety of features collectively called speleothems are formed by deposition of calcium carbonate and other dissolved minerals.

=== Interstratal karst ===
Interstratal karst is a karst landscape which is developed beneath a cover of insoluble rocks. Typically this will involve a cover of sandstone overlying limestone strata undergoing solution. In the United Kingdom for example extensive doline fields have developed at Cefn yr Ystrad, Mynydd Llangatwg and Mynydd Llangynidr in South Wales across a cover of Twrch Sandstone which overlies concealed Carboniferous Limestone, the last-named locality having been declared a site of special scientific interest in respect of it.

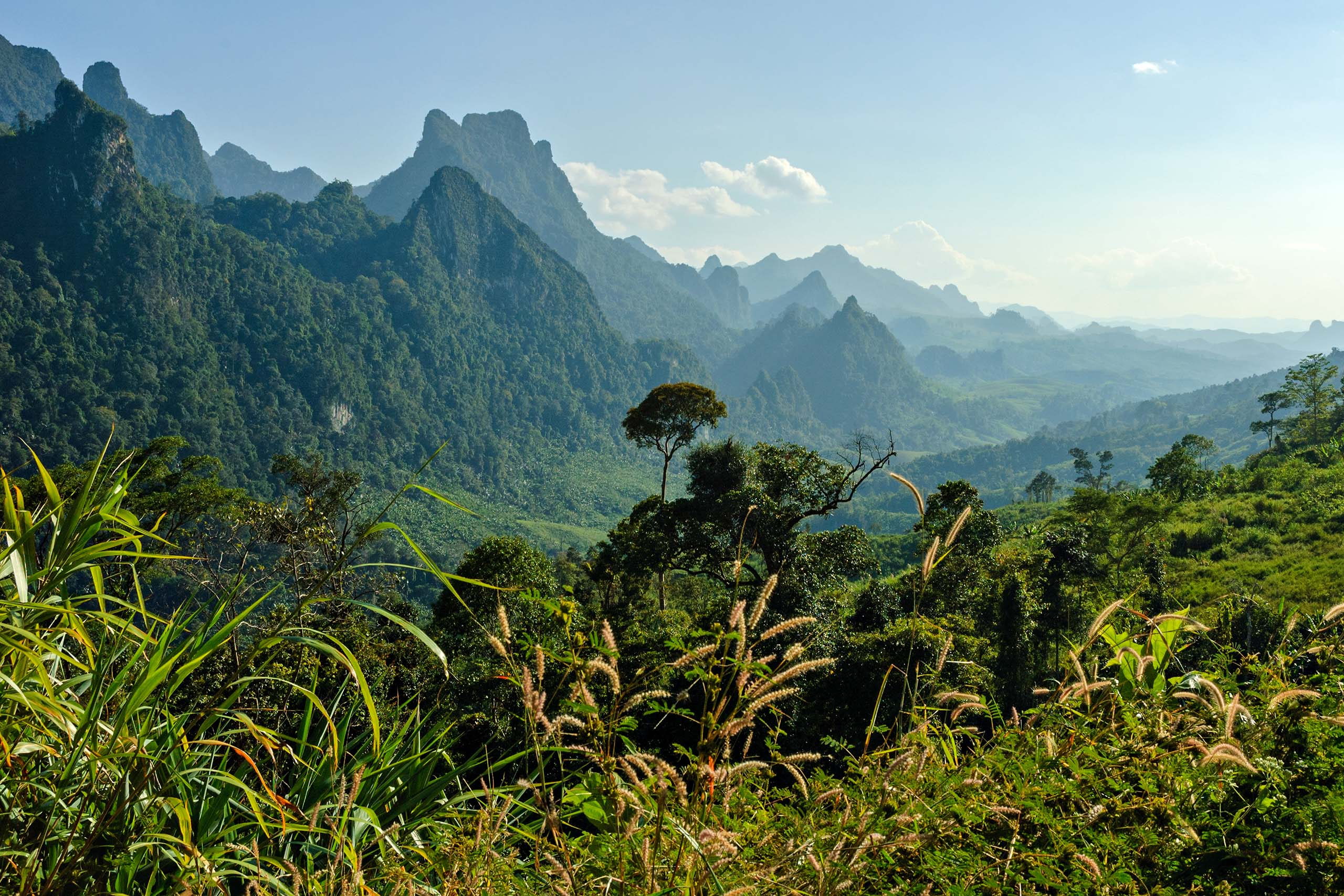
Karst landscape with irregularly shaped hills, near Kasi, Laos

=== Kegelkarst, salt karst, and karst forests ===
Kegelkarst is a type of tropical karst terrain with numerous cone-like hills, formed by cockpits, mogotes, and poljes and without strong fluvial erosion processes. This terrain is found in Cuba, Jamaica, Indonesia, Malaysia, the Philippines, Puerto Rico, southern China, Myanmar, Thailand, Laos and Vietnam.

Salt karst (or 'halite karst') is developed in areas where salt is undergoing solution underground. It can lead to surface depressions and collapses which present a geo-hazard.

Karst areas tend to have unique types of forests. The karst terrain is difficult for humans to traverse, so that their ecosystems are often relatively undisturbed. The soil tends to have a high pH, which encourages growth of unusual species of orchids, palms, mangroves, and other plants.

=== Paleokarst ===
Paleokarst or palaeokarst is a development of karst observed in geological history and preserved within the rock sequence, effectively a fossil karst. There are for example palaeokarst surfaces exposed within the Clydach Valley Subgroup of the Carboniferous Limestone sequence of South Wales which developed as sub-aerial weathering of recently formed limestones took place during periods of non-deposition within the early part of the period. Sedimentation resumed and further limestone strata were deposited on an irregular karst surface, the cycle recurring several times in connection with fluctuating sea levels over prolonged periods.

=== Pseudokarst ===
Pseudokarsts are similar in form or appearance to karst features but are created by different mechanisms. Examples include lava caves and granite tors—for example, Labertouche Cave in Victoria, Australia—and paleocollapse features. Mud Caves are an example of pseudokarst.

== Hydrology ==
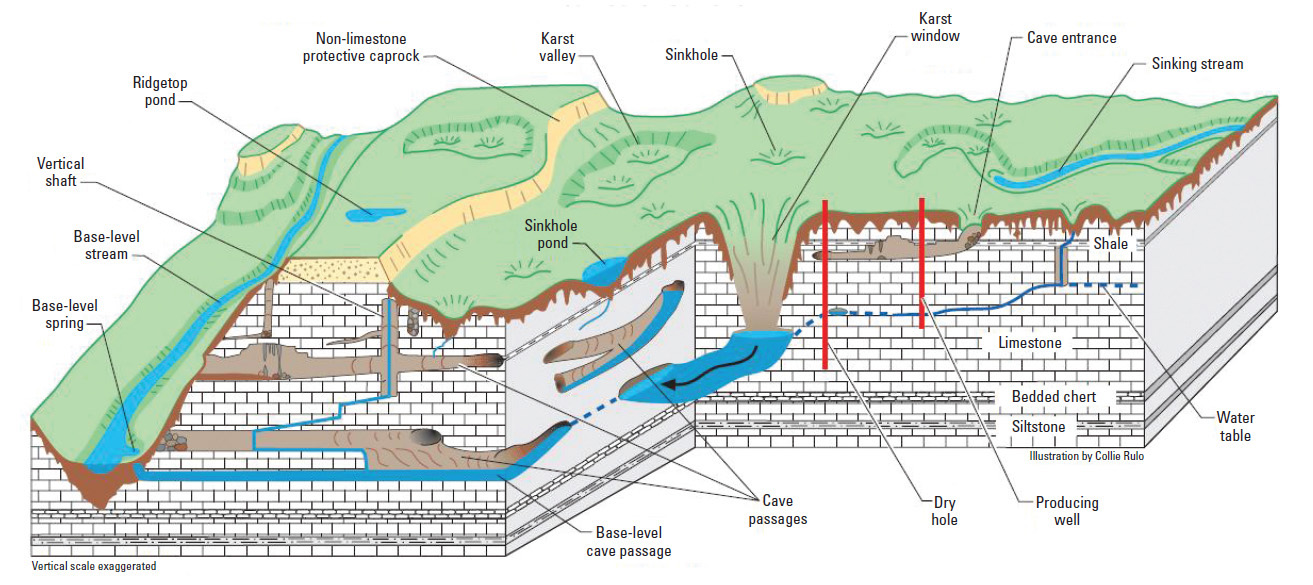
Features typical of well-developed karst terrain

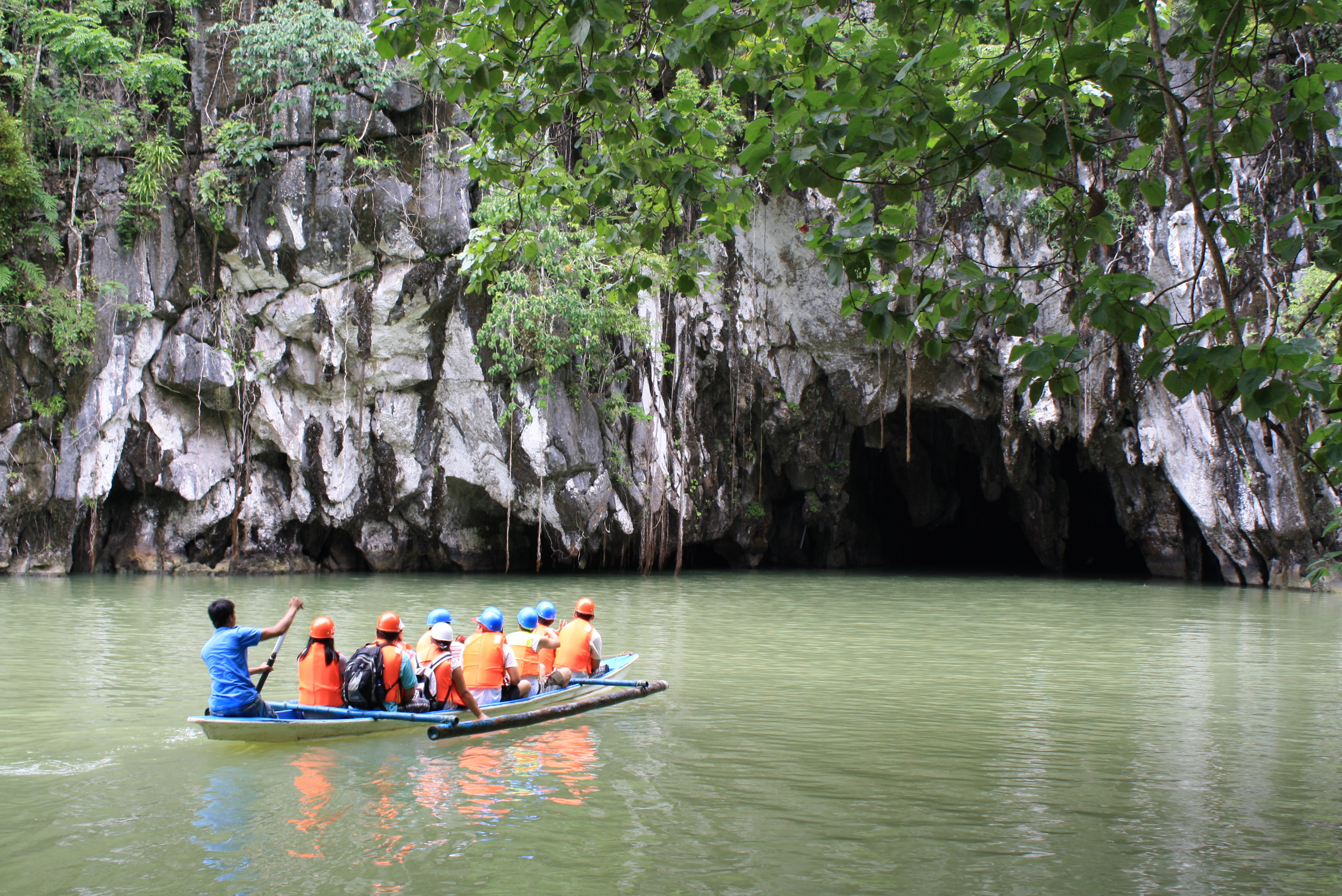
The Puerto Princesa Underground River, Philippines

Karst formations have unique hydrology, resulting in many unusual features. A karst fenster (karst window) occurs when an underground stream emerges onto the surface between layers of rock, cascades some distance, and then disappears back down, often into a sinkhole.

Rivers in karst areas may disappear underground a number of times and spring up again in different places, even under a different name, like Ljubljanica, the "river of seven names".

Another example of this is the Popo Agie River in Fremont County, Wyoming, where, at a site named "The Sinks" in Sinks Canyon State Park, the river flows into a cave in a formation known as the Madison Limestone and then rises again 800 m (1/2 mi) down the canyon in a placid pool.

A turlough is a unique type of seasonal lake found in Irish karst areas which are formed through the annual welling-up of water from the underground water system.

=== Aquifers ===
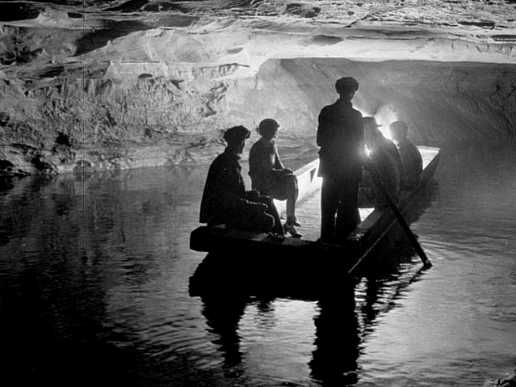
Water in karst aquifers flows through open conduits where water flows as underground streams.

Karst aquifers typically develop in limestone. Surface water containing natural carbonic acid moves down into small fissures in limestone. This carbonic acid gradually dissolves limestone thereby enlarging the fissures. The enlarged fissures allow a larger quantity of water to enter which leads to a progressive enlargement of openings. Abundant small openings store a large quantity of water. The larger openings form a conduit system that drains the aquifer to springs.

Characterization of karst aquifers requires field exploration to locate sinkholes, swallets, sinking streams, and springs in addition to studying geological maps. Conventional hydrogeologic methods such as aquifer tests and potentiometric mapping are insufficient to characterize the complexity of karst aquifers, and need to be supplemented with dye traces, measurement of spring discharges, and analysis of water chemistry. U.S. Geological Survey dye tracing has determined that conventional groundwater models that assume a uniform distribution of porosity are not applicable for karst aquifers.

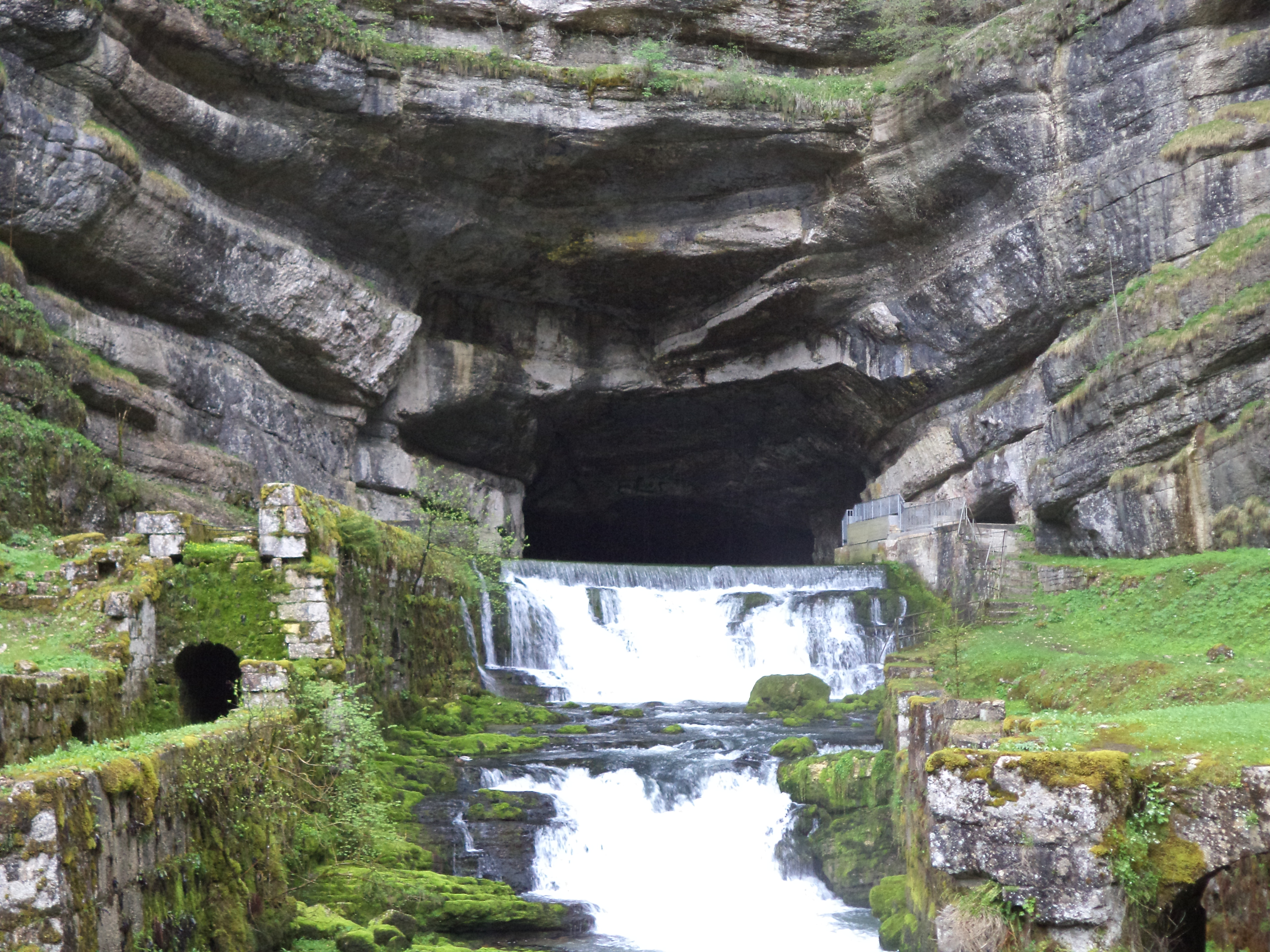
A karst spring in the Jura Mountains near Ouhans in eastern France at the source of the river Loue

Linear alignment of surface features such as straight stream segments and sinkholes develop along fracture traces. Locating a well in a fracture trace or intersection of fracture traces increases the likelihood to encounter good water production. Voids in karst aquifers can be large enough to cause destructive collapse or subsidence of the ground surface that can initiate a catastrophic release of contaminants.

Groundwater flow rate in karst aquifers is much more rapid than in porous aquifers. For example, in the Barton Springs, within the Edwards Aquifer, dye traces measured the karst groundwater flow rates from 0.5 to 7 miles per day (0.8 to 11.3 km/d). The rapid groundwater flow rates make karst aquifers much more sensitive to groundwater contamination than porous aquifers.

Groundwater in karst areas is also just as easily polluted as surface streams, because Karst formations are cavernous and highly permeable, resulting in reduced opportunity for contaminant filtration.

Well water may also be unsafe as the water may have run unimpeded from a sinkhole in a cattle pasture, bypassing the normal filtering that occurs in a porous aquifer. Sinkholes have often been used as farmstead or community trash dumps. Overloaded or malfunctioning septic tanks in karst landscapes may dump raw sewage directly into underground channels.

Geologists are concerned with these negative effects of human activity on karst hydrology which, as of 2007, supplied about 25% of the global demand for drinkable water.

=== Effects of karst hydrology ===
Farming in karst areas must take into account the lack of surface water. The soils may be fertile enough, and rainfall may be adequate, but rainwater quickly moves through the crevices into the ground, sometimes leaving the surface soil parched between rains.

The karst topography also poses peculiar difficulties for human inhabitants. Sinkholes can develop gradually as surface openings enlarge, but progressive erosion is frequently unseen until the roof of a cavern suddenly collapses. Such events have swallowed homes, cattle, cars, and farm machinery. In the United States, sudden collapse of such a cavern-sinkhole swallowed part of the collection of the National Corvette Museum in Bowling Green, Kentucky in 2014.

== Karst areas ==
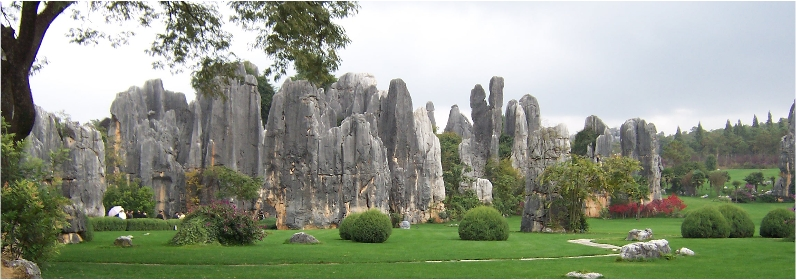
Lunan Stone Forest, Yunnan, China

Drone video of Kostivere karst area in Estonia (2021)

The world's largest limestone karst is Australia's Nullarbor Plain. Slovenia has the world's highest risk of sinkholes, while the western Highland Rim in the eastern United States is at the second-highest risk of karst sinkholes.

In Canada, Wood Buffalo National Park, Northwest Territories contains areas of karst sinkholes. Mexico hosts important karst regions in the Yucatán Peninsula and Chiapas. The West of Ireland is home to The Burren, a karst limestone area. The South China Karst in the provinces of Guizhou, Guangxi, and Yunnan provinces is a UNESCO World Heritage Site.

== List of terms for karst-related features ==
Many karst-related terms derive from South Slavic languages, entering scientific vocabulary through early research in the Western Balkan Dinaric Alpine karst.

- Abîme, a vertical shaft in karst that may be very deep and usually opens into a network of subterranean passages
- Cenote, a deep sinkhole, characteristic of Mexico, resulting from collapse of limestone bedrock that exposes groundwater underneath
- Doline, also sink or sinkhole, is a closed depression draining underground in karst areas. The word doline comes from the South Slavic word dolina 'valley'.
- Foibe, an inverted funnel-shaped sinkhole
- Karst window (also known as a "karst fenster"), a feature where a spring emerges briefly, with the water discharge then abruptly disappearing into a nearby sinkhole
- Karst spring, a spring emerging from karst, originating a flow of water on the surface
- Limestone pavement, a landform consisting of a flat, incised surface of exposed limestone that resembles an artificial pavement
- Losing stream, sinking river or ponornica in South Slavic languages.
- Polje (karst polje, karst field), a large flat specifically karst plain. The word polje derives from South Slavic languages.
- Ponor, same as estavelle, sink or sinkhole in South Slavic languages, where surface flow enters an underground system
- Scowle, porous irregular karst landscape in a region of England.
- Turlough (turlach), a type of disappearing lake characteristic of Irish karst.
- Uvala, a collection of multiple smaller individual sinkholes that coalesce into a compound sinkhole. The term derives from South Slavic languages.

== Karst studies ==
The study of the various aspects of karst regions is called karst studies, karst science, or karstology. This includes biological, chemical, ecological, geomorphological, hydrogeological, hydrological, political, socio-economical, and other processes over a variety of spatial and temporal scales in karst regions, with the purpose of understanding karst aquifers and ecosystems, and the development of the surface and underground structure, so that the environment can be protected and human activities planned effectively. Prominent karst researchers include Jovan Cvijić and William Morris Davis.

== See also ==
- Alvar – Limestone-based biological environment
- Gryke – Natural karst landform consisting of a flat, incised surface of exposed limestone
- Glaciokarst – Karst landscape that was glaciated during the cold periods of the Pleistocene
- Glossary of landforms
- Speleology – Science of cave and karst systems
- Subterranean river – River that runs wholly or partly beneath the ground surface
- Thermokarst – Irregular land surface of marshy hollows and small hummocks formed when permafrost thaws
