= Van Krevelen diagram =

Graphical plots used to assess the origin and maturity of kerogen and hydrocarbons

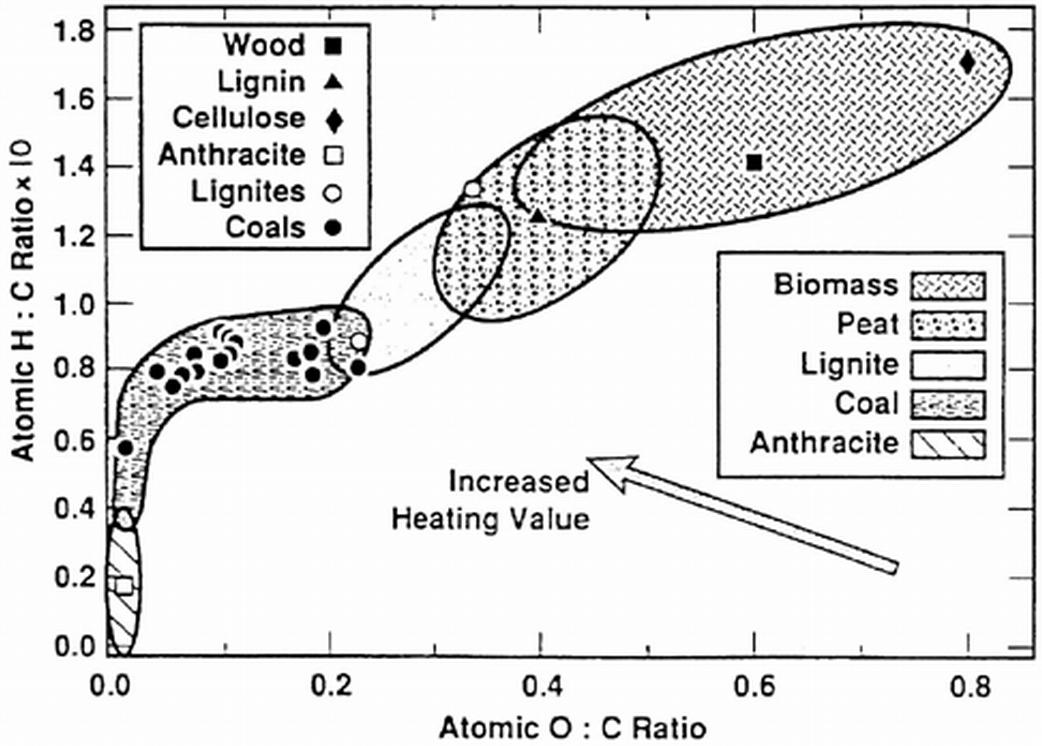
Van Krevelen diagram for various solid fuels

Van Krevelen diagrams are graphical plots developed by Dirk Willem van Krevelen (chemist and professor of fuel technology at the TU Delft) and used to assess the origin and maturity of kerogen and petroleum. The diagram cross-plots the hydrogen:carbon atomic ratio as a function of the oxygen:carbon atomic ratio.

Beginning around 2003, the diagrams are often used to visualize data from mass spectrometry analysis, used for mixtures other than kerogen and petroleum. For example, the diagrams have been used in one analysis of the components in Scotch whiskey, and are used in characterizing Dissolved organic carbon (DOC) in waters and soils

== Types of kerogen ==
Different types of kerogen have differing potentials to produce oil during maturation. These various types of kerogen can be distinguished on a van Krevelen diagram.

== See also ==
- Petroleum geology
- Maturity (geology)
