= Organic-rich sedimentary rocks =

Organic-rich sedimentary rocks are a specific type of sedimentary rock that contains significant amounts (>3%) of organic carbon. The most common types include coal, lignite, oil shale, or black shale. The organic material may be disseminated throughout the rock giving it a uniform dark color, and/or it may be present as discrete occurrences of tar, bitumen, asphalt, petroleum, coal or carbonaceous material. Organic-rich sedimentary rocks may act as source rocks which generate hydrocarbons that accumulate in other sedimentary "reservoir" rocks (see oil sands and petroleum geology). Potential source rocks are any type of sedimentary rock that can dispel available carbon from within it (limestone is a classic example of a source rock). Good reservoir rocks are any sedimentary rock that has high pore-space availability. This allows the hydrocarbons to accumulate within the rock and be stored for long periods of time (a sandstone commonly makes a good source rock). Highly permeable reservoir rocks are also of interest to industry professionals, as they allow for the easy extraction of the hydrocarbons within. The hydrocarbon reservoir system is not complete, however, without a "cap rock". Cap rocks are rock units which have very low porosity and permeability, which trap the hydrocarbons within the units below as they try to migrate upwards.

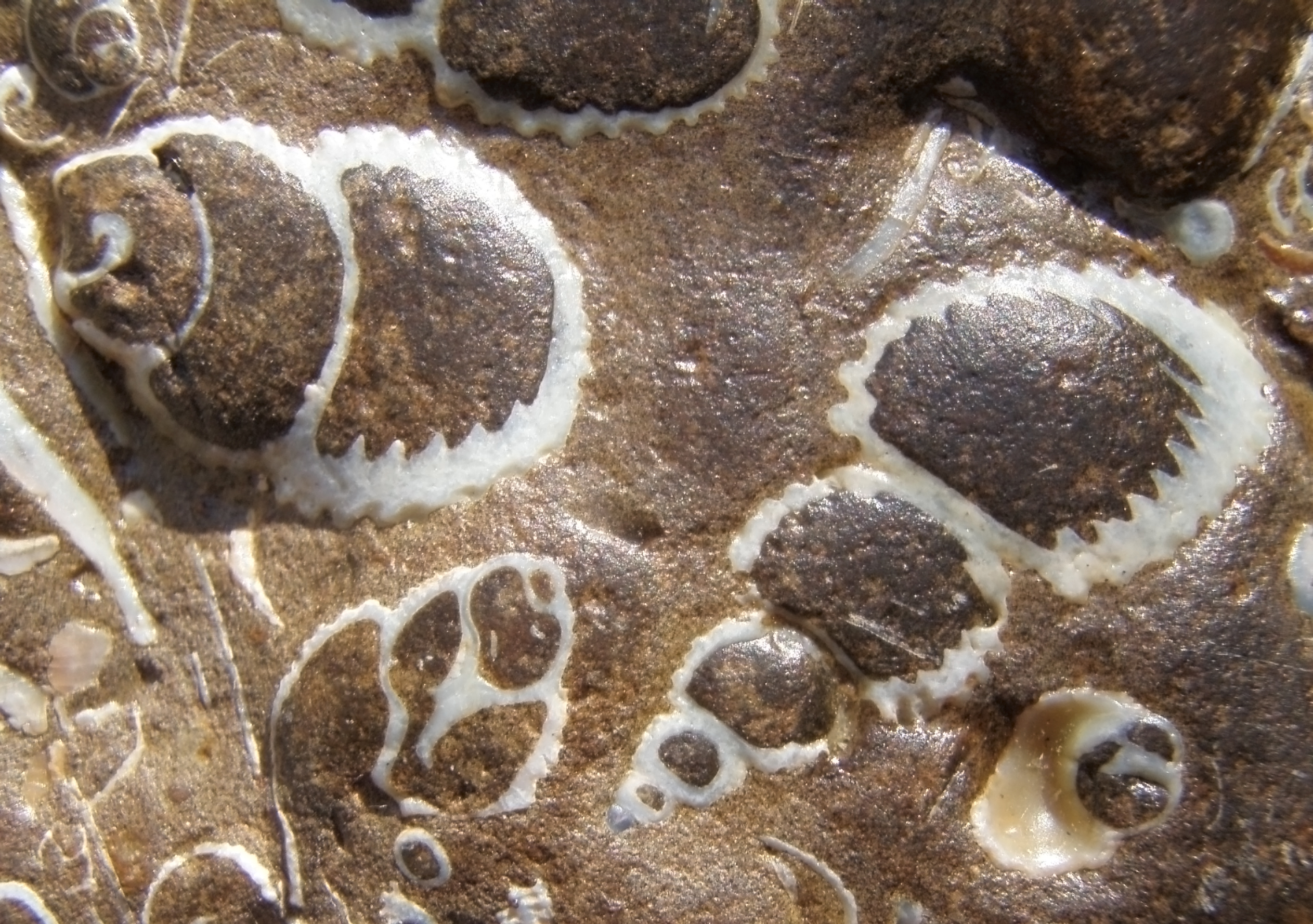
Sandstone with fossil shells

== Fossil organic carbon ==
Organic carbon is derived from ancient biological deposition of matter (kerogen is the name given to this by geologists), and this organic matter is buried with mineral and rock fragments into sedimentary rocks. The temperature and pressure of the burial conditions will affect the material's diagenetic processes, and determine whether or not the material will be transformed into petroleum. Fossiliferous organic carbon can alI BE sported throughout the modern environment, in rivers, soils, and eventually the oceans. This process occurs over a very large time scale, and acts as one of the major mechanisms for fossiliferous organic carbon to be released back into the environment.

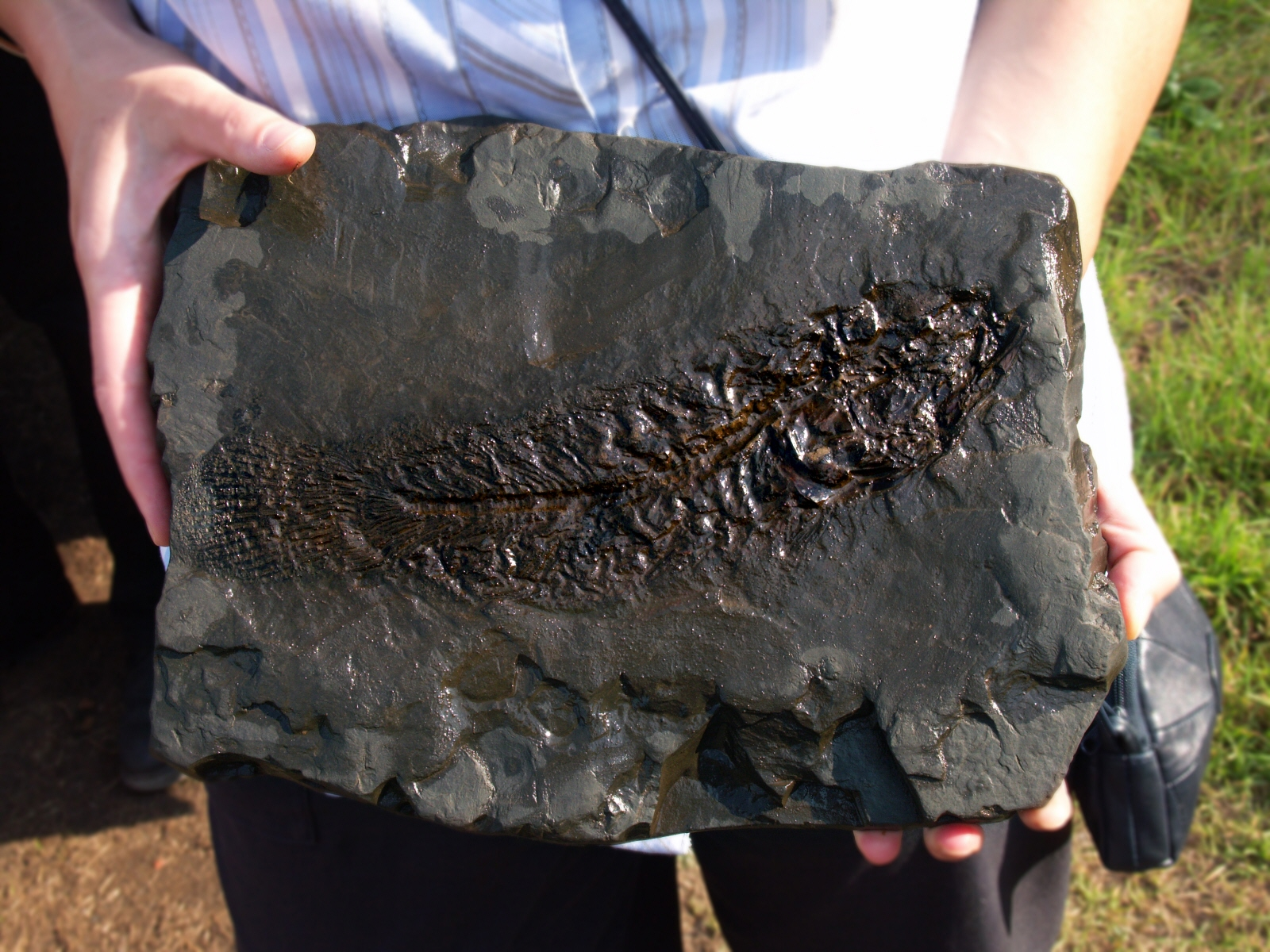
Organic remains preserved in sedimentary rock

== Organic sediment production ==
For decades, it was thought that the majority of the organic-rich sedimentary beds deposited on the ocean floor was a byproduct of three environmental variables: the input of organic material, the rate of sedimentation, and the amount of deep-water oxygenation. These variables are linked on spatial and temporal scales by climate, ocean currents, and sea-level at the time of deposition. Any changes in the variables or the parameters that link them will result in different sedimentary deposits, as seen on the surface today. Knowledge of this information is valued among commercial companies, as its application can deduce which sedimentary deposits could be economically productive to exploit. By using the inverse of the previous methodology, these deposits can be used as proxies to infer information such as paleoclimate, previous ocean circulation cycles, past sea-levels, as well as the proportion of variables with relation to one another that caused the production of the deposit. This information can be very valuable to geoscientists, as it can help them reconstruct past processes that ultimately shaped the Earth to form its present state.

However, based upon more recent research, these outcomes are no longer completely viable. For example: In case studies of the Black Sea, a modern anoxic environment, it has been shown that anoxia within the lower-levels of the water column alone do not produce significant amount of organic-rich sediments, even though sufficient organic material was supplied to the region in the Holocene. Therefore, the new theory is that "primary producers" higher in the water column are responsible for the majority of the deposition of carbon-rich sediment in continental margin environments. Based upon a study conducted involving ocean-circulation models in the Cretaceous, it was found that although conditions were relatively similar to those today, the oceans had much harsher currents that influenced the water column. The new thought is that these ocean currents were slowed by blooms of microscopic marine primary producers, which allowed for the settlement of organic-rich sediments at the seafloor, producing many of the economically productive black shale beds that are present today. To this day it remains an intensely researched subject by scholars and commercial companies alike.

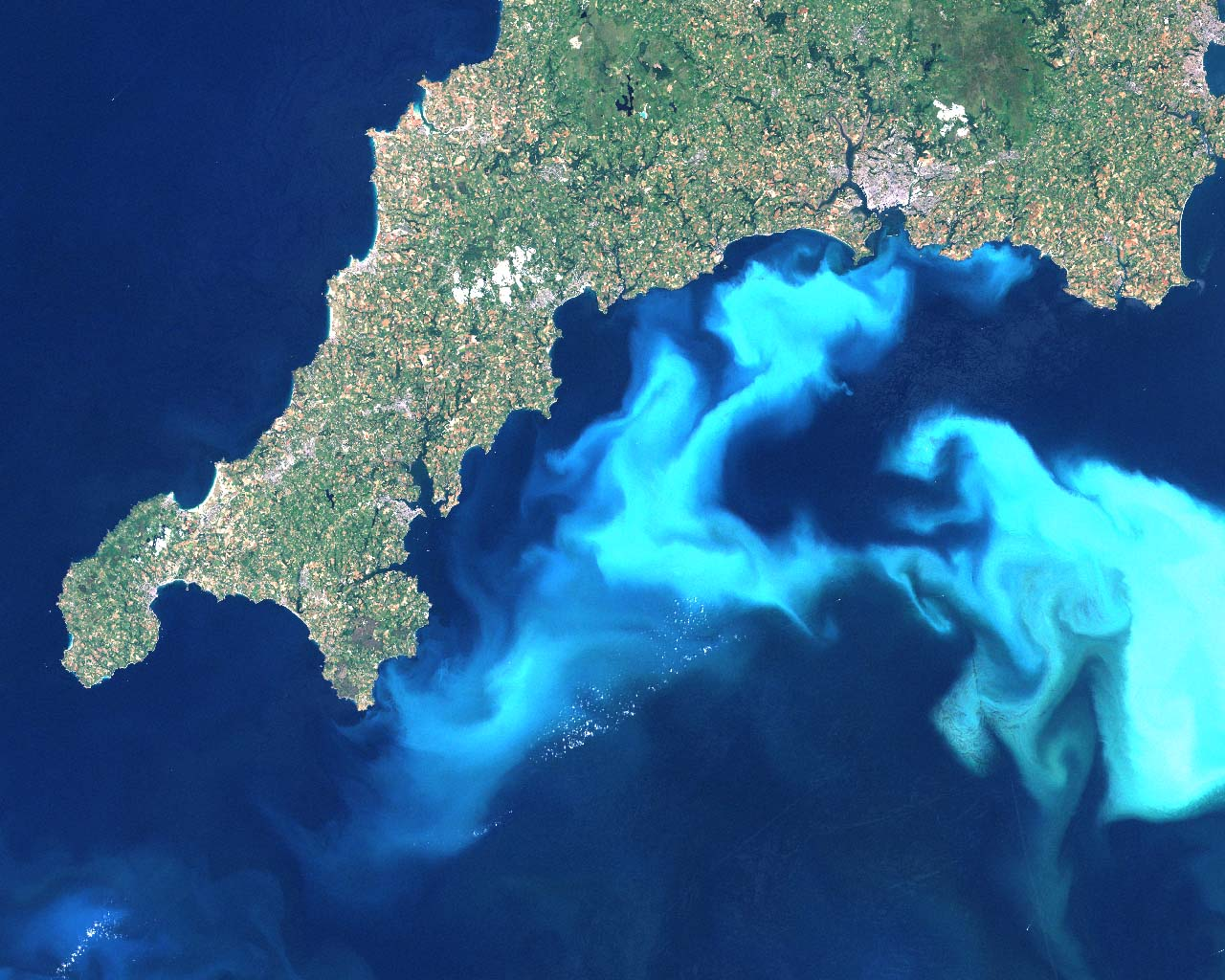
An example of an algal bloom just south of Cornwall, England.

== Role of bacteria in organic-rich sedimentary rocks ==
Bacteria are thought to be an important contributor to the creation of petroleum source rock. However, studies have shown that abundances of bacterial biomarkers do not always reflect relative contributions to sedimentary organic carbon. Bacteria in sedimentary rocks are now thought to only have minor contributions to the production of fossil fuels such as oil. As bacterial reworking of sedimentary debris is extremely important, its significance cannot be ignored. Certain bacteria can assist in the breaking down of organic material early in the sedimentary processes, although bacterial biomass itself may represent only a minor component of the total organic carbon in carbonaceous rocks. Many of the ideas of minimal bacterial contribution can be attributed to isotopic studies of the carbon in some sedimentary rocks. Studies of many and varied sedimentary sites are required to come to such conclusions; there are myriad bacterial species, and each organic source rock may have differing interactions with these bacteria. This is why not all bacterial influenced addition of carbon to sedimentary rocks can be excluded: each situation is unique, with varying bacteria, and varying settings. The combination of microscopic and molecular studies should be addressed when interpreting abundances of bacterial biomarkers present in a petroleum source and its influence on the total organic carbon.
