= Maturity (geology) =

In petroleum geology, the maturity of a rock is a measure of its state in terms of hydrocarbon generation. Maturity is established using a combination of geochemical and basin modelling techniques.

Rocks with high total organic carbon, (termed source rocks), will alter under increasing temperature such that the organic molecules slowly mature into hydrocarbons (see diagenesis). Source rocks are therefore broadly categorised as immature (no hydrocarbon generation), sub-mature (limited hydrocarbon generation), mature (extensive hydrocarbon generation) and overmature (most hydrocarbons have been generated).

The maturity of a source rock can also be used as an indicator of its hydrocarbon potential. That is, if a rock is sub-mature, then it has a much higher potential to generate further hydrocarbons than one that is overmature.

== See also ==
- Maturity (sedimentology)
- Van Krevelen diagram
- Vitrinite reflectance
