= Paleocollapse =

Rock structure

Paleocollapse is a rock structure resembling the karst landform, but is formed essentially by the dissolution of underlying sedimentary rock. It has also been called paleo-karst collapse. This has the effect of collapsing the formerly intact rock above, forming extensive fractures, debris pipes, and open caverns. Normally, the process was started and completed in the geologic past.

Illustration of the mechanism of paleocollapse

The mechanism of its formation is relatively simple. As in the illustration, a deeper layer of salt (or other evaporite) is dissolved, through some process. The support for the upper rock vanishes, and starts the collapse process. This is much like the subsidence associated with old coal mines. Eventually, the caving process reaches the surface, and can be associated with debris pipes, rock fractures, and open caverns. At some later date, undisturbed sediments, or glacial till may fill the collapse zone.

Paleocollapse geology can be remarkably stable (unlike karst), but poses some serious challenges to engineering or environmental geology. Primarily, the collapse zone is extremely permeable. This can provide a conduit for groundwater, or contaminant transport. As well, these zones may only be marginally stable, in that they can be reactivated by human activity, or events such as earthquakes. In China, underground mines have become suddenly flooded, due to paleocollapse features.

In order to fully characterize the hazard, investigations may be undertaken, using dye tracers, or exploration geophysics. Of particular importance is understanding the true stability of the region. The paleocollapse process may continue at some future date, due to deep groundwater flow changes. Or perhaps, the reason that a certain evaporite zone has dissolved, is because of underlying faults in the bedrock.
