= Elenctics =

Christian practical theology concerned with persuading people of the Gospel

Elenctics, in Christianity, is a division of practical theology concerned with persuading people of other faiths (or no faith) of the truth of the Gospel message, with an end to producing in them an awareness of, and sense of guilt for, their sins, a recognition of their need for God's forgiveness, repentance (i.e. the disposition to turn away from their sin) and faith in Jesus Christ as Savior and Lord.

Johan Herman Bavinck (1964:221) explains that:

The term "elenctic" is derived from the Greek verb elengchein. In Homer the verb has the meaning of "to bring to shame." it is connected with the word elengchos that signifies shame. In later Attic Greek the significance of the term underwent a certain change so that the emphasis fell more upon the conviction of guilt, the demonstration of guilt. It is this latter significance that it has in the New Testament. Its meaning is entirely ethical and religious.

Perhaps the most famous example of specifically elenctic literature in the history of Christianity is St. Thomas Aquinas' great work, Summa Contra Gentiles.

== See also ==
- Francis Turretin – a Swiss-Italian Reformed scholastic theologian who wrote Institutio Theologiae Elencticae.
- Note: Elenctics is not distinctly Christian and should be understood more broadly as a method of defending a statement indirectly by proposing objections to the statement and answering them through cross-examination (the meaning of the Greek word, elenchus). It is also called the Socratic method.
