= Johan Herman Bavinck =

Dutch pastor, missionary and theologian

Johan Herman Bavinck (22 November 1895 – 23 June 1964) was a Dutch pastor, missionary and theologian.

== Family ==
Bavinck was born in Rotterdam as the second son of Reverend Coenraad Bernardus Bavinck and Grietje Bouwes. He attended the Marnix Gymnasium there. Both his father and his grandfather Jan Bavinck were pastors. His uncle was Herman Bavinck, pastor and Professor of Dogmatics at the theological school in Kampen and at the Vrije Universiteit in Amsterdam.

In 1922 Bavinck married Tine Robers; she died in 1953. Their children were Koert, Ben and Ineke.

In 1956 he married again.

== Study and Ministry ==
After his secondary education he went to study theology at the Vrije Universiteit in Amsterdam. After this study he moved to Germany to continue his study in Gießen and Erlangen. In 1919 he graduated from Erlangen having completed a dissertation on psychology and mysticism in the work of Heinrich von Suso.

In 1920, he began his work as pastor of a church in the Gereformeerde Kerken in Nederland. He became pastor in Medan and the next year in the congregation in Bandoeng, both in Indonesia. Both churches were focused on the Dutch population. During a furlough he decided to stay in the Netherlands, and in 1927 he became pastor in Heemstede. In January 1930, he departed again to Indonesia, after many months of preparation, to be a missionary pastor. He settled in Surakarta and worked from 1934 to 1939 as a teacher on the Seminary for Javanese Ministers in Yogyakarta. In 1939, he became in a professor at the Vrije Universiteit in Amsterdam. At the same time he was from 1939 till 1954 Professor of Missions at the Kampen Theological Seminary. In 1955 he was appointed Professor of Practical Theology at Vrije Universiteit in Amsterdam.

Because of this assignment he had to end his work in Kampen. Among his contributions to the theology of missions, are his views on elenctics.

== Publications ==
- Der Einfluss des Gefulhs auf das Assoziationsleben bei Heinrich von Suso - Erlangen 1919
- Inleiding in de zielkunde - Kampen 1926
- Persoonlijkheid en Wereldbesschouwing - Kampen 1928; translated as Personality and Worldview - 2023
- Christus en de mystiek van het oosten - Kampen 1934
- De boodschap van Christus en de niet-christelijke religies. Een analyse en beoordeling van het boek van dr. Kraemer: The Christian message in a non-Christian world - Kampen 1940
- The impact of Christianity on the non-Christian world - Grand Rapids 1948
- Religieus besef en het christelijk geloof - Kampen 1949
- Inleiding in de zendingswetenschap - Kampen 1954; translated as An Introduction to the Science of Missions - 1960
- Orang-orang sekeliling Jesus, 1962
- The Church Between Temple and Mosque - A Study of the Relationship Between the Christian Faith and Other Religions - Grand Rapids 1966
- De mens van nu
