= Marnix Gymnasium =

Secondary school in Rotterdam, Netherlands

Marnix, het Rotterdamse Gymnasium
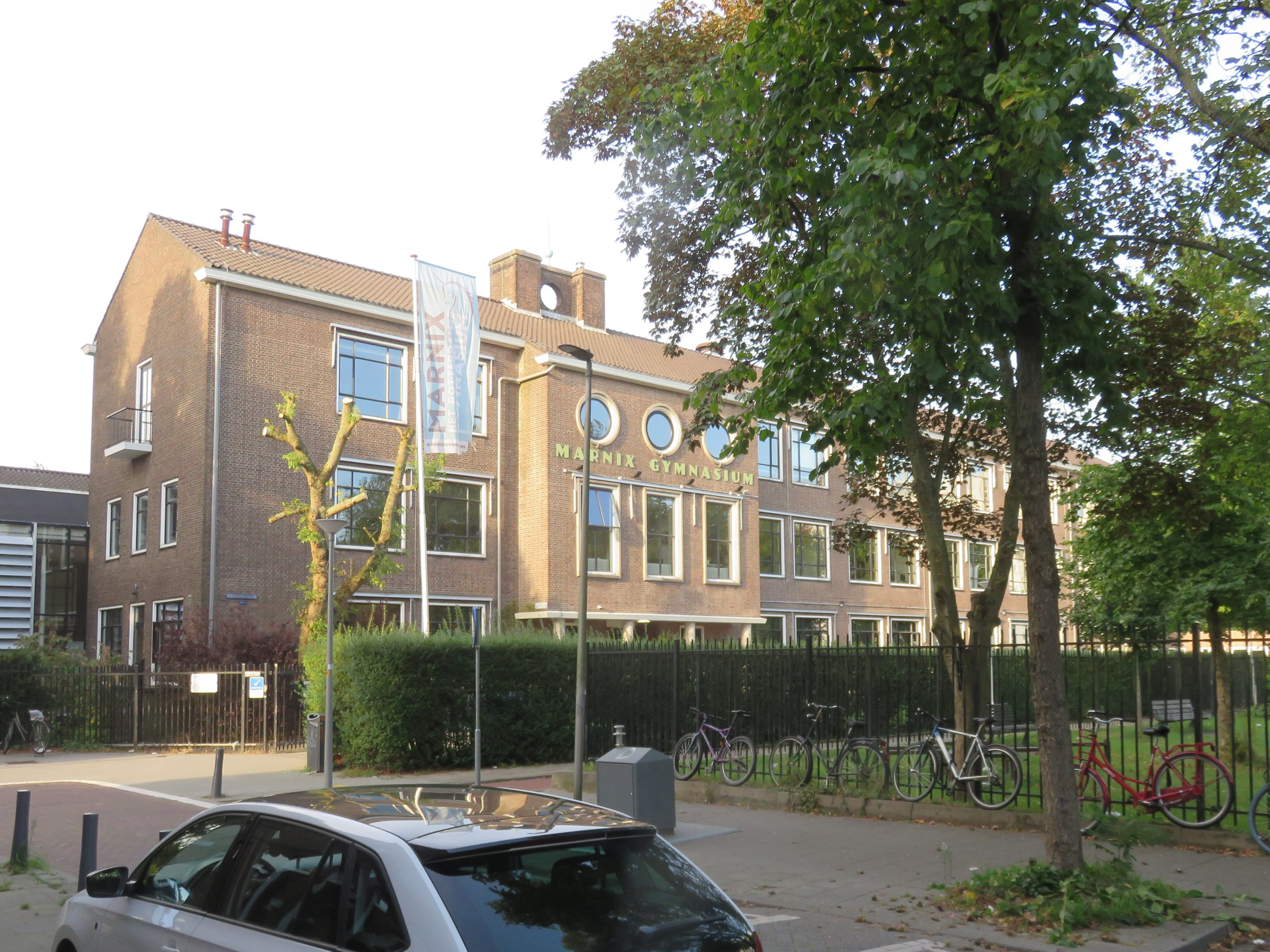
- Marnix Gymnasium in Rotterdam-West

Location
- Essenburgsingel 58; Rotterdam; Netherlands; 51.92257°N 4.454205°E

Information
- Type: Gymnasium
- Motto: Marnix, het Rotterdamse Gymnasium
- Established: 1903
- Principal: mw. drs. S.J. de Leeuw
- Teaching staff: c. 50
- Enrollment: c. 630
- Website: http://www.marnixgymnasium.nl/

The Marnix, het Rotterdamse Gymnasium is a school located in Rotterdam, Netherlands. The school is named after Philips of Marnix, lord of Saint-Aldegonde. It teaches secondary education in the Netherlands and prepares students for a tertiary education at Dutch universities.

== History ==
The school was founded in 1903. Its naming after the Calvinist Philips of Marnix was done out of deliberate jealousy of the name of the Gymnasium Erasmianum, which is named after the far more famous humanist Desiderius Erasmus.

After the Second World War the then deputy head of the school, Jan Karsemeijer, had to go into hiding from the authorities. He had published an article on the teaching of literature that was openly applauding Nazi thought.

School has moved twice in its history. First in 1927, and a third time some three decades ago. It is currently located near Diergaarde Blijdorp. In 2003 the school celebrated its last centennial. These celebrations included a speech by Maria van der Hoeven, the Minister of Education, Culture and Science.

== Curriculum ==
The Marnix Gymnasium teaches the gymnasium variant of special education. This means that it normally takes six years to complete the curriculum and that Ancient Greek, Latin and a general course on antiquity (KCV) are compulsory subjects in addition to the normal college preparatory courses. In 2006 the school became the first in Rotterdam to offer Russian as an optional subject.

== Notable people ==
=== Alumni ===
- Willem Aantjes (1923), politician
- Dirk Willem van Krevelen, chemical engineer and scientist
- Johan Herman Bavinck (1895), missionary and theologian
- Gerard van Walsum (1900), former mayor of Rotterdam
