= Dirk Willem van Krevelen =

- Born: 8 November 1914; Rotterdam, Netherlands
- Died: 27 October 2001 (aged 86); Arnhem, Netherlands
- Education: Delft University of Technology

Dirk Willem van Krevelen (8 November 1914, Rotterdam – 27 October 2001, Arnhem) was a prominent Dutch chemical engineer, coal and polymer scientist. He successfully combined an industrial career, managing a research division at DSM, and an academic career, as a professor of Delft Technical College. His contributions span a wide range of research fields, and his name is linked to the van Krevelen–Hoftyzer diagram for chemical gas absorption, the Mars–van Krevelen mechanism for catalytic oxidation reactions, the van Krevelen–Chermin method to estimate the free energy of organic compounds, the van Krevelen diagram that is used in coal and coal processes, the van Krevelen method to calculate additive properties of polymers, and the van Krevelen–Hoftyzer relationship on the viscosity of polymer fluids.

He is the author of numerous scientific publications and several classic monographs, amongst which are Coal: Typology, Chemistry, Physics, Constitution and Properties of Polymers: Correlations with Chemical Structure.

== Early life ==
Dirk van Krevelen was born in Rotterdam to the family of bookkeeper Dirk Willem van Krevelen Sr and Huberta van Krevelen (née Regoort).

== Education ==
From 1927 to 1933 he studied at Marnix Gymnasium in Rotterdam. In 1933 he was enrolled at Leiden University and studied chemistry under Anton Eduard van Arkel. There he received his "kandidaats" (bachelor) degree in 1935 and "doctoraal" (masters) degree in 1938. In parallel, van Krevelen also completed his minor in chemical technology under Professor Hein Israël Waterman at Delft Technical College.

== Career ==
At the time when Dirk van Krevelen worked with Professor Waterman, Mr Waterman was a scientific advisor to Royal Dutch Shell, who funded the employment of three private assistants that performed fundamental research on oil products and processes. As of 1937, van Krevelen was employed as one of these assistants to Professor Waterman, and worked on three topics: the chemical thermodynamics of oil hydrocarbons, the polymerization of ethylene, as part of attempts to improve the anti-knock properties of gasoline, and the induced pyrolysis of methane. The latter project became the topic of his doctorate (1939).

When, at the start of World War II Shell stopped employing new scientists, soon Professor Waterman, who was a Jew, was forced to retire from Shell. Yet he managed to help Dirk van Krevelen to obtain a research position in the newly created Central Laboratory of the Dutch State Mines (DSM) starting from 1940. The Central Laboratory was headed by Gerrit Berkhoff. van Krevelen began his research activities in DSM's physical chemistry department. In 1943, van Krevelen became a department manager, as head of the newly created research department on chemical engineering. In 1948, he was promoted to the position of research leader of the Central Laboratory of DSM, a position where he was responsible for directing the research activities. In 1955, van Krevelen became head of the Central Laboratory.

In 1959, van Krevelen left DSM and joined the Algemene Kunstzijde Unie (AKU; General Rayon Union), a polymer company. van Krevelen became member of the board of directors of AKU with the special task of supervising the research and development activities of the company.

In 1969, AKU merged with the Koninklijke Zout Organon (KZO) in 1969 to become AKZO. van Krevelen became president of AKZO Research and Engineering, until he retired from AKZO in 1976.

== Contributions ==
In 1951, van Krevelen was one of the founding editors of the journal Chemical Engineering Science. van Krevelen took also part in the organization of the 1st European Symposium on Chemical Reaction Engineering which was held in Amsterdam in 1957.

== Private life ==
In July 1939 Dirk van Krevelen married Frieda Kreisel. They had three sons and one daughter.

== Death ==
Dirk Willem van Krevelen died on 27 October 2001 in Arnhem.

== Selected works ==
- De geïnduceerde pyrolyse van methaan. Dissertation, Technological University of Delft, 19 December 1939.
- With H. A. J. Pieters. The Wet Purification of Coal Gas and Similar Gases by the Staatsmijnen-Otto-Process New York: Elsevier, 1946.
- With P. J. Hoftijzer. Kinetics of Gas-Liquid Reactions. Part I:General Theory. Recueil des Travaux Chimiques des Pays-Bas 67 (1948): 563–568.
- Graphical-statistical Method for the Study of Structure and Reaction Processes of Coal. Fuel 29 (1950): 269–283.
- With H. A. G. Chermin. Estimation of the Free Enthalpy (Gibbs Free Energy) of Formation of Organic Compounds from Group Contributions. Chemical Engineering Science 1 (1951): 66–80, 238.
- With P. Mars. Oxidations Carried Out by Means of Vanadium Oxide Catalysts. Proceedings of the Conference on Oxidation Processes, Held in Amsterdam, 6–8 May 1954. Special Supplement to Chemical Engineering Science 3 (1954): 41–57 doi:10.1016/S0009-2509(54)80005-4.
- Coal: Typology, Chemistry, Physics, Constitution. Amsterdam:Elsevier, 1961. [First edition, 1957, published (with Jan Schuijer) as Coal Science: Aspects of Coal Constitution.] 3rd ed.,1981; 4th ed., 1993.
- Waterman en de steenkoolchemie. In De Oogst: een overzicht van het wetenschappelijk werk van Prof. dr. ir. H. I. Waterman, te zamen gebracht ter gelegenheid van zijn aftreden als hoogleraar in de chemische technologie aan de Technische Hogeschool te Delft, pp. 24–29, n.p., n.d. [Delft, 1959].
- Werdegang und Weg in der chemischen Technologie: Arbeitserinnerungen und Ausblick. Darmstadt: Technische Hochschule, 1966. Lecture given on the occasion of receiving the honorary doctorate.
- With P. J. Hoftyzer. Properties of Polymers: Correlations with Chemical Structure. Amsterdam: Elsevier, 1972; 2nd ed., 1976; 3rd ed., 1990.
- Selected Papers on Chemical Engineering Science. Amsterdam:Elsevier, 1976.
- In Retrospect: Een keuze uit de voordrachten. Amsterdam: Meulenhoff, 1980. With a comprehensive bibliography of his over 250 publications up to 1980.
- Sleutelwoorden in de proefondervindelijke wijsbegeerte. Rotterdam: Bataafsch Genootschap, 1987.
- Professor Hein Israel Waterman, 1889–1961: Onderzoeker—Vernieuwer—Leermeester.” In Waterman Symposium: Aula TU Delft, 28 April 1989, voordrachtenbundel, 72–84. Delft: Technische Universiteit Delft, 1989.
- Vijftig jaar activiteit in de Chemische Technologie. In Werken aan scheikunde. 24 memoires van hen die de Nederlandse chemie deze eeuw groot hebben gemaakt, 243–263. Delft: Delft University Press, 1993. His autobiography.
