= Petroleum geology =

Field in geology

Petroleum geology is the study of the origins, occurrence, movement, accumulation, and exploration of hydrocarbon fuels. It refers to the specific set of geological disciplines that are applied to the search for hydrocarbons (oil exploration).

== Sedimentary basin analysis ==
Petroleum geology is principally concerned with the evaluation of seven key elements in sedimentary basins:

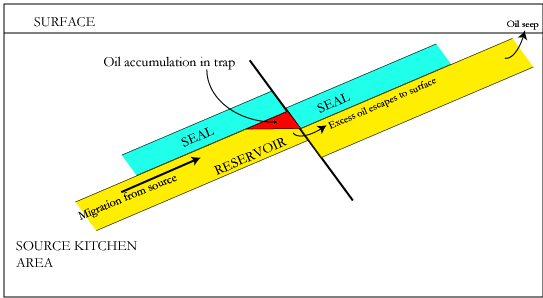
A structural trap, where a fault has juxtaposed a porous and permeable reservoir against an impermeable seal. Oil (shown in red) accumulates against the seal, to the depth of the base of the seal. Any further oil migrating in from the source will escape to the surface and seep.

- Source
- Reservoir
- Seal
- Trap
- Timing
- Maturation
- Migration

In general, all these elements must be assessed via a limited 'window' into the subsurface world, provided by one (or possibly more) exploration wells. These wells present only a one-dimensional segment through the Earth, and the skill of inferring three-dimensional characteristics from them is one of the most fundamental in petroleum geology. Recently, the availability of inexpensive, high-quality 3D seismic data (from reflection seismology) and data from various electromagnetic geophysical techniques (such as magnetotellurics) has greatly aided the accuracy of such interpretation. The following section discusses these elements in brief. For a more in-depth treatise, see the second half of this article below.

Evaluation of the source uses the methods of geochemistry to quantify the nature of organic-rich rocks which contain the precursors to hydrocarbons, such that the type and quality of expelled hydrocarbon can be assessed.

The reservoir is a porous and permeable lithological unit or set of units that holds the hydrocarbon reserves. Analysis of reservoirs at the simplest level requires an assessment of their porosity (to calculate the volume of in situ hydrocarbons) and their permeability (to calculate how easily hydrocarbons will flow out of them). Some of the key disciplines used in reservoir analysis are the fields of structural analysis, stratigraphy, sedimentology, and reservoir engineering.

The seal, or cap rock, is a unit with low permeability that impedes the escape of hydrocarbons from the reservoir rock. Common seals include evaporites, chalks and shales. Analysis of seals involves assessment of their thickness and extent, such that their effectiveness can be quantified.

The geological trap is the stratigraphic or structural feature that ensures the juxtaposition of reservoir and seal such that hydrocarbons remain trapped in the subsurface, rather than escaping (due to their natural buoyancy) and being lost.

Analysis of maturation involves assessing the thermal history of the source rock in order to make predictions of the amount and timing of hydrocarbon generation and expulsion.

Finally, careful studies of migration reveal information on how hydrocarbons move from source to reservoir and help quantify the source (or kitchen) of hydrocarbons in a particular area.

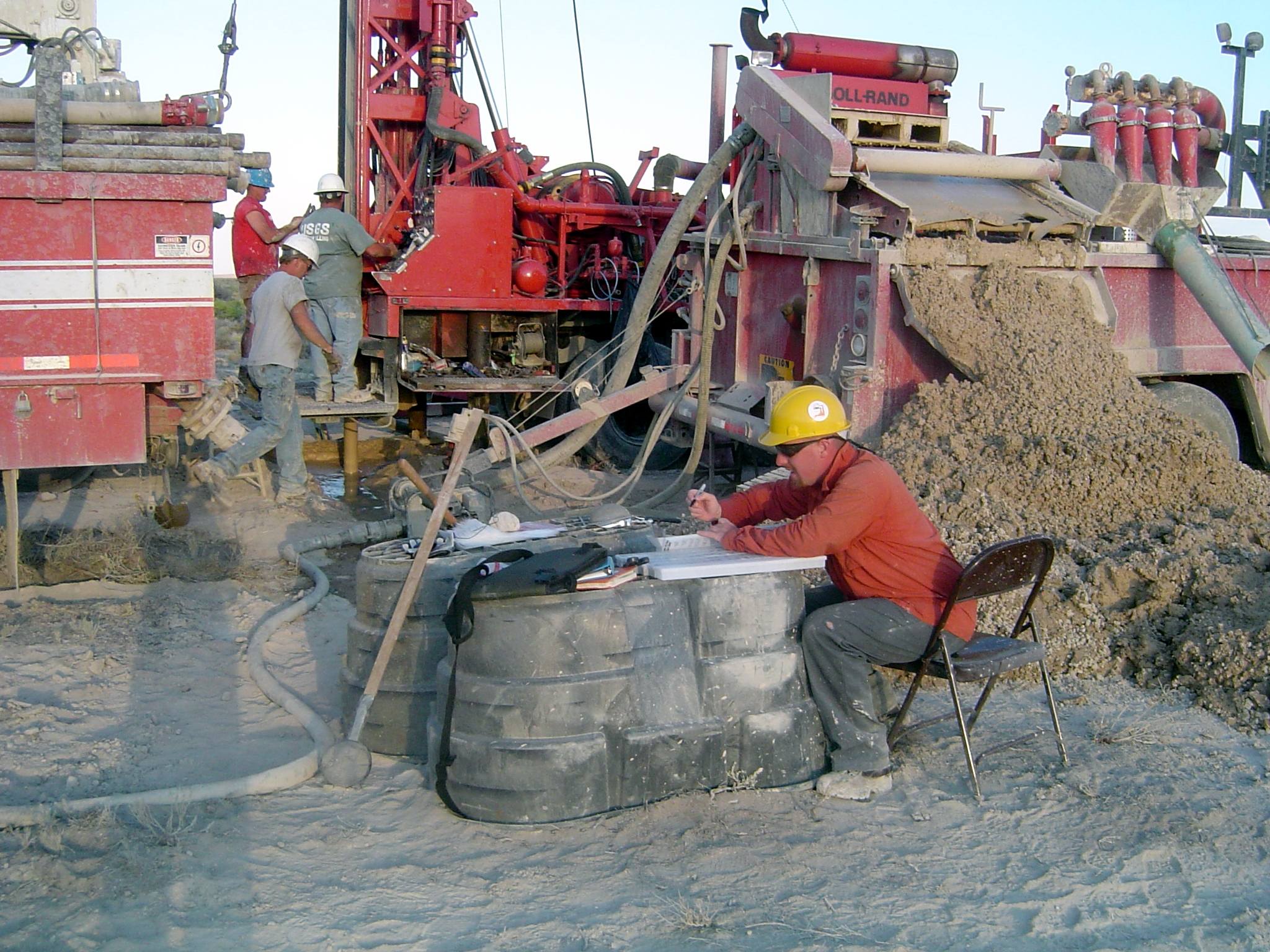
Mud log in process, a common way to study the lithology when drilling oil wells.

== Major subdisciplines in petroleum geology ==
Several major subdisciplines exist in petroleum geology specifically to study the seven key elements discussed above.

=== Critical moment ===
The critical moment is the time of the generation, migration, and accumulation of most hydrocarbons in their primary traps. The migration and accumulation of hydrocarbons occur over a short period in relation to geologic time. These processes (generation, migration, and accumulation) occur near the end of a duration of a petroleum system. The duration being the time crucial elements of the petroleum system are being accumulated.

The critical moment is crucial since it is based on the burial history of the source rock when it is at maximum burial depth. This is when most of the hydrocarbons are generated. Approximately 50%-90% petroleum is made and expelled at this point. The next step is the hydrocarbons entering the oil window. The oil window has to do with the source rock being the appropriate maturity, and also being at the right depth for oil exploration. Geoscientists will need this to gather stratigraphic data of the petroleum system for analysis.

=== Source rock analysis ===
In terms of source rock analysis, several facts need to be established. Firstly, the question of whether there actually is any source rock in the area must be answered. Delineation and identification of potential source rocks depends on studies of the local stratigraphy, palaeogeography and sedimentology to determine the likelihood of organic-rich sediments having been deposited in the past.

If the likelihood of there being a source rock is thought to be high, the next matter to address is the state of thermal maturity of the source, and the timing of maturation. Maturation of source rocks (see diagenesis and fossil fuels) depends strongly on temperature, such that the majority of oil generation occurs in the 60 to 120 °C (140 to 248 °F) range. Gas generation starts at similar temperatures, but may continue up beyond this range, perhaps as high as 200 °C (392 °F). In order to determine the likelihood of oil/gas generation, therefore, the thermal history of the source rock must be calculated. This is performed with a combination of geochemical analysis of the source rock (to determine the type of kerogens present and their maturation characteristics) and basin modelling methods, such as back-stripping, to model the thermal gradient in the sedimentary column.

=== Geochemical analysis ===
The mid-twentieth century was when scientists began to seriously study petroleum geochemistry. Geochemistry was originally utilized for surface prospecting for subsurface hydrocarbons. Today geochemistry serves the petroleum industry by helping seek out effective petroleum systems. The use of geochemistry is relatively cost-effective that allows geologists to assess reservoir-related issues. Once oil to source rock correlation is found, petroleum geologists will use this information to render a 3D model of the basin. Now they can assess the timing of generation, migration, and accumulation relative to the trap formation. This aids in the decision-making process on whether further exploration is necessary. Additionally, this can increase recoveries of the petroleum remaining in reservoirs that were initially deemed unrecoverable.

=== Basin analysis ===
A full scale basin analysis is usually carried out prior to defining leads and prospects for future drilling. This study tackles the petroleum system and studies source rock (presence and quality); burial history; maturation (timing and volumes); migration and focus; and potential regional seals and major reservoir units (that define carrier beds). All these elements are used to investigate where potential hydrocarbons might migrate towards. Traps and potential leads and prospects are then defined in the area that is likely to have received hydrocarbons.

=== Exploration stage ===
Although a basin analysis is usually part of the first study a company conducts prior to moving into an area for future exploration, it is also sometimes conducted during the exploration phase. Exploration geology comprises all the activities and studies necessary for finding new hydrocarbon occurrence. Usually seismic (or 3D seismic) studies are shot, and old exploration data (seismic lines, well logs, reports) are used to expand upon the new studies. Sometimes gravity and magnetic studies are conducted, and oil seeps and spills are mapped to find potential areas for hydrocarbon occurrences. As soon as a significant hydrocarbon occurrence is found by an exploration- or wildcat-well, the appraisal stage starts.

=== Appraisal stage ===
The appraisal stage is used to delineate the extent of the discovery. Hydrocarbon reservoir properties, connectivity, hydrocarbon type and gas-oil and oil-water contacts are determined to calculate potential recoverable volumes. This is usually done by drilling more appraisal wells around the initial exploration well. Production tests may also give insight in reservoir pressures and connectivity. Geochemical and petrophysical analysis gives information on the type (viscosity, chemistry, API, carbon content, etc.) of the hydrocarbon and the nature of the reservoir (porosity, permeability, etc.).

=== Production stage ===
After a hydrocarbon occurrence has been discovered and appraisal has indicated it is a commercial find, the production stage is initiated. This stage focuses on extracting the hydrocarbons in a controlled way (without damaging the formation, within commercial favorable volumes, etc.). Production wells are drilled and completed in strategic positions. 3D seismic is usually available by this stage to target wells precisely for optimal recovery. Sometimes enhanced recovery (steam injection, pumps, etc.) is used to extract more hydrocarbons or to redevelop abandoned fields.

=== Reservoir analysis ===
The existence of a reservoir rock (typically, sandstones and fractured limestones) is determined through a combination of regional studies (i.e. analysis of other wells in the area), stratigraphy and sedimentology (to quantify the pattern and extent of sedimentation) and seismic interpretation. Once a possible hydrocarbon reservoir is identified, the key physical characteristics of a reservoir that are of interest to a hydrocarbon explorationist are its bulk rock volume, net-to-gross ratio, porosity and permeability.

Bulk rock volume, or the gross rock volume of rock above any hydrocarbon-water contact, is determined by mapping and correlating sedimentary packages. The net-to-gross ratio, typically estimated from analogues and wireline logs, is used to calculate the proportion of the sedimentary packages that contains reservoir rocks. The bulk rock volume multiplied by the net-to-gross ratio gives the net rock volume of the reservoir. The net rock volume multiplied by porosity gives the total hydrocarbon pore volume, i.e. the volume within the sedimentary package that fluids (importantly, hydrocarbons and water) can occupy. The summation of these volumes (see STOIIP and GIIP) for a given exploration prospect will allow explorers and commercial analysts to determine whether a prospect is financially viable.

Traditionally, porosity and permeability were determined through the study of drilling samples, analysis of cores obtained from the wellbore, examination of contiguous parts of the reservoir that outcrop at the surface and by the technique of formation evaluation using wireline tools passed down the well itself. Modern advances in seismic data acquisition and processing have meant that seismic attributes of subsurface rocks are readily available and can be used to infer physical/sedimentary properties of the rocks themselves.

== See also ==
- Bituminous rocks
- Controlled source electro-magnetic
