= Kostivere Landscape Conservation Area =

Protected area in Estonia

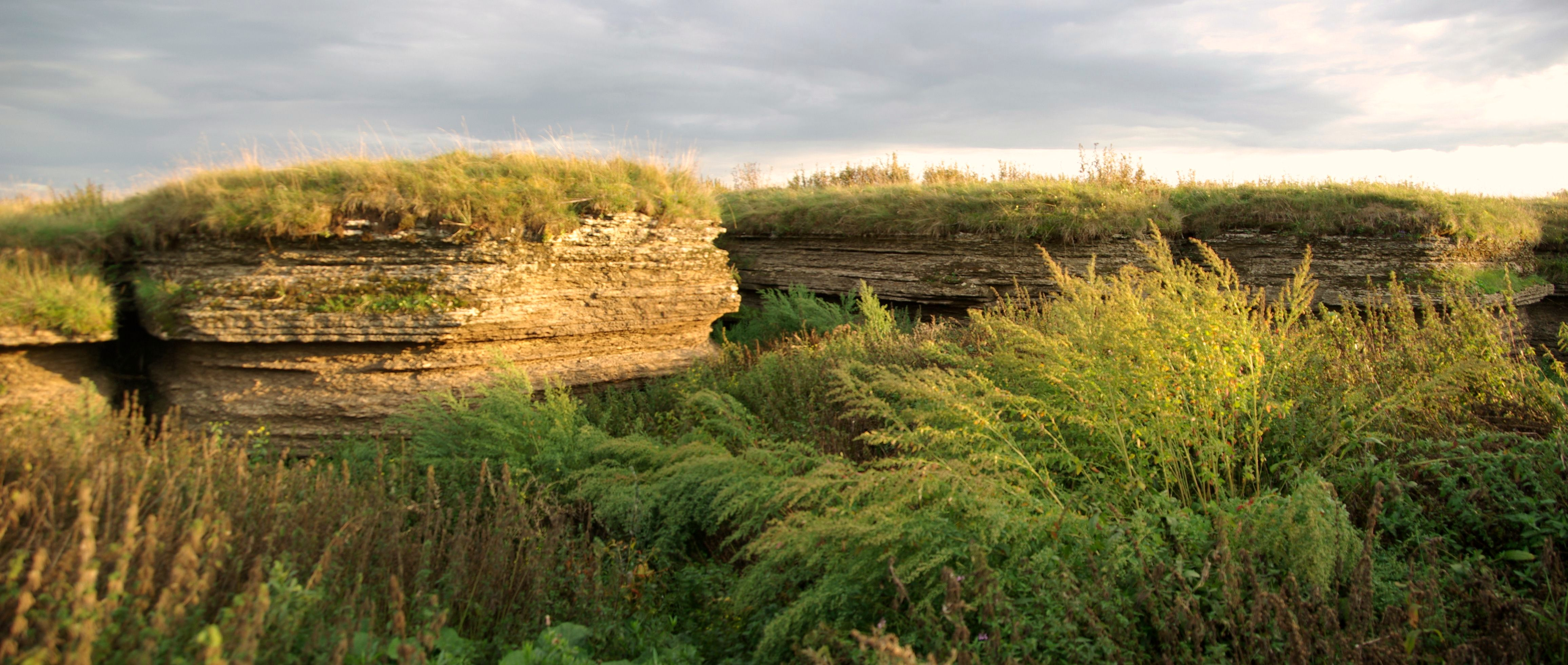

- Location within Estonia
- Location: Estonia
- Coordinates: 59°26′10″N 25°07′00″E
- Area: 112 ha (280 acres)
- Established: 1959

Kostivere Landscape Conservation Area is a nature park situated in Harju County, Estonia.

Its area is 112 ha (280 acres).

The protected area was designated in 1959 to protect Kostivere Karst Area and its surrounding areas.
