= Basin modelling =

Basin modelling is the term broadly applied to a group of geological disciplines that can be used to analyse the formation and evolution of sedimentary basins, often but not exclusively to aid evaluation of potential hydrocarbon reserves.

At its most basic, a basin modelling exercise must assess:

1. The burial history of the basin (see back-stripping).
2. The thermal history of the basin (see thermal history modelling).
3. The maturity history of the source rocks.
4. The expulsion, migration and trapping of hydrocarbons.

By doing so, valuable inferences can be made about such matters as hydrocarbon generation and timing, maturity of potential source rocks and migration paths of expelled hydrocarbons.

== Basin modelling software ==
Software packages have been designed for 1D/2D/3D basin modelling purposes to simulate the burial and thermal history of a basin as well as petroleum migration modelling. Basin Modeling software programs: Permedia (Halliburton), PBM-Pars Basin Modeler(Research Institute of Petroleum Industry), PetroMod (Schlumberger), BasinMod (Platte River Associates, Inc.), Genex, Temis 2D, 3D (Beicip/IFP), Migri, MigriX (Migris), Sigma2D (JNOC/TRC), Novva (Sirius Exploration Geochemistry Inc.), Genesis-Trinity(Zetaware), and WinBury software.

== Basin modelling publications ==
- Basin Modeling Publications
