= Source rock =

Rock which has generated hydrocarbons

In petroleum geology, source rock is a sedimentary rock which has generated hydrocarbons or which has the potential to generate hydrocarbons. Source rocks are one of the necessary elements of a working petroleum system. They are organic-rich sediments that may have been deposited in a variety of environments including deep water marine, lacustrine and deltaic. Oil shale can be regarded as an organic-rich but immature source rock from which little or no oil has been generated and expelled. Subsurface source rock mapping methodologies make it possible to identify likely zones of petroleum occurrence in sedimentary basins as well as shale gas plays.

== Types of source rocks ==
Source rocks are classified from the types of kerogen that they contain, which in turn governs the type of hydrocarbons that will be generated:

- Type I source rocks are formed from algal remains deposited under anoxic conditions in deep lakes: they tend to generate waxy crude oils when submitted to thermal stress during deep burial.
- Type II source rocks are formed from marine planktonic and bacterial remains preserved under anoxic conditions in marine environments: they produce both oil and gas when thermally cracked during deep burial.
- Type III source rocks are formed from terrestrial plant material that has been decomposed by bacteria and fungi under oxic or sub-oxic conditions: they tend to generate mostly gas with associated light oils when thermally cracked during deep burial. Most coals and coaly shales are generally Type III source rocks.

== Maturation and expulsion ==
With increasing depth of burial by sediments or dead organic matter and increase in temperature, the kerogen within the rock begins to break down. This thermal degradation or cracking releases shorter chain hydrocarbons from the original large and complex molecules occurring in the kerogen.

The hydrocarbons generated from thermally mature source rock are first expelled, along with other pore fluids, due to the effects of internal source rock over-pressuring caused by hydrocarbon generation as well as by compaction. Once released into porous and permeable carrier beds or into faults planes, oil and gas then move upwards towards the surface in an overall buoyancy-driven process known as secondary migration.

== Mapping source rocks in sedimentary basins ==
Areas underlain by thermally mature generative source rocks in a sedimentary basin are called generative basins or depressions or else hydrocarbon kitchens. Mapping those regional oil and gas generative "hydrocarbon kitchens" is feasible by integrating the existing source rock data into seismic depth maps that structurally follow the source horizon(s). It has been statistically observed at a world scale that zones of high success ratios in finding oil and gas generally correlate in most basin types (such as intracratonic or rift basins) with the mapped "generative depressions". Cases of long distance oil migration into shallow traps away from the "generative depressions" are usually found in foreland basins.

Besides pointing to zones of high petroleum potential within a sedimentary basin, subsurface mapping of a source rock's degree of thermal maturity is also the basic tool to identify and broadly delineate shale gas plays.

== World class source rocks ==
Certain source rocks are referred to as "world class", meaning that they are not only of very high quality but are also thick and of wide geographical distribution. Examples include:

- Middle Devonian to lower Mississippian widespread marine anoxic oil and gas source beds in the Mid-Continent and Appalachia areas of North America: (e.g. the Bakken Formation of the Williston Basin, the Antrim Shale of the Michigan Basin, the Marcellus Shale of the Appalachian Basin).
- Kimmeridge Clay – This upper Jurassic marine mudstone or its stratigraphic equivalents generated most of the oil found in the North Sea and the Norwegian Sea.
- La Luna Formation – This Late Cretaceous (mostly Turonian) formation generated most of the oil in northwestern Venezuela.
- Late Carboniferous coals – Coals of this age generated most of the gas in the southern North Sea, the Netherlands Basin and the northwest German Basin.
- Hanifa Formation – This upper Jurassic laminated carbonate-rich unit has sourced the oil in the giant Ghawar field in Saudi Arabia.

== See also ==
- Basin modelling
