= Back-stripping =

Geophysical analysis technique

Back-stripping (also back stripping or backstripping) is a geophysical analysis technique used on sedimentary rock sequences. It is used to quantitatively estimate the depth that the basement would be in the absence of sediment and water loading. This depth provides a measure of the unknown tectonic driving forces that are responsible for basin formation (otherwise known as tectonic subsidence or uplift). By comparing backstripped curves to theoretical curves for basin subsidence and uplift it is possible to deduce information on the basin forming mechanisms.

The technique developed by Watts & Ryan in 1976 allows for the recovery of the basement subsidence and uplift history in the absence of sediment and water loading and, therefore isolate the contribution from the tectonic forces responsible for the formation of a rift basin. It is a method by which successive layers of basin fill sediment are "stripped off" the total stratigraphy during analysis of that basin's history. In a typical scenario, a sedimentary basin deepens away from a marginal flexure, and the accompanying isochronous strata typically thicken basinward. By isolating the isochronous packages one-by-one, these can be "peeled off" or backstripped - and the lower bounding surface rotated upward to a datum. By successively backstripping isochrons, the basin's deepening history can be plotted in reverse, leading to clues as to its tectonic or isostatic origin. A more complete analysis uses decompaction of the remaining sequence following each stage of the back-stripping. This takes into account the amount of compaction caused by the loading of the later layers and allows a better estimation of the depositional thickness of the remaining layers and the variation of water depth with time.

== General Theory ==
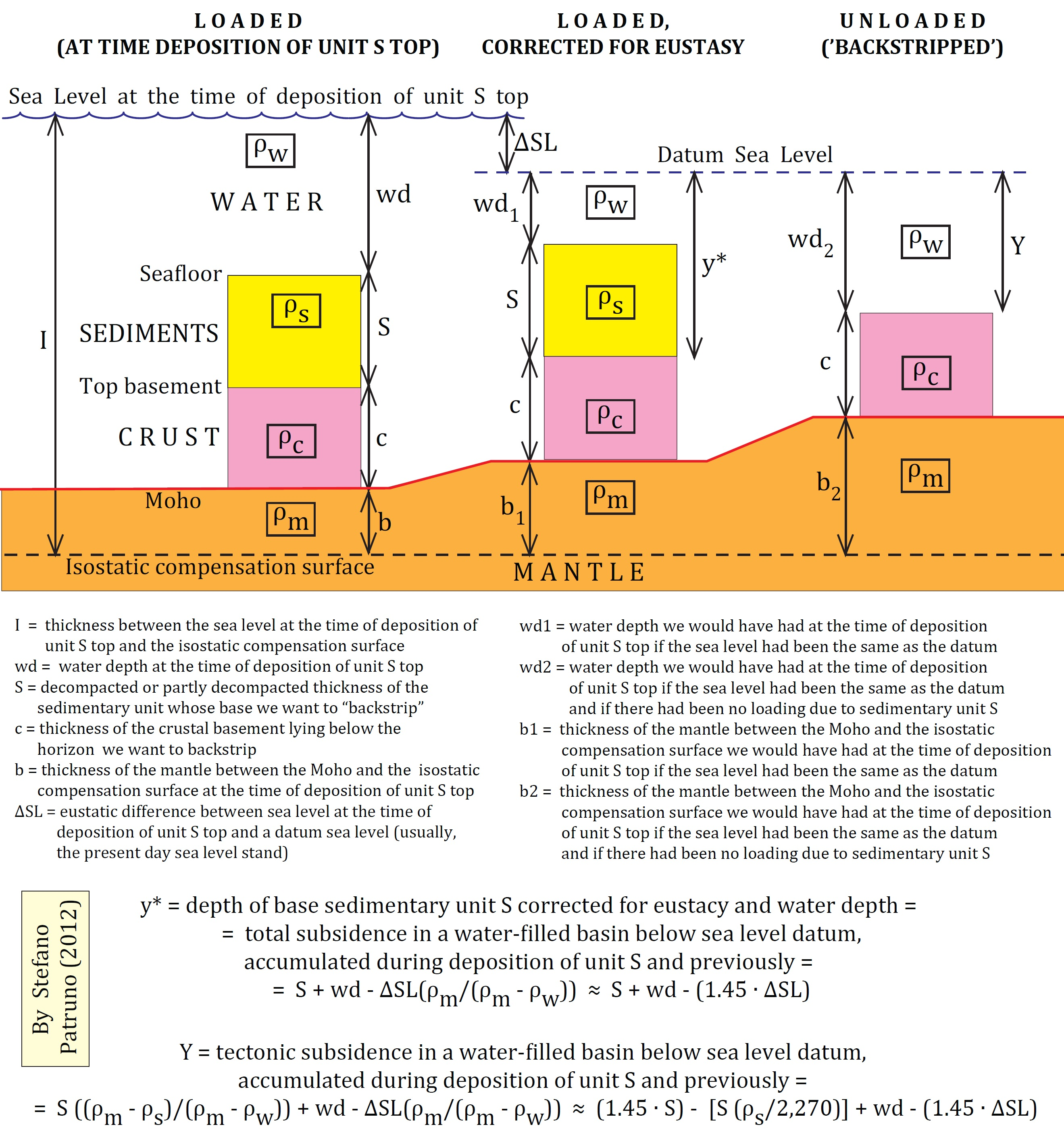
Schematic diagram of the back-stripping technique relating to equation (2). The loaded column relates to equation (3), and the unloaded column to equations (4) and (5)

As a result of their porosity, sedimentary strata are compacted by overlaying sedimentary layers after deposition. Consequently, the thickness of each layer in a sedimentary sequence was larger at the time of its deposition than it is when measured in the field. In order to consider the influence of sediment compaction on the thickness and density of the stratigraphic column, the porosity must be known. Empirical studies show that the porosity of rocks decreases exponentially with depth. In general we can describe this with the relationship:

$\phi = \phi_0 e^{-cz}$	1

where $\phi$ is the porosity of the rock at depth $z$, $\phi_0$ is the porosity at the surface and $c$ is a rock specific compaction constant.

=== Back-stripping Equation ===
The fundamental equation in back-stripping corrects the observed stratigraphic record for the effects of sediment and water loading and changes in water depth, and is given by:

$Y=S \cdot \frac{(\rho_m-\rho_s)}{(\rho_m-\rho_w)}+W_d - \Delta_{SL} \cdot \frac{\rho_m}{(\rho_m - \rho_w)}$	2

where $Y$ is the tectonically driven subsidence, $S$ is the decompacted sediment thickness, $\rho_s$ is the mean sediment density, $W_d$ is the average depth at which the sedimentary units were deposited, $\rho_w$ and $\rho_m$ are the densities of the water and mantle respectively, and $\Delta_{SL}$ the difference in sea-level height between the Present and the time at which the sediments were deposited. The three independent terms account for the contributions of sediment loading, water depth and sea-level oscillations to the subsidence of the basin.

=== Derivation ===
To derive equation (2) one should first consider a 'loaded' column that represents a sedimentary unit accumulated over a certain geological time period, and a corresponding 'unloaded' column that represents the position of the underlying basement without the effects of the sediments. In the scenario, the pressure at the base of the loaded column, is given by:

$W_d\rho_wg+S\rho_sg+c\rho_cg$	3

where $W_d$ is the water depth of deposition, $c$ is the mean thickness of the crust, $S$ is the sediment thickness corrected for compaction, $g$ is the average gravity and $\rho_w$,$\rho_s$ and $\rho_c$ are the densities of water, the sediment and the crust respectively. The pressure at the base of the unloaded column is given by:

$Y\rho_wg+c\rho_cg+b\rho_mg$	4

where $Y$ is the tectonic or corrected subsidence, $\rho_m$ is the density of the mantle, and $b$ is the distance from the base of the unloaded crust to the depth of compensation (which is assumed to be at the base of the loaded crust) and is given by:

$b=S+W_d-\Delta_{SL}-Y$	5

Substitution of (3),(4) and (5) after simplifying, we obtain (2).

== Multi-layer Case ==
For a multi-layered sedimentary basin, it is necessary to successively back-strip each individually identifiable layer separately to obtain a complete evolution of the tectonic subsidence. Using equation (2), a complete subsidence analysis is performed by stepwise removal of the top layer at any one stage during the analysis and performing back-stripping as if for a single layer case. For the remaining column, mean densities and thickness must be used at each time, or calculation, step. Equation (2) then becomes the tectonic amount of subsidence during sedimentation of the top most layer only. In this case $L^*$ and $\rho_L$ can be defined as the thickness and density of the entire remaining sedimentary column after removal of the top layer $l$ (i.e. the decompacted thickness). The thickness of a sediment pile with $l$ layers is then:

$L^* = \sum_{j=1}^l L_j$	6

The density of the sedimentary column underneath layer $l$ is given by the mean density of all the remaining layers. This is the sum of all the densities of the remaining layers multiplied by the respective thickness and divided by $L^*$:

$\rho_{L^*}=\frac{\sum_{j=1}^l L_j (\phi_j\rho_w + (1-\phi_j)\rho_g)}{L^*}$	7

Effectively you iteratively apply (1) and (2) using $L^*$ and $\rho_{L^*}$ instead of $L$ and $\rho_L$.
