= Denison Trough =

Geological feature in Queensland, Australia

The rough location of the Denison Trough within Queensland

The Denison Trough is a geological feature that has developed into a hydrocarbon province. Located in Central Queensland, it covers much of the western Bowen Basin. Its sediments were laid down during various geologic eras, and at its deepest the trough contains 6.5 kilometres (4.0 mi) of deposits from the Permian and Triassic. The Denison Trough shares some hydrocarbons with other parts of the Bowen Basin, but has become particularly notable for its natural gas reserves, some of which have been commercially extracted.

The main part of the Denison Trough formed during the Permian and Early to Mid-Triassic. Geological formations from this period overlie sediment from the Devonian, with little or no Carboniferous material in between. The formations found provide evidence of different environmental periods, as what became the Denison Trough was at various times a riverine, perhaps swampy, environment, and at other times was coastal or part of a shallow sea. The shifting environment is reflected both in the sediment material of different formations, and the fossils found within these sediments.

Geologic surveys of the area began in the 1920s, and accelerated in the 1960s after oil was found nearby. Various hydrocarbon pockets were found by different companies in the decades following, a majority of which was found within one formation referred to as the Aldebaran Sandstone. The completion of a gas pipeline to Gladstone in 1990 allowed for gas to be more easily transported and then exported. The natural gas produced in this trough often has high levels of carbon dioxide, although the reasons for this have not been determined.

== Location ==
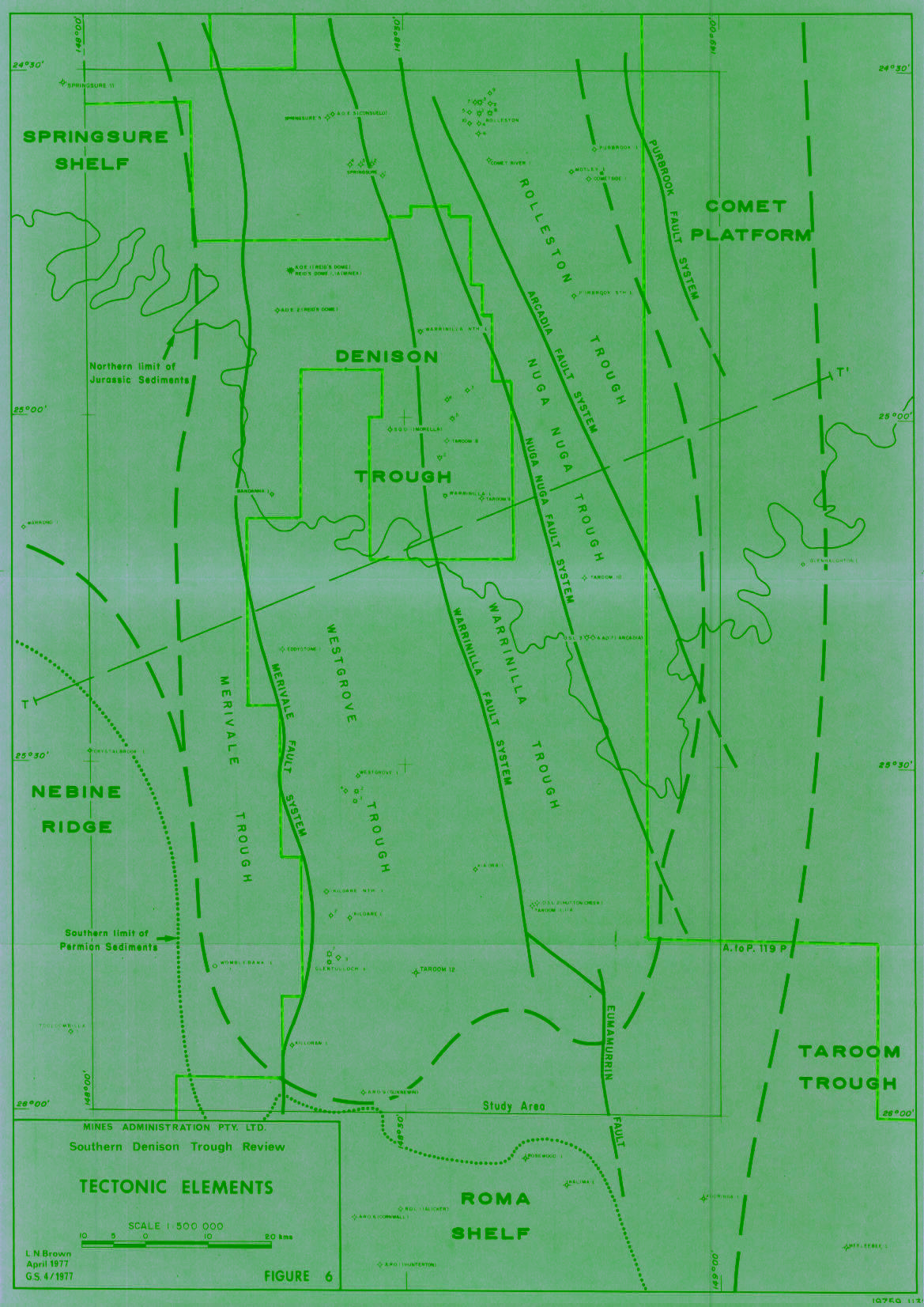
Denison Trough and surrounding geological features

The Denison Trough makes up the western part of the Bowen Basin, elongated in a roughly north–south direction. The Denison Trough is one of the two depocentres of the Bowen Basin, although the Denison Trough is less thick than the other depocentre, the Taroom Trough. The two troughs are separated by the Comet Platform. To the west of the Denison Trough are the Springsure Shelf and Nebine Ridge. The south is overlaid by the Surat Basin, where the southern border of the Denison Trough meets the Roma shelf.

This area covers around 23,000 square kilometres (8,880 sq mi) of Central Queensland. It is traversed by the Dawson Highway, and significant settlements include Injune and Rolleston. The climate shifts between wet summers from November to March, in which rainfall is often over 550 millimetres (22 in), and dry winters with some frost.

== Formations ==
Rough stratigraphy of the Denison Trough (and Comet Platform)
Period		Formation
Triassic	Middle	Moolayember Formation
Triassic	Early	Clematis Group
Triassic	Early	Rewan Group
Permian	Late	Bandanna Formation
Permian	Late	Black Alley Shale
Permian	Late	Mantuan Formation
Permian	Late	Peawaddy Formation
Permian	Early	Catherine Sandstone
Permian	Early	Ingelara Formation
Permian	Early	Freitag Formation
Permian	Early	Aldebaran Sandstone
Permian	Early	Cattle Creek Formation
Permian	Early	Reids Dome Beds
Carboniferous		None
Devonian		Timbury Hills Formation

Most geological formations within the trough date from the Permian and Triassic. At the deepest point of the trough, these stack to a depth of 6.5 kilometres (4.0 mi). The various formations overlie in a series of north–south folds. These folds bring layers of different ages to the surface at different points. For example, at the Inglis Dome formation in the centre-west of the trough, formations ranging temporally from the Aldebaran Sandstone to the Bandanna Formation are exposed. At least one older interpretation of the geologic data divided the Denison Trough into four smaller troughs. While the upper and lower Permian layers are similar to those of surrounding areas, the middle Permian layers within the Denison Trough are distinct.

A series of deposits from the Permian include sediment from coastal areas and shallow seas, perhaps only 50 metres (160 ft) deep. Some formations show evidence of flooding, with peat swamp forest and other non-marine deposits being interrupted by small sections of marine deposits. Minerals within the formations include quartz, feldspar, kaolinite, illite, pyrite, calcite, and ankerite. The presence of clays has meant the sandstone has remained porous. Pyrite is present in coal deposits, likely related to flooding. The Catherine Sandstone formation shows evidence of oil formation from the coal deposits. Temperatures range from 20 °C (68 °F) at the surface to 75 °C (167 °F) at 400 metres (1,300 ft) deep.

The formations overlap with changes in brachiopod and microorganism fossil compositions. The Reids Dome beds contain many plant fossils, such as Glossopteris, as well as other fossils such as ostracods and bivalves. The Cattle Creek Formation has shell and plant fossils. Fossils found in the Aldebaran Sandstone include Cordaites, Skolithos burrows, shells, and vertebrate remains. Fossils found within the Freitag Formation include Terrakea, Ingelarella undulosa, Conulariida, and animal burrows. The Ingelara Formation includes animal burrows, as well as a wide variety of marine fossils, including bivalves, brachiopods, bryozoans, crinoids, and tabulate corals. The Catherine Sandstone formation contains similar fossils. The Peawaddy Formation also holds similar marine fossils, as well as Glossopteris and other wood fossils. The Black Alley Shale contains a large number of plant fossils, including representatives of Glossopteris, Neomariopteris, Phyllotheca, and Paracalamites. Lower parts of the Black Alley Shale contain marine fish scales, acritarchs, and foraminifera. Similar plant fossils are also found in the Bandanna Formation. Plant species fossils found in the trough resemble flora associated with India, reflecting biological links between former parts of Gondwana.

== Hydrocarbon resources ==
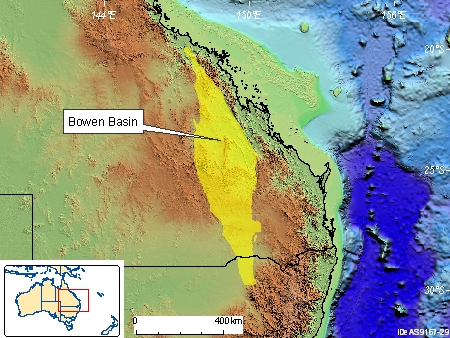
The Denison Trough lies within the larger Bowen Basin, other areas of which also hold hydrocarbon resources.

The Denison Trough is considered a hydrocarbon province, as it contains natural gas and coal. Most resources are locked within the Aldebaran Sandstone formation. Natural gas is the most distinctive feature of the Denison Trough itself, while coal is found throughout the Bowen Basin. Most of the Permian sediment in the Denison Trough is considered to be of the right age for hydrocarbon presence, although the deeper and older areas, such as the Reids Dome beds, may have been too hot. As of 1998, there was thought to be 2,931 million cubic metres (103.5×10^{9} cu ft) of recoverable gas in the trough. Some of the gas from the Denison Trough is exported to Southeast Asia.

The Reids Dome beds have a number of natural gas pools, although some have not been commercially viable. The Cattle Creek Formation, Aldebaran Sandstone, and Rewan Formation also have natural gas. In the Cattle Creek Formation, there is a large accumulation within sandstone deposits, especially in the western and southern areas of the trough. These makes those areas possible locations of more hydrocarbon reserves. Natural gas from the Aldebaran Sandstone has a high concentration of carbon dioxide, particularly in the south and southeast, which is also the richest area for gas. Many pockets of natural gas from the Aldebaran Sandstone formation within the Denison Trough have been commercially extracted. Some gas has also been commercially extracted from the Freitag Formation. The fine-grained sand of the Ingelera Formation formed a seal over the layers below it, and also contains some minor gas reserves. The Catherine Sandstone contains gas reserves in the trough's north, some of which has been commercially extracted. The overlying marine Peawaddy and Mantuan Formations have some commercially viable gas pockets in their northern non-marine areas. The marine Black Alley Shale forms a seal over these layers. As of 1996, only one gas pocket was found in the Rewan Formation within the Denison Trough, although the formation has additional gas pockets elsewhere. No hydrocarbons have been found in the Denison Trough portion of the Moolayember Formation.

Overall gas wetness in the Freitag Formation, Aldebaran Sandstone, and Cattle Creek Formations ranges from 8-12%. Gas in the Catherine Sandstone and Reids Dome beds may be drier. Theories for the high levels of carbon dioxide within the natural gas of the trough include biodegradation and the dissolution of calcium carbonate in groundwater. However, it is thought that it is not due to temperature changes.

The Arcturus gas accumulation contains 92-96% methane (considered "dry"), with only 0.25%-0.83% carbon dioxide. By June 1996, 286 million cubic metres (10.1×10^{9} cu ft) of the estimated 803 million cubic metres (28.4×10^{9} cu ft) had been extracted from the site. The Glentulloch gas accumulation is 84.5% methane and 10.75% carbon dioxide. Total gas in this accumulation has been estimated at 337 million cubic metres (11.9×10^{9} cu ft). Gas from the Aldebaran Sandstone portion of the Merivale gas accumulation (estimated to be 659 million cubic metres (23.3×10^{9} cu ft)) is 83.2% methane and 4.04% carbon dioxide, however gas from the Reids Dome beds portion (perhaps only 10% of the total accumulation) has almost no carbon dioxide. The Rolleston gas accumulation consists of three separate reservoirs, one in the Mantuan Formation (94% methane), one in the Freitag Formation (86% methane, 2.70% carbon dioxide), and one in the Aldebaran Sandstone (similar methane to the Freitag Formation reservoir, but only 0.20% carbon dioxide). The Mantuan and Freitag reservoirs make up 95% of the estimated 676 million cubic metres (23.9×10^{9} cu ft) in the accumulation, of which 372 million cubic metres (13.1×10^{9} cu ft) had been extracted by June 1996. The Aldebaran Sandstone reservoir at Westgrove is 67% methane and perhaps 30% carbon dioxide. The Reids Dome beds reservoir at Westgrove is only 1.5% carbon dioxide. A total of 362 million cubic metres (12.8×10^{9} cu ft) is thought to exist in these reservoirs. The Aldebaran Sandstone reservoir of the Yellowbank accumulation is 60% methane and over 30% carbon dioxide, whereas the Rewan Formation reservoir there has almost no carbon dioxide. 97% of the estimated 1,164 million cubic metres (41.1×10^{9} cu ft) initially recoverable gas is in the Aldebaran Sandstone reservoir. A Reids Dome beds reservoir found at the site was thought small and was not commercially developed. As of 1998, the Aldebaran Sandstone held over half of the trough's known natural gas reserves.

Gas from southern accumulations including Springvale, Myrtleville, Merivale, and Yellowbank is processed in the Denison Trough Central Treatment Plant. This has specialised equipment to prevent the high carbon dioxide levels of the gas from causing carbonic acid corrosion. Northern accumulations (including Rolleston, Springton, Arcturus, and Moorooloo) are processed in the Rolleston Gas Plant.

Coal deposits in the trough and wider basin are irregular and varied, reflecting a complicated geologic history. The maceral (components) of this coal are mostly vitrinite (predominantly as collotelinite), with smaller amounts of inertinite (mostly semifusinite and inertodetrinite) and liptinite (including sporinite, resinite, alginite, and cutinite). The Reids Dome Beds are known to have significant coal reserves. Thin seams of coal can also be found in the Cattle Creek Formation. The Bandanna Formation contains a large amount of coal in some areas.

== Geologic history ==
The deepest layer of the Denison Trough is a heavily eroded layer of metasedimentary rock from the Devonian, referred to as the Timbury Hills Formation. The earliest evidence of geologic activity is a number of half-grabens from either the late Carboniferous or the early Permian. It is possible that there is some Carboniferous sediment, the Roma Granite, but only in the very south and southwest edges of the trough. There may also be some volcanic sediment from the Early Permian that pre-dates the Reids Dome beds.

During the Permian, the area was around latitude 60°–65°. Today this correlates to a conifer forest environment, and the area at the time likely had a similar temperate or cool temperate climate. It was a coastal area, including both non-marine and marine deposits. It likely saw repeated flooding and erosion, which interrupted the formation of deposits such as the Aldebaran Sandstone and may have eventually halted its formation altogether.

The earliest evidence of tectonic activity comes from the Late Carboniferous. In the early Permian, the Reids Dome beds was deposited in the Denison Trough and surrounding areas due to extensional subsidence. The Reids Dome beds reaches a thickness of at least 4,000 metres (13,000 ft) near what is referred to as the Merivale Fault System. This formation mainly consists of material from rivers and swamps, rather than from marine water. Sediments including sandstone, siltstone, mudstone, and coal. Within the trough, a temporal gap divides the beds into upper and lower layers. The lower layer is mostly from rivers and swamps. The upper layer is made up of shale and coal in the north, and sand and other marine sediments in the south. There may have been some volcanic activity during this period.

The Reids Dome Beds are considered the earliest formation within what is called the Back Creek Group. This initial period of non-marine deposits was ended by a period in which the Bowen Basin was flooded from the east. Much of the Back Creek Group is formations created during the flooded period, deposited from the Early to Late Permian.

Overlying the Reids Dome Beds, the Cattle Creek formation was created during the initial flooding, showing evidence of the marine flooding retreating multiple times. While the Cattle Creek was deposited without a break onto the Reids Dome Beds in most areas, in the south and east of the trough the Reids Dome beds are eroded and the bottom of the Cattle Creek formation is a marine deposit. The Cattle Creek Formation reaches 750 metres (2,460 ft) in depth along the central axis of the Denison Trough. In the western and southern parts of the trough, the formation has a sandstone deposit in its middle indicating a retreating shoreline. In the very southern reaches of the trough, the Cattle Creek Formation is absent and so the Red Dome beds lie directly beneath the Aldebaran Sandstone formation.

The deposition of the Aldebaran Sandstone formation in much of the trough was caused by a major retreat of the ocean from the trough. The Aldebaran Sandstone is mostly made up of sediments from a river delta, likely flowing into the trough from the northwest. The entrance of the river into the trough was likely southwest of present-day Springsure. The delta met the sea in the south and east of the trough. The southwestern parts of the Aldebaran Sandstone formation have some marine sediments. There is a missing period of deposits in the middle of the Aldebaran Sandstone formation, indicating a period of reversed geologic activity along the Merivale Fault System.

The composition of the Aldebaran Sandstone varies throughout the trough. Its width is highly variable, with a maximum of around 700 metres (2,300 ft). The rise of the Comet Ridge next to the Denison Trough began at this time, with some of its material eroding into the trough. The Aldebaran Sandstone deposition was interrupted by erosion at least three times, before finally ending when the area again became submerged.

The coastal marine Freitag Formation, which is largely sand, lies on top of the Aldebaran Sandstone, indicating the movement of the sea over the delta. This period saw fewer sediments deposited than during the delta phase. The Freitag Formation is thicker in the trough's north, reaching a maximum thickness of possibly more than 150 metres (490 ft). The Ingelara Formation on top of the Freitag Formation reflects a marine, rather than coastal, environment. Its lower boundary has a large number of Micrhystridium keraloides (a kind of acritarch) fossils, coinciding with the transition from a riverine to a marine environment. Its upper boundary contains large amounts of Micrhystridium (a kind of Acanthomorphitae) fossils, which may indicate the marine water was very shallow at this time. The formation as a whole contains likely marine-originating silt and shale, as well as marine fossils. The thinner and patchy Catherine Sandstone formation lies on top of this, with its size and patchiness reflecting the small amount of sediment deposited from what was then the coastline and nearby shallow water. The Catherine Sandstone is both thin and consists of smaller grains towards the trough's east, and does not exist in the trough's south. This deposit pattern makes it a clastic wedge. Flora in the area during the deposition of sediments from the Aldebaran Sandstone to the Peawaddy Formation included gymnosperms and pteridophytes.

Formed at the start of the Late Permian, the Peawaddy Formation suggests the area was again a shallow marine environment. On top of this is the Mantuan Formation, which is mostly made up of coquina deposits, although in the northern part of the trough it is made up of non-marine sediments. The Black Alley Shale formation, regarded as the end of the Cattle Creek Group, has some volcanic sediment and indicates a reduction in marine sediment. Both the Peawaddy Formation and the upper Black Alley Shale have large numbers of gymnosperm wood fossils. The most common tree type in the Black Alley Shale is Glossopteris, with pteridophytes such as Neomariopteris being rarer. (It is unclear whether this rarity is due to differences in fossilisation rates or differences in actual abundance.)

The coal-filled Bandanna Formation lies on top of the Black Alley Shale, and thus on top of the Cattle Creek Group. Within the Denison Trough, there is a smooth transition between the Black Alley Shale formation and the Bandanna Formation, as well as between the Bandanna Formation and the Rewan Formation above it. Compression during the Late Permian and Triassic created anticlinal closures, which likely sealed off some pockets where hydrocarbons could then accumulate. (Some closures may even date back to the Early Permian.) The Bandanna Formation reaches a maximum thickness of 368 metres (1,207 ft).

Geologic activity separated the entire Bowen Basin from the sea at the start of the Triassic, making the formerly swampy region much drier. The area entered a first period of subsidence sometime near the transition between the Permian and Triassic. The Rewan Formation was deposited in the late Triassic, a time when the rate of subsidence had decreased. On top of this is the Clemantis Group, which ranges from 100 metres (330 ft) thick in the west of the trough to 2,000 metres (6,600 ft) near the middle. Its sediments evidence mud and deposits from rivers. At a time of increasing subsidence at the start of the Middle Triassic, the Moolayember Formation was deposited, reflecting an environment of rivers and lakes.

A shift in geologic activity starting from the late Triassic ended deposition in the entire Bowen Basin. This shift may have removed 1.5 kilometres (0.93 mi) of sediment from the Denison Trough. The trough later became buried around 3 kilometres (1.9 mi) deep, before being uplifted again. It was reburied in the Jurassic or Cretaceous, when the Surat Basin became overlaid on top of parts of the southern Denison Trough. This geologic activity led to high temperatures, with the Aldebaran Sandstone formation perhaps reaching 105 °C (221 °F) in the Triassic and 85 °C (185 °F) in the Cretaceous. The high heat of the Triassic is when coal would have developed from peat swamp deposits. The temperature was likely highest in what is now the trough's east. Uplift during the Cretaceous may have caused much of what would be part of the overlying Surat Basin to erode.

In terms of heat, the rocks were likely exposed to high heat levels during the Early Permian, slow cooling in the late Permian, low heat in the Early Triassic, high heat during the remainder of the Triassic, low heat during the Jurassic and Early Cretaceous, and increasing heat towards the Late Cretaceous, which was likely the time of the highest heat levels.

After this period of formation, in some areas silcrete deposits indicate weathering taking place up until the Oligocene. Volcanic activity from the southwest Buckland Volcanic Province (part of the Great Dividing Range) deposited some material in the late Oligocene. Streams have continued to deposit some material up until and including the Holocene.

== Research and extraction history ==
Details of some wells drilled in the southern Denison Trough by the late 1970s

The first geologic survey of the Permian-Triassic materials that make up the Denison Trough took place in 1926, with a subsequent one in 1930. Many others followed over the next few decades, conducted by various researchers. The Aldebaran Sandstone and Catherine Sandstone formations were named during the 1930 study. The Ingelara Formation was also described at this time, although it was referred to as the "Coral Stage", obtaining its current name only in 1957. The Reids Dome beds were described in 1956, named after the Reids Dome well through which the research was carried out. The Cattle Creek Formation was named in 1957.

The first hydrocarbon exploration in the form of oil drilling took place in the late 1920s, and further attempts continued in the decades following. Shell (Queensland) Development Pty. ltd. began gravity surveys in the Bowen Basin in 1940, although its results remained private. Wide-scale hydrocarbon exploration of the Bowen and Surat basins began after the discovery of the Moonie oil field in 1961, leading to large reserves of hydrocarbons being found.

The Glentulloch gas accumulation from the Aldebaran Sandstone in the south of the trough was discovered in 1961 by Associated Australian Oil Fields. In 1962, reservoirs in the Aldebaran Sandstone and Reids Dome beds were discovered by CSR Ltd in the south, in what became known as the Westgrove structure.

The first seismic survey was carried out in 1959, with many following in subsequent years. The Bureau of Mineral Resources undertook a magnetic survey from 1961 to 1963. They also conducted a gravity survey over the southern Bowen Basin in 1964, which provided clear data that showed the extent of the Denison Trough.

The Arcturus gas accumulation in the east, which was sealed at the top of the Mantuan Formation, was discovered in 1964 by Associated Freney Oil Fields Ltd. Gas was initially found in the Mantuan and Peawaddy Formations, as well as the Catherine Sandstone. In 1991, a drill at the site also found gas in the Aldebaran Sandstone. Also in 1964, Associated Freney Oil Fields Ltd. discovered the Rolleston gas accumulation in the east.

The Peawaddy Formation was named in 1964, the Freitag Formation in 1966, and the Black Alley Shale in 1969.

The Queensland Department of Mines began research drilling in 1970. A 1976 palynological study found that all Permian samples that had so far been taken from the Denison Trough were at least 1% organic carbon, and thus possible hydrocarbon sources.

The Merivale gas accumulation in the west was discovered in 1982 by Associated Australian Resources Ltd. The same year, Associated Australian Resources Ltd. discovered the Yellowbank accumulation 12 kilometres (7.5 mi) north of the Westgrove structure.

Gas discoveries in the Bowen and Surat basins slowed down following the mid-1980s. Although new reserves were discovered in about a fifth of all wells, they were often small. Infrastructure development in the Denison Trough lagged behind other areas of the basins. In 1990, a new state gas pipeline was completed, running from Wallumbilla through the trough, before heading east to terminate at Gladstone. The completion of this pipe unlocked the commercial potential of the trough. (This is now named the Queensland Gas Pipeline.) Oil Company of Australia Ltd constructed two pipelines to complement the development of the state gas pipeline. One in the south ran from Glentulloch to Westgrove, while one in the north ran from Arcturus to Rolleston. Both allowed gas to be transported to Brisbane.

As of 1996 the Reids Dome beds had not been sampled through their entire depth, although the top of the formation was considered well mapped. In the mid-2000s the Queensland and Australian governments jointly drilled twelve wells in the northern part of the trough to investigate the possibility of using the trough for carbon capture and storage.

== See also ==
- Energy in Australia
