= Bituminite =

Finely-ground and macerated organic remains found in bituminous coal

Bituminite is an autochthonous maceral that is a part of the liptinite group in lignite, that occurs in petroleum source rocks originating from organic matter such as algae which has undergone alteration or degradation from natural processes such as burial. It occurs as fine-grained groundmass, laminae or elongated structures that appear as veinlets within horizontal sections of lignite and bituminous coals, and also occurs in sedimentary rocks. Its occurrence in sedimentary rocks is typically found surrounding alginite, and parallel along bedding planes. Bituminite is not considered to be bitumen because its properties are different from most bitumens. It is described to have no definite shape or form when present in bedding and can be identified using different kinds of visible and fluorescent lights. There are three types of bituminite: type I, type II and type III, of which type I is the most common. The presence of bituminite in oil shales, other oil source rocks and some coals plays an important factor when determining potential petroleum-source rocks.

== Physical properties ==
The internal structure of bituminite varies from deposit to deposit. It may be homogeneous, streaky, fluidal or finely granular. These properties of internal structure, however, are only visible when particles are irradiated with blue or violet light.

Bituminite is commonly found in the size and shape of irregular, discoidal particles that are typically 100–200 μm in diameter. When observed under transmitted light with oil immersion, the color of bituminite is orange, reddish to brown. Under reflected light, bituminite is dark brown to dark grey and sometimes black in color. Bituminite has an approximate density of ≈1.2–1.3 g/cm^{3}, which was determined by gradient centrifuging. Bituminite has a very low polishing hardness. It usually smears during the polishing process because it is unconsolidated and very soft.

== Occurrence ==
Bituminite is found in anoxic to anoxic lacustrine and marine environments commonly associated with other maceral minerals such as alginite and liptodetrinite. The organic material undergoes diagenesis, forming an amorphous matrix. Framboidal pyrite is a common feature associated with bituminite. This is caused by bacterial reworking of the digestible organic matter. Due to the reworking of organic matter the particles/grains of bituminite often appear diffuse and blurred. Though grains of bituminite are often too blurred to distinguish, its optical properties widely vary, and are therefore used to determine the bituminite type.

It is very common to have all three types of bituminite in organic-rich sedimentary rocks, however, the modal percentage of bituminite type varies. Typically type I bituminite is found to be much larger than other types and exude a negative alteration when irradiated with blue light. Type II is determined by its yellowish or reddish-brown fluorescence and its occasional oil expulsions when irradiated. Type III, the rarest kind of bituminite, appears dark grey under a reflected white light, however, lacks fluorescence. It is also distinguished by the fine granular structure and its association with faunal relics.

== History ==
Bituminite was a general term given to rocks which are rich in bitumen. The term was also used informally to describe irregularly shaped macerals until 1975 when the ICCP clearly defined the term.

== Applications and uses ==
Bituminite is the main source for low-temperature coal tar, which is used in industry, medicine and construction. The value of bituminite increases with grade. At high grade, i.e. high maturity, bituminite has high hydrogen to carbon content. A high hydrogen/carbon ratio bituminite indicates a good hydrocarbon source. However, low grades of bituminite vary depending on type, meaning that there is variable hydrogen/carbon ratios.

Bituminite can also be used as potential indicators in the petroleum industry. Research has shown that type I bituminite in modes upwards of 10% of the total organic matter, is indicative of a potential petroleum-source rock.
