= Funginite =

Coal mineral based on fossilized fungi

Funginite is a maceral, a component, organic in origin, of coal or oil shale, exhibiting several different physical properties and characteristics under particular conditions; its dimensions are based upon its source and place of discovery. Furthermore, it is primarily part of a group of macerals that naturally occur in rocks containing mostly carbon constituents, specifically coal. Due to its nature, research into the chemical structure and formula of funginite is considered limited and lacking. According to Chen et al. referencing ICCP, 2001 (International Committee for Coal and Organic Petrology), alongside the maceral secretinite, they "are both macerals of the inertinite group, which is more commonly known as fossilized charcoal, and were previously jointly classified as the maceral sclerotinite". In the scientific community, the discernment between the two does not remain entirely clear, but there are slight particular and specific differences in regards to the composition between both. It is also the product of fungal development on these carbon-rich sedimentary rocks.

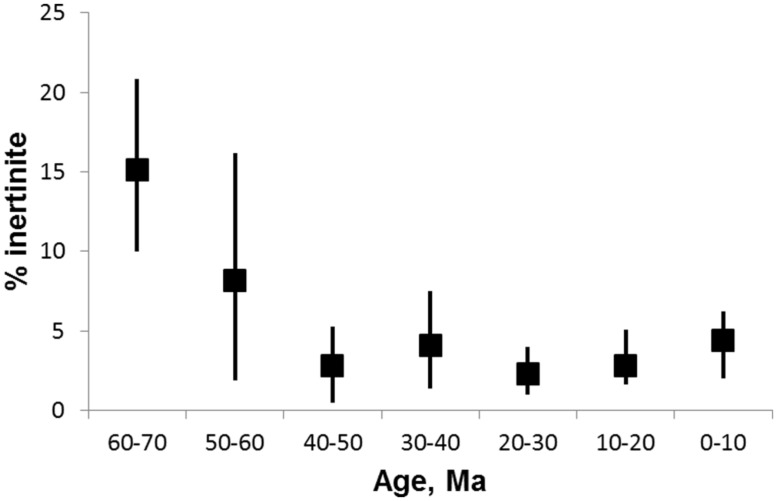
"Amount of inertinite presence based on geological time scale of formation resulting from fires"

Resulting from its fossilized roots composed of fungal spores and similar material, funginite quantity as an inertinite has a direct correlation to instances of natural wildfires that occurred during the Cenozoic Era approximately 60 million years ago to the present (see chart), ranging from the Paleogene through to the Quaternary.

== Etymology ==
The term "funginite" is based on the word "fungus" that has its roots in Latin, and evolved through to late middle English, while its suffix "-ite" pertains to mineralogical nomenclature. There is speculation that it may have also been derived from ancient Greek roots, utilizing the word for "sponge" instead.

== Properties ==
Funginite's chemical composition consists primarily of carbon and hydrogen, and, compared to other macerals in the same group of inertinites, its theoretical carbon-to-oxygen ratio was found to be low. The maceral was also found to have a low molecular reaction characteristic based on the Arrhenius equation due to its 'A' factor value, also known as its pre-exponential factor, making funginite nonreactive in comparison to other macerals subjected to the same amount of activation energy or kinetic energy in a system.

In terms of its official classification and designation, funginite is a part of the teloinertinite subgroup, which is part of the inertinite group of macerals.

Funginite also contains higher amounts of carbon and lower amounts of hydrogen than its maceral counterparts, due to the nature of inertinites, as they generally "contain higher proportions of elemental-carbon and lower proportions of elemental-hydrogen compared to vitrinites and liptinites".

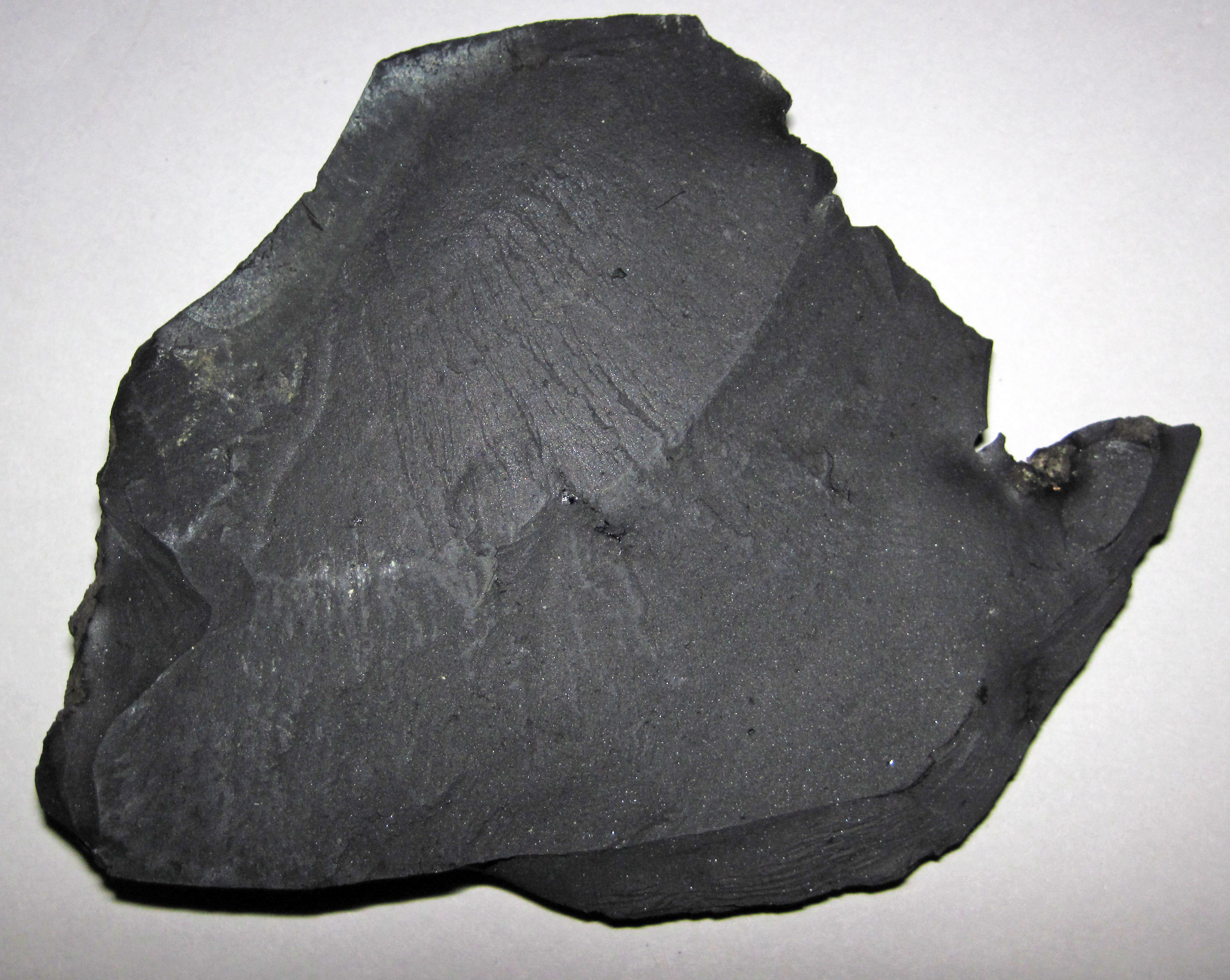
"Coal composed of the three main maceral groups: ~22% vitrinite, ~47% liptinite, and ~31% inertinite"

=== Reflectance and fluorescence ===
Among the other maceral categories, funginite can also be classified under huminite and/or vitrinite. Funginite, along with other macerals that fall in the same family, such as cutinite and sporinite, according to one study, exhibits an average reflectance value of 0.81%, with a standard deviation of 0.05. The physical characteristics of the "fungal bodies" not only fluctuate and vary, but also determine the constitution of the spores by causing them to be identified as either single celled or multi-celled by nature. This was done alongside resinite, and the four coal samples had several trials conducted. The results indicated that funginite was "nonfluorescent and [presented] the highest reflectance value", based on a study conducted by the ICCP.

=== Formation ===
Funginite is primarily found in coal due to the nature of its formation process, which involves a fungal spore or body contaminating resin within trees, and undergoing the heat and pressure process of transformation into coal and other carbon-rich substances, which is best summarized as when a "fungus enters a wound in the tree or in the process of rotting the wood or bark can be encapsulated through the release of a resin.", which is known as the process of cicatrization. Other methods of fungi being incorporated into resin for the potential formation of funginite may also involve insects or other similar organisms that are carrying the fungal matter to be trapped or even purposefully store said material into the resin, unlike the third main possible method that is a result of the aforementioned fungi in question using the resin as sustenance

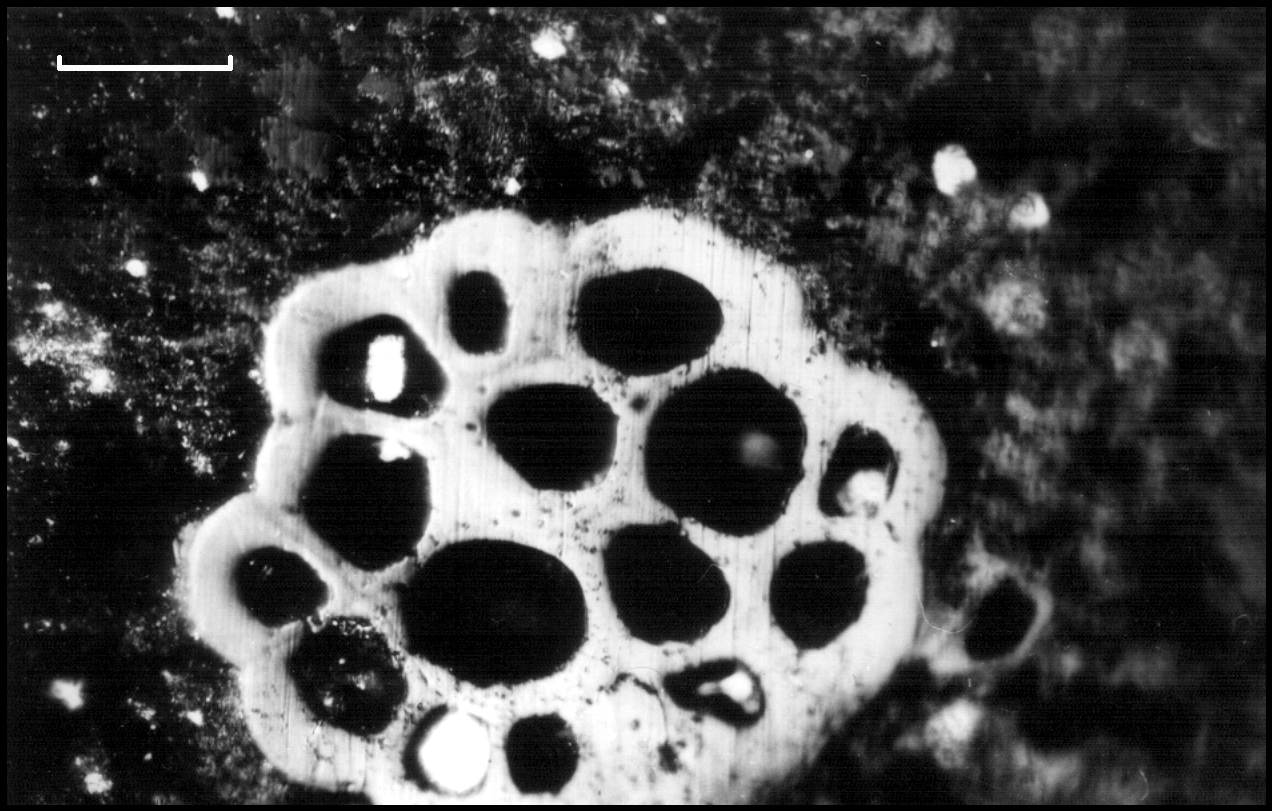
"A micrograph of funginite"

Funginite's development, and more broadly, inertinite in general, occurs in forests due to the nature of its properties and characteristics. According to Mastalerz et al. 2011, of the primary groups of macerals, inertinites with a high level of fluorescence and reflectance have these particular traits attributed to the temperature of the fires in which they are formed under, as simply put, their "reflectance is directly related to the fire temperature". Furthermore, given the nature of macerals in general, and how they are based on formerly living organisms, this generally results in higher concentrations of funginite being found in such locations when coal and charcoal are inspected closely at these sites. Funginite is based on fungal spores, and the density of fungal material being present in forests is considered abundantly higher than in other common locations for inertinites.

The research undertaken into funginite, as well as other similar inertinites, may provide clues to understanding the events of natural spontaneous combustion, given the requirements for that event to occur.

== Use ==
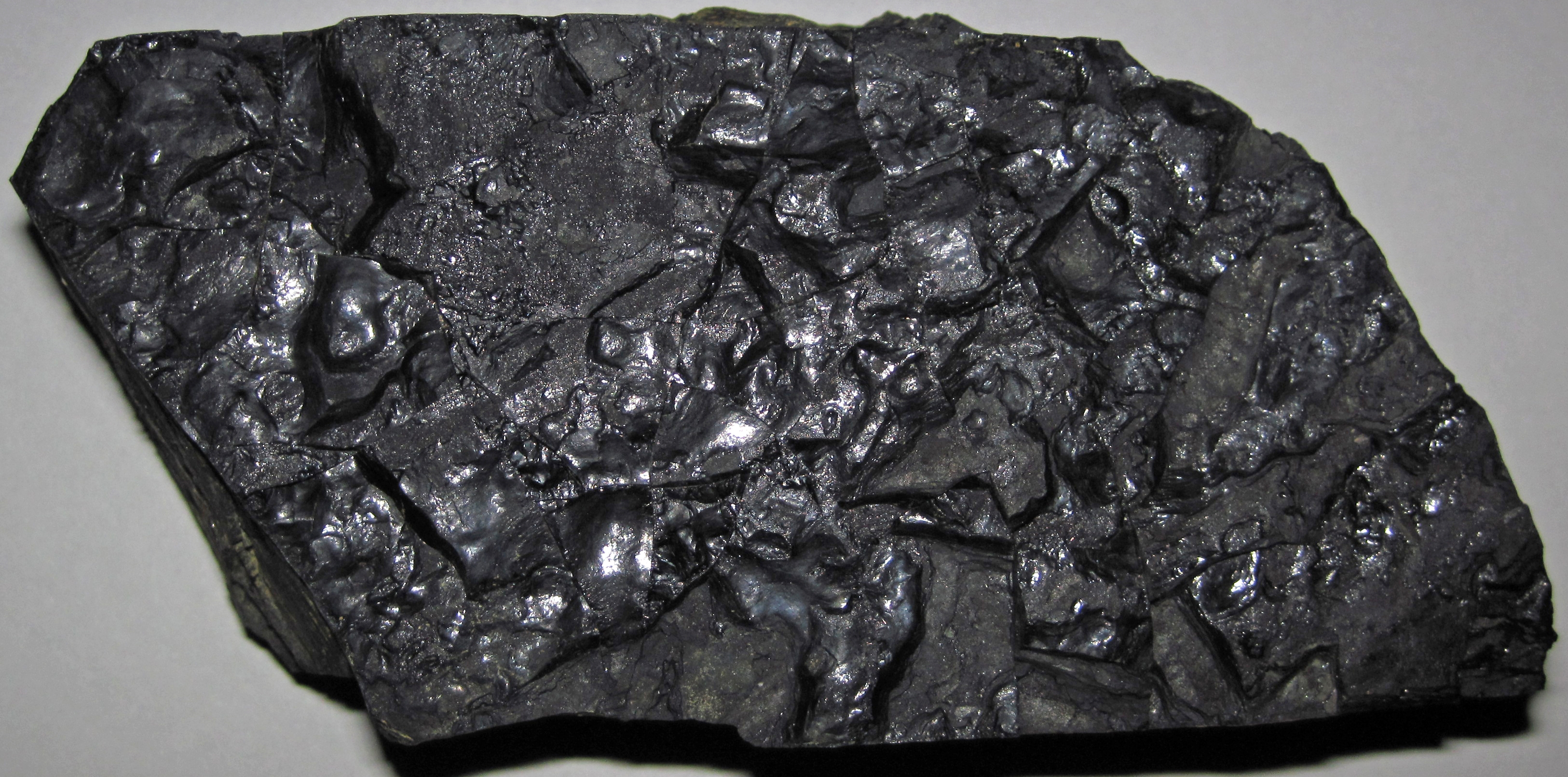
"Bituminous coal composed of macerals, demonstrating variance between different maceral composition amongst different types of coal"

As of 2010, there has not been sufficient research conducted on the impact of funginite on petrology, and this includes other inertinites and macerals in general. It is also assumed that by understanding the constitution of common and uncommon variants and types of coal alike, locating and identifying deposits rich in a particular kind of coal may potentially be made easier, as well as the burning characteristics in the scope of petrology and petrochemical fields.

Increased studies into funginite as a constituent of coal may also assist in the identification and selection of metallurgical coal, as it is a fundamental aspect of producing coke, which is a source of fuel for metallurgical works such as steel production.

== Discovery ==
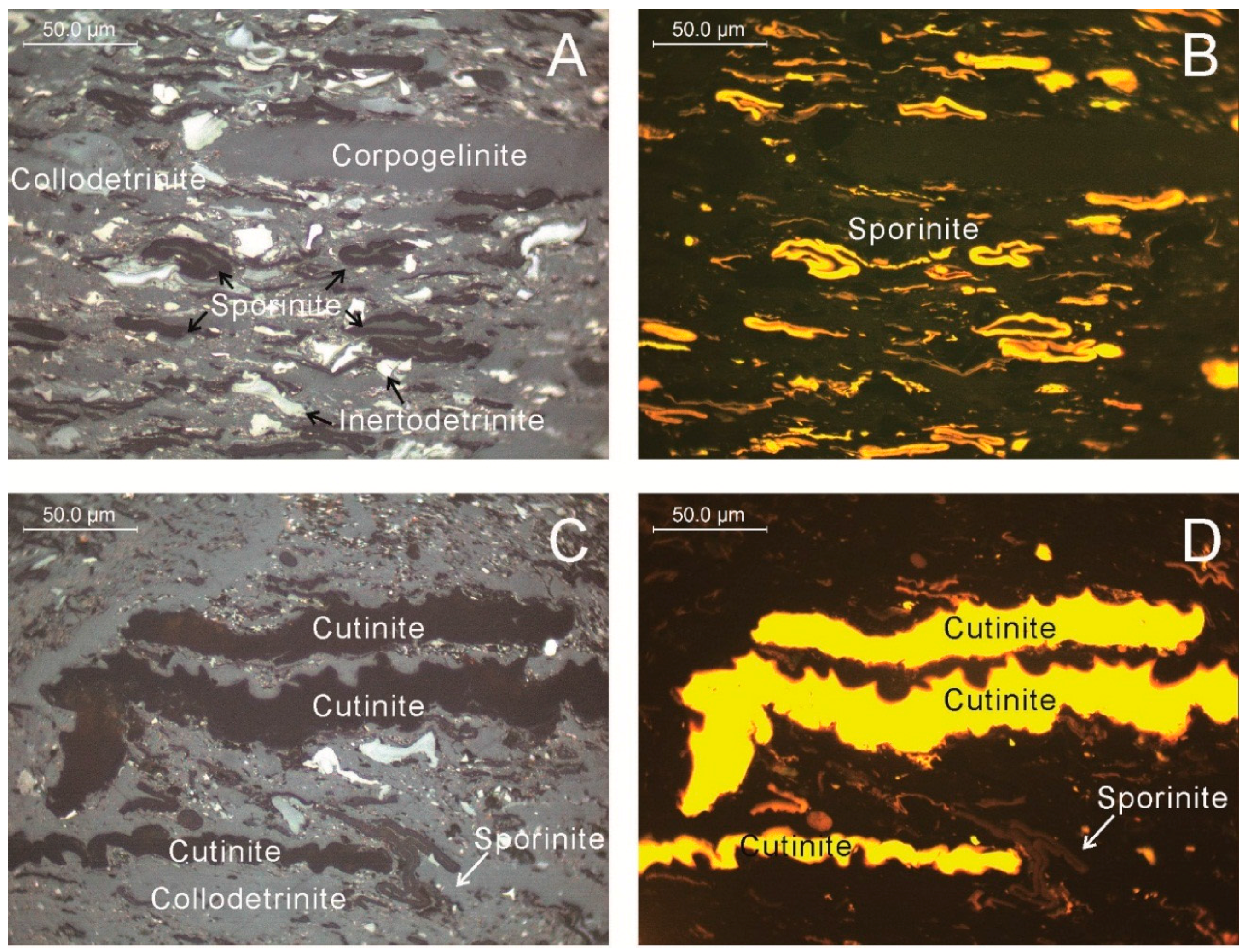
"Various macerals under fluorescent light exhibit varying degrees of reflectance"

According to Hower et al. referencing Jeffrey and Chrysler, 1906, Berkeley, 1848, and Thomas, 1848, fungal constituents and matter are not "new" in the realm of coal and its formation, and the traces of fungal substances in resin, fossilized or not, predate that discovery even further. Currently, funginite, along with other macerals in general, is being researched and identified using micro FTIR (Fourier-transform infrared spectroscopy) mapping, which enables further identification of fluorescence and the organic chemical composition. Further research is being done in regard to small X-ray angle scattering and small angle neutron scattering, SAXS and SANS respectively, as means of "determining the porosity, pore size distribution and internal specific surface area in coals," which would allow for extended research to be conducted into macerals, inertinites, and more specifically, funginite.

== See also ==
- Basin modelling
- Coal
- Maceral
  - Exinite
  - Liptinite
  - Vitrinite
- Fossil fuels
- Geology
