= Coal analysis =

Measurement of properties of coal

Coal analysis techniques are specific analytical methods designed to measure the particular physical and chemical properties of coals. These methods are used primarily to determine the suitability of coal for coking, power generation or for iron ore smelting in the manufacture of steel.

== Chemical properties of coal ==
Coal comes in four main types or ranks: lignite or brown coal, bituminous coal or black coal, anthracite and graphite. Each type of coal has a certain set of physical parameters which are mostly controlled by moisture, volatile content (in terms of aliphatic or aromatic hydrocarbons) and carbon content.

=== Moisture ===
Moisture is an important property of coal, as all coals are mined wet. Groundwater and other extraneous moisture is known as adventitious moisture and is readily evaporated. Moisture held within the coal itself is known as inherent moisture and is analysed quantitatively. Moisture may occur in four possible forms within coal:

- Surface moisture: water held on the surface of coal particles or macerals
- Hygroscopic moisture: water held by capillary action within the microfractures of the coal
- Decomposition moisture: water held within the coal's decomposed organic compounds
- Mineral moisture: water which comprises part of the crystal structure of hydrous silicates such as clays

Total moisture is analysed by loss of mass between an untreated sample and the sample once analysed. This is achieved by any of the following methods;

1. Heating the coal with toluene
2. Drying in a minimum free-space oven at 150 °C (302 °F) within a nitrogen atmosphere
3. Drying in air at 100 to 105 °C (212 to 221 °F) and relative loss of mass determined

Methods 1 and 2 are suitable with low-rank coals, but method 3 is only suitable for high-rank coals as free air drying low-rank coals may promote oxidation. Inherent moisture is analysed similarly, though it may be done in a vacuum.

=== Volatile matter ===
Volatile matter in coal refers to the components of coal, except for moisture, which are liberated at high temperature in the absence of air. This is usually a mixture of short- and long-chain hydrocarbons, aromatic hydrocarbons and some sulfur. Volatile matter also evaluate the adsorption application of an activated carbon. The volatile matter of coal is determined under rigidly controlled standards. In Australian and British laboratories this involves heating the coal sample to 900 ± 5 °C (1650 ±10 °F) for 7 min. Also as the rank of coal increases the volatile matter decreases (AMK).

=== Ash ===
Ash content of coal is the non-combustible residue left after coal is burnt. It represents the bulk mineral matter after carbon, oxygen, sulfur and water (including from clays) has been driven off during combustion. Analysis is fairly straightforward, with the coal thoroughly burnt and the ash material expressed as a percentage of the original weight. It can also give an indication about the quality of coal. Ash content may be determined as air dried basis and on oven dried basis. The main difference between the two is that the latter is determined after expelling the moisture content in the sample of coal.

=== Fixed carbon ===
The fixed carbon content of the coal is the carbon found in the material which is left after volatile materials are driven off. This differs from the ultimate carbon content of the coal because some carbon is lost in hydrocarbons with the volatiles. Fixed carbon is used as an estimate of the amount of coke that will be yielded from a sample of coal. Fixed carbon is determined by removing the mass of volatiles determined by the volatility test, above, from the original mass of the coal sample.

== Physical and mechanical properties ==
=== Relative density ===
Relative density or specific gravity of the coal depends on the rank of the coal and degree of mineral impurity. Knowledge of the density of each coal play is necessary to determine the properties of composites and blends. The density of the coal seam is necessary for conversion of resources into reserves.

Relative density is normally determined by the loss of a sample's weight in water. This is best achieved using finely ground coal, as bulk samples are quite porous. To determine in-place coal tonnages however, it is important to preserve the void space when measuring the specific gravity.

=== Particle size distribution ===
The particle size distribution of milled coal depends partly on the rank of the coal, which determines its brittleness, and on the handling, crushing and milling it has undergone. Generally coal is utilised in furnaces and coking ovens at a certain size, so the crushability of the coal must be determined and its behaviour quantified. It is necessary to know these data before coal is mined, so that suitable crushing machinery can be designed to optimise the particle size for transport and use.

=== Float-sink test ===
Coal plies and particles have different relative densities, determined by vitrinite content, rank, ash value/mineral content and porosity. Coal is usually washed by passing it over a bath of liquid of known density. This removes high-ash value particle and increases the saleability of the coal as well as its energy content per unit volume. Thus, coals must be subjected to a float-sink test in the laboratory, which will determine the optimum particle size for washing, the density of the wash liquid required to remove the maximum ash value with the minimum work.

Float-Sink testing is achieved on crushed and pulverised coal in a process similar to metallurgical testing on metallic ore.

=== Abrasion testing ===
Abrasion is the property of the coal which describes its propensity and ability to wear away machinery and undergo autonomous grinding. While carbonaceous matter in coal is relatively soft, quartz and other mineral constituents in coal are quite abrasive. This is tested in a calibrated mill, containing four blades of known mass. The coal is agitated in the mill for 12,000 revolutions at a rate of 1,500 revolutions per minute.(I.E 1500 revolution for 8 min.) The abrasion index is determined by measuring the loss of mass of the four metal blades.

== Special combustion tests ==
=== Specific energy ===
Aside from physical or chemical analyses to determine the handling and pollutant profile of a coal, the energy output of a coal is determined using a bomb calorimeter which measures the specific energy output of a coal during complete combustion. This is required particularly for coals used in steam generation.

=== Ash fusion test ===
The behaviour of the coal's ash residue at high temperature is a critical factor in selecting coals for steam power generation. Most furnaces are designed to remove ash as a powdery residue. Coal which has ash that fuses into a hard glassy slag known as clinker is usually unsatisfactory in furnaces as it requires cleaning. However, furnaces can be designed to handle the clinker, generally by removing it as a molten liquid.

Ash fusion temperatures are determined by viewing a moulded specimen of the coal ash through an observation window in a high-temperature furnace. The ash, in the form of a cone, pyramid or cube, is heated steadily past 1000 °C to as high a temperature as possible, preferably 1,600 °C (2,910 °F). The following temperatures are recorded;

- Deformation temperature: This is reached when the corners of the mould first become rounded.
- Softening (sphere) temperature: This is reached when the top of the mould takes on a spherical shape.
- Hemisphere temperature: This is reached when the entire mould takes on a hemisphere shape.
- Flow (fluid) temperature: This is reached when the molten ash collapses to a flattened button on the furnace floor.

=== Crucible swelling index (free swelling index) ===
The simplest test to evaluate whether a coal is suitable for production of coke is the free swelling index test. This involves heating a small sample of coal in a standardised crucible to around 800 degrees Celsius (1500 °F).
After heating for a specified time, or until all volatiles are driven off, a small coke button remains in the crucible. The cross sectional profile of this coke button compared to a set of standardised profiles determines the Free Swelling Index.

== Coal classification by rank ==
Several international standards classify coals by their rank, where increasing rank corresponds to coal with a higher carbon content. The rank of coal is correlated with its geologic history, as described in Hilt's law.

In the ASTM system, any coal with more than 69% fixed carbon is classified by its content of carbon and volatiles. Coal with less than 69% fixed carbon is classified by its heating value. Volatiles and carbon are on a dry mineral free base; heating value is based on the moisture content as mined, but without any free water.

The ISO also has a coal ranking system, though its subdivisions do not align with the ASTM standard.

ASTM Coal Classification
| Class | Group | Fixed Carbon % Dry, mineral free | Volatile Matter % Dry, mineral free | Heating Value MJ/kg Moist, mineral free |
|---|---|---|---|---|
| Anthracite | Meta Anthracite | >98 | <2 | |
| Anthracite | Anthracite | 92–98 | 2–8 | |
| Anthracite | Semi Anthracite | 86–92 | 8–14 | |
| Bituminous | Low Volatile | 78–86 | 14–22 | |
| Bituminous | Medium Volatile | 69–78 | 22–31 | |
| Bituminous | High Volatile A | <69 | >31 | >32.6 |
| Bituminous | High Volatile B | | | 30.2–32.6 |
| Bituminous | High Volatile C | | | 26.7–30.2 |
| Subbituminous | Subbituminous A | | | 24.4–26.7 |
| Subbituminous | Subbituminous B | | | 22.1–24.4 |
| Subbituminous | Subbituminous C | | | 19.3–22.1 |
| Lignite | Lignite A | | | 14.7–19.3 |
| Lignite | Lignite B | | | <14.7 |
