= Inertinite =

Inertinites are a group of partially oxidized organic (mainly plant) materials or fossilized charcoals, all sharing the characteristic that they typically are inert (i.e., not altered) when heated in the absence of oxygen. Inertinite is a common maceral in most types of coal. The main inertinite submacerals are fusinite, semifusinite, micrinite, macrinite, and funginite, with semifusinite being the most common. From the perspective of coal combustion, inertinite can be burned to yield heat but does not yield significant volatile fractions during coking.

Inertinite is also found as tiny flakes within sedimentary rocks. The presence of inertinite in this context is significant in the geological record, as it signifies that wildfires may have occurred at the time that the host sediment was deposited. It can also be an indication of oxidation due to atmospheric exposure or fungal decomposition during deposition.

The optical properties of semifusinite are very similar to those of vitrinite. They differ in that semifusinite displays a folded texture compared to vitrinite, which generally maintains its composed structure. Inertinites also display higher reflectance than vitrinite, except when approaching an anthracitic or graphite state.

Biochar, produced by pyrolysis at temperatures over 600°C, resembles inertinite.
