= Bituminous coal =

Collective term for higher-quality coal

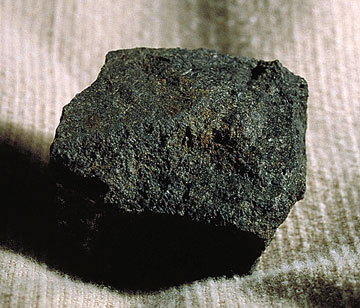
Bituminous coal

Various products manufactured from bituminous coal

Bituminous coal, or black coal, is a type of coal containing a tar-like substance called bitumen or asphalt. Its coloration can be black or sometimes dark brown; often there are well-defined bands of bright and dull material within the seams. It is typically hard but friable. Its quality is ranked higher than lignite and sub-bituminous coal, but lesser than anthracite. It is the most abundant rank of coal, with deposits found around the world, often in rocks of Carboniferous age. Bituminous coal is formed from sub-bituminous coal that is buried deeply enough to be heated to 85 °C (185 °F) or higher.

Bituminous coal is used primarily for electrical power generation and in the steel industry. Bituminous coal suitable for smelting iron (coking coal or metallurgical coal) must be low in sulfur and phosphorus. It commands a higher price than other grades of bituminous coal (thermal coal) used for heating and power generation.

Within the coal mining industry, this type of coal is known for releasing the largest amounts of firedamp, a dangerous mixture of gases that can cause underground explosions. Extraction of bituminous coal demands the highest safety procedures involving attentive gas monitoring, good ventilation and vigilant site management.

== Properties ==
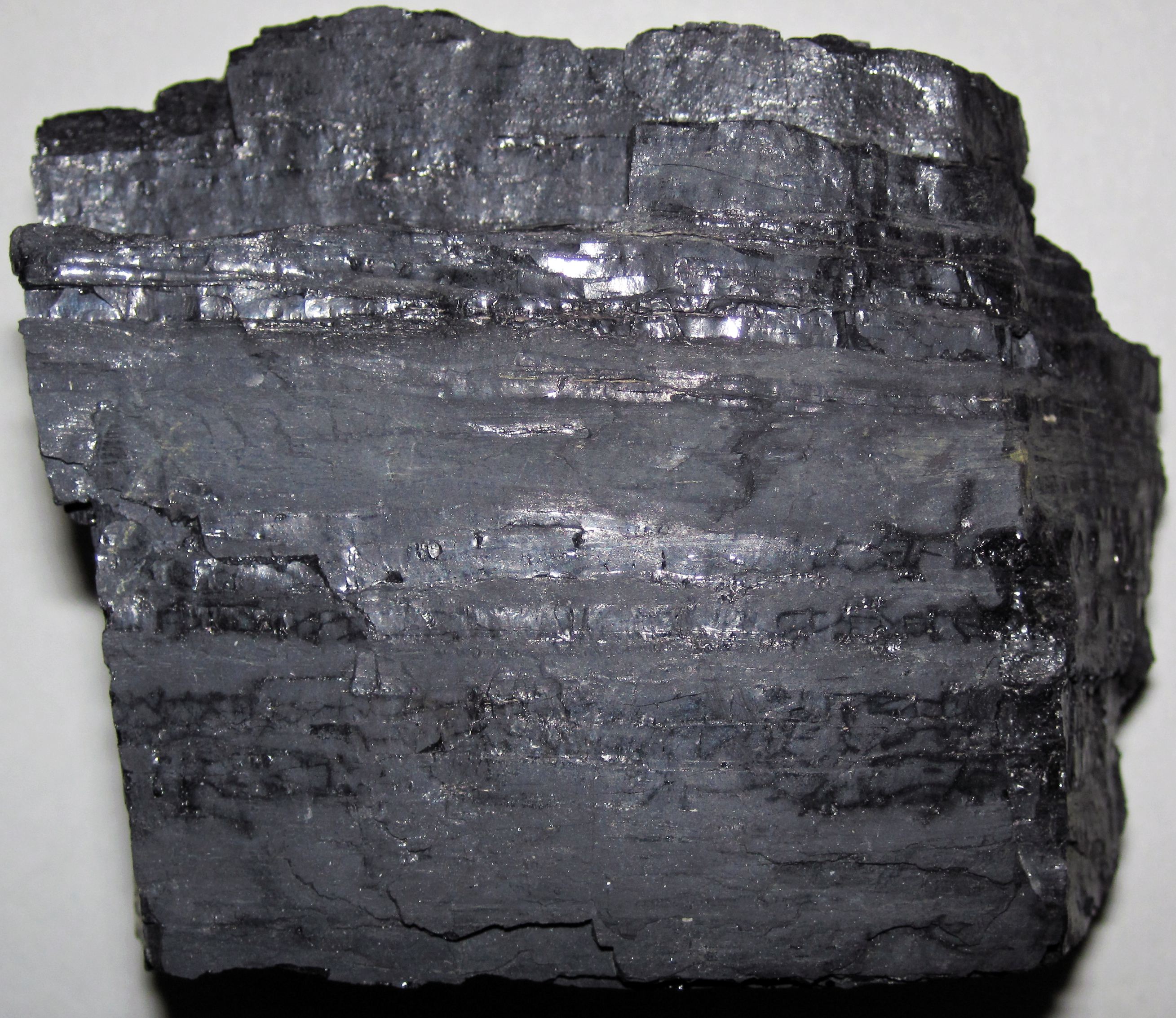
Bituminous coal (Pikeville Formation, Middle Pennsylvanian, Kentucky, USA)

Bituminous coal is a particular rank of coal, as determined by the amount and type of carbon present in the coal and the amount of energy it can produce when burned. It is higher in rank than sub-bituminous coal but lower in rank than anthracite. Bituminous coal is the most abundant rank of coal.

Coal rank is based on several characteristics of the coal. The fixed carbon content refers to the percentage of the coal that is neither moisture, nor ash, nor volatile matter. When evaluated on a dry, mineral-matter-free basis, the fixed carbon content is the fraction of the coal that is not volatile organic matter. An agglomerating coal is a coal that softens when heated, forming a hard, gray, porous coke that resists crushing. Vitrinite reflectance is a measure of how reflective a polished surface of an average particle of vitrinite in the coal is. It is determined by how much of the carbon has condensed to an aromatic form from the heat and pressure of deep burial.

In the United States, bituminous coal is defined as agglomerating coal yielding at least 10,500 Btu/lb (24,400 kJ/kg) of energy on combustion (on a moist, mineral-matter-free basis), with a fixed carbon content less than 86% (on a dry, mineral-matter-free basis.) Coal with a higher fixed carbon content is classified as anthracite, while agglomerating coal yielding less than 10,500 Btu/lb (24,400 kJ/kg) or nonagglomerating coal yielding less than 11,500 Btu/lb (26,700 kJ/kg) is classified as sub-bituminous coal. In the international market, bituminous coal is defined as coal with a vitrinite reflectance between 0.5 and 1.9. Vitrinite reflectance is also routinely measured for U.S. coal as a check on its rank classification

Bituminous coal is dark brown to black, hard, but friable. It is commonly composed of thin bands of alternating bright and dull material. Though bituminous coal varies in its chemical composition, a typical composition is about 84.4% carbon, 5.4% hydrogen, 6.7% oxygen, 1.7% nitrogen, and 1.8% sulfur, on a weight basis. Its bank density (the density of a coal seam prior to breaking up during mining) is about 1346 kg/m^{3} (84 lb/ft^{3}) while the bulk density of extracted coal is up to 833 kg/m^{3} (52 lb/ft^{3}). Bituminous coal characteristically burns with a smoky flame and softens and swells during combustion. It gets its name from this tendency to form a softened, sticky mass when heated, which reflects the presence of bitumen (mineral tar) in the coal.

Though almost all agglomerating coal is of bituminous rank, some bituminous coal is not agglomerating. Non-agglomerating bituminous coal includes cannel coal and boghead coal. These are nonbanded and nonreflective, and break with a conchoidal fracture. Both are sapropelic, in contrast with most bituminous coal, which is humic (composed of decayed woody tissue of plants). Cannel coal is composed mostly of plant spores, while boghead coal is composed mostly of nonspore algal remains.

=== Subranks ===
In the United States, bituminous coal is further divided into subranks based on its heating value and fixed carbon content.

ASTM Bituminous Coal Classification
| Class | Group | Fixed Carbon % Dry, mineral free | Volatile Matter % Dry, mineral free | Heating Value MJ/kg Moist, mineral free |
|---|---|---|---|---|
| Bituminous | Low Volatile | 78–86 | 14–22 | |
| Bituminous | Medium Volatile | 69–78 | 22–31 | |
| Bituminous | High Volatile A | <69 | >31 | >32.6 |
| Bituminous | High Volatile B | | | 30.2–32.6 |
| Bituminous | High Volatile C | | | 26.7–30.2 |

Thus bituminous coal is divided into high-, medium-, and low-volatile categories based on fixed carbon content, and high-volatile bituminous coal is further subdivided by energy content.

ISO classification of bituminous coal is based on vitrinite reflectance. This classification divides medium rank coal (approximately equivalent to bituminous coal) into four subranks. In order of increasing rank, these are:

- Medium D: Vitrinite reflectance of 0.5 to 0.6. Corresponds approximately to ASTM high volatile C bituminous or sub-bituminous A.
- Medium C: Vitrinite reflectance of 0.6 to 1.0. Corresponds approximately to ASTM high volatile C to high volatile B bituminous.
- Medium B : Vitrinite reflectance of 1.0 to 1.4. Corresponds approximately to ASTM high volatile A to medium volatile bituminous.
- Medium A: Vitrinite reflectance of 1.4 to 2.0. Corresponds approximately to ASTM low volatile bituminous.

== Uses ==
Bituminous coal is used primarily for electrical power generation and in the manufacture of steel.

=== Coking coal ===
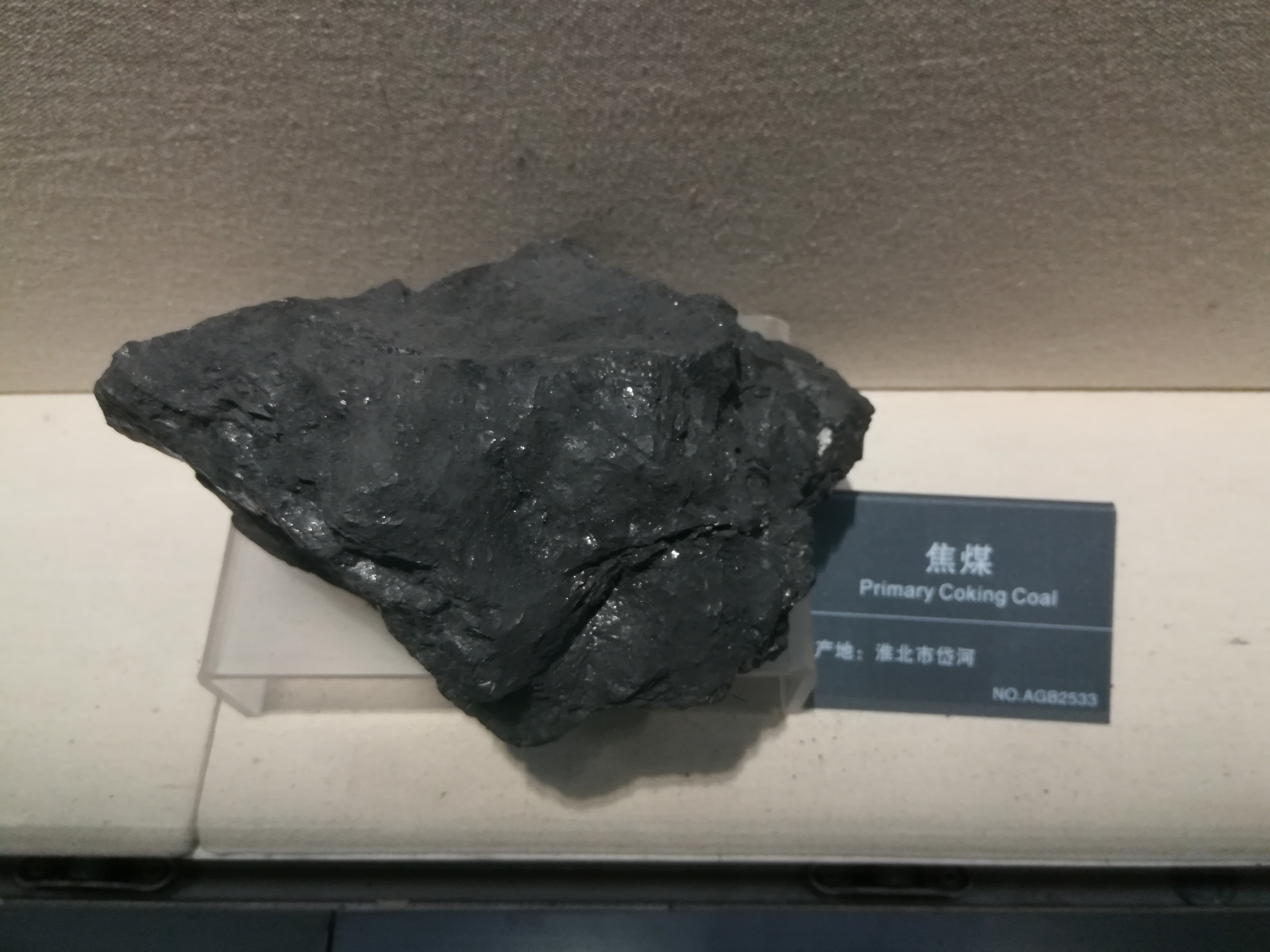
Primary coking coal

Coking coal (metallurgical coal or "met coal") is used in the manufacture of steel. A good coking coal must have excellent agglomeration properties, a high carbon content, and a low content of sulfur, phosphorus, and ash. The best unblended coking coal is high quality medium-volatile bituminous coal. However, since single coals with all the necessary properties are scarce, coking coal is usually a blend of high-volatile bituminous coal with lesser amounts of medium- and low-volatile bituminous coal.

Smithing coal is bituminous coal of the highest quality, as free of ash and sulfur as possible, used to manufacture coke for use by blacksmiths.

Coking coal commands a higher price than coal used for energy production. As of 2020, coking coal in the U.S. sold for about $127/short ton, compared with $50.05/short ton for bituminous coal generally. The cost of coking coal is about 3.5 times as high as the cost of coal used for electrical power (which includes lower ranks of coal, such sub-bituminous coal and lignite, as well as noncoking bituminous coal.)

=== Thermal coal ===
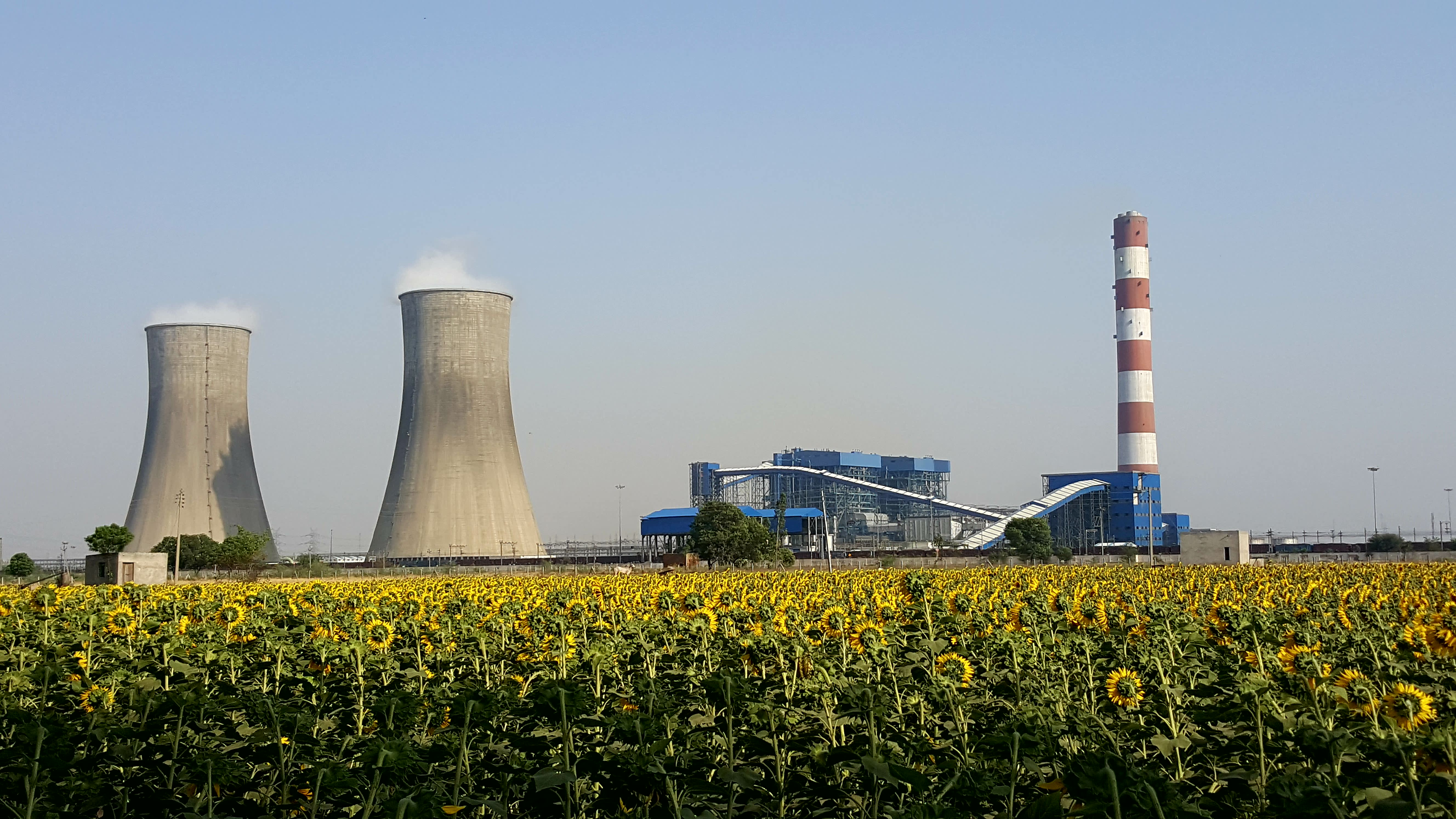
Rajpura Thermal Power Plant

Bituminous coal which lacks the qualities required for use as metallurgical coal is graded as thermal coal. This is used primarily for electrical power generation. The ideal thermal coal is easily ignited but has a high heat content.

=== Activated carbon ===
Bituminous coal is used for the production of activated carbon. The coal is first coked, removing volatiles, then steam treated to activate it. Chemical processes for activating coke produced from bituminous coal have also been investigated.

== Origin ==
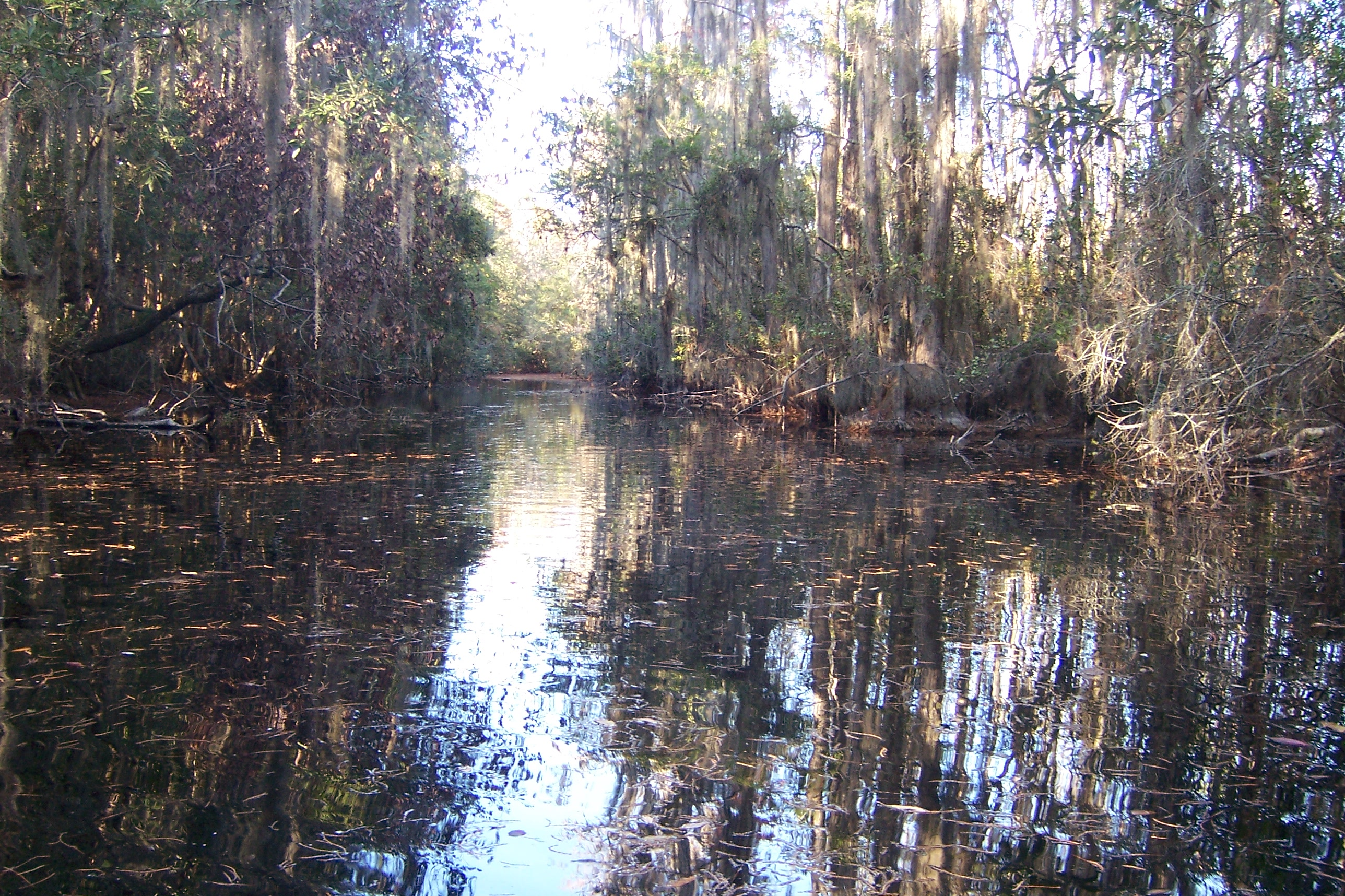
Okefenokee Swamp, a modern peat-forming swamp

Like other ranks of coal, bituminous coal forms from thick accumulations of dead plant material that are buried faster than they can decay. This usually takes place in peat bogs, where falling plant debris is submerged in standing water. The stagnant water excludes oxygen, creates an acidic environment, and slows decay. The dead plant material is converted to peat.

Peat is mostly a mixture of cellulose, hemicellulose, and lignin that originally made up the woody tissue of the plants. Lignin has a weight composition of about 54% carbon, 6% hydrogen, and 30% oxygen, while cellulose has a weight composition of about 44% carbon, 6% hydrogen, and 49% oxygen. Bituminous coal has a composition of about 84.4% carbon, 5.4% hydrogen, 6.7% oxygen, 1.7% nitrogen, and 1.8% sulfur, on a weight basis. This implies that chemical processes during coalification remove most of the oxygen and much of the hydrogen, leaving carbon, a process called carbonization.

During coalification, the maturing coal increases in carbon content, decreases in hydrogen and volatiles, increases in its heating value, and becomes darker and more lustrous. Chemical changes include dehydration (which removes oxygen and hydrogen as water), decarboxylation (which removes oxygen as carbon dioxide), and demethanation (which removes hydrogen as methane). By the time the coal reaches bituminous rank, most dehydration and decarboxylation has already taken place, and maturation of bituminous coal is characterized by demethanation. During coalification at bituminous rank, coal approaches its maximum heating value and begins to lose most of its volatile content.

As carbonization proceeds, aliphatic compounds (carbon compounds characterized by chains of carbon atoms) are replaced by aromatic compounds (carbon compounds characterized by rings of carbon atoms) and aromatic rings begin to fuse into polyaromatic compounds (linked rings of carbon atoms). The structure increasingly resembles graphene, the structural element of graphite. This is accompanied by an increase in vitrinite reflectance, used to assess coal rank.

During coalification, the pressure of burial reduces the volume of the original peat by a factor of 30 as it is converted to coal. However, the increase in rank of maturing coal mostly reflects the maximum temperature the coal reaches. Neither the maximum pressure, nor the nature of the original plant material, nor the length of burial is nearly as important. The temperature range for maturation of bituminous coal is from 85 to 235 °C (185 to 455 °F). The bitumen that characterizes bituminous coal forms under approximately the same conditions at which petroleum is formed in petroleum source rocks. Bituminization is accompanied by peak methane generation in medium to low volatile bituminous coal. This makes these bituminous coals "gassy" and precautions must be taken against methane explosions. If the coal reaches temperatures above about 235 °C (455 °F), bitumen breaks down (debituminization) and the coal matures to anthracite.

== Occurrence and production ==
Coal deposits are widely distributed worldwide, and range in age from the Devonian (about 360 to 420 million years ago) to Neogene deposits just a few million years old. However, 90% of all coal beds were deposited in the Carboniferous and Permian periods, which represent just 2% of the Earth's geologic history. Vast deposits of coal formed in wetlands—called coal forests—that covered much of the Earth's tropical land areas during the late Carboniferous (Pennsylvanian) and Permian times. Bituminous coal is predominantly Carboniferous in age.

Most bituminous coal in the United States is between 100 and 300 million years old. Vast deposits of bituminous coal of Pennsylvanian age is found in the Appalachian and Interior Provinces of North America. Mining is done via both surface and underground mines. Historically, the many seams scattered over rugged terrain in the Appalachians have been conducive to mining by small companies, while the great extent and gentle dip of beds further west favors very large-scale operations. The Appalachian coal is notably low in sulfur and is often of metallurgical grade, while the Interior Province coal is much higher in sulfur.

The belt of Carboniferous coal fields extends into central Europe, and much of this is bituminous coal. Bituminous coal fields are found in Poland and the Czech Republic, and the Polish deposits are one of the most important of that nation's natural resources. The Czech deposits have been exploited since prehistoric times. The European deposits include the Coal Measures of Britain, which account for most of Britain's coal production and which are mostly bituminous coal. Other significant bituminous coal deposits are found through much of Europe, including France, Germany, and northern Italy.

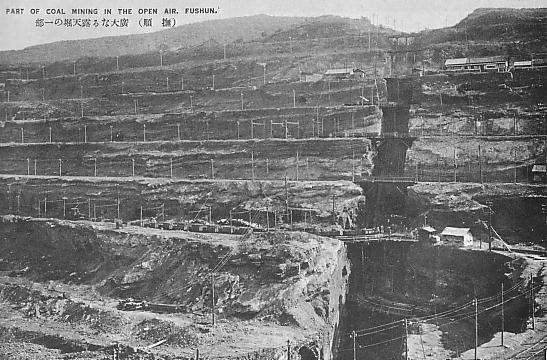
Fushun coal mine, Liaoning, China

Coal deposition was interrupted by the Permian-Triassic extinction event, but resumed later in the Middle Triassic. Extensive bituminous coal deposits of Permian age are found in Siberia, east Asia, and Australia. These include the Minusinsky coal basin in Siberia, the Queensland, Bowen, and Sydney Basins in Australia, and the extensive bituminous coal reserves of China.

A second peak in coal deposition began in the Cretaceous, though most of this is lower rank coal rather than bituminous. In the United States, Cretaceous bituminous coals occur in Wyoming, Colorado and New Mexico. In Canada, the Western Canada Sedimentary Basin of Alberta and British Columbia hosts major deposits of bituminous coal that formed in swamps along the western margin of the Western Interior Seaway. They range in age from latest Jurassic or earliest Cretaceous in the Mist Mountain Formation, to Late Cretaceous in the Gates Formation. The Intermontane and Insular Coalfields of British Columbia also contain deposits of Cretaceous bituminous coal.

As of 2009, the countries with the greatest estimated ultimately recoverable resources of bituminous coal were the US, 161.6 Gt; India, 99.7 Gt; China, 78.4 Gt; Australia, 51.3 Gt; South Africa, 38.7 Gt; the UK, 26.8 Gt; Germany, 25.2 Gt; Colombia, 7.8 Gt; Indonesia, 5.6 Gt; and France, 4.4 Gt

As of 2018, total world production of bituminous coal (coking coal plus other bituminous coal) was 6.220 Gt. The leading producer is China, with India and the United States a distant second and third.

U.S. production of bituminous coal was 238 million short tons in 2020 and represented 44% of all U.S. coal production. Bituminous coal is mined in 18 states, but the five states of West Virginia, Pennsylvania, Illinois, Kentucky, and Indiana produce 74% of U.S. coal.

== Hazards and their mitigation ==
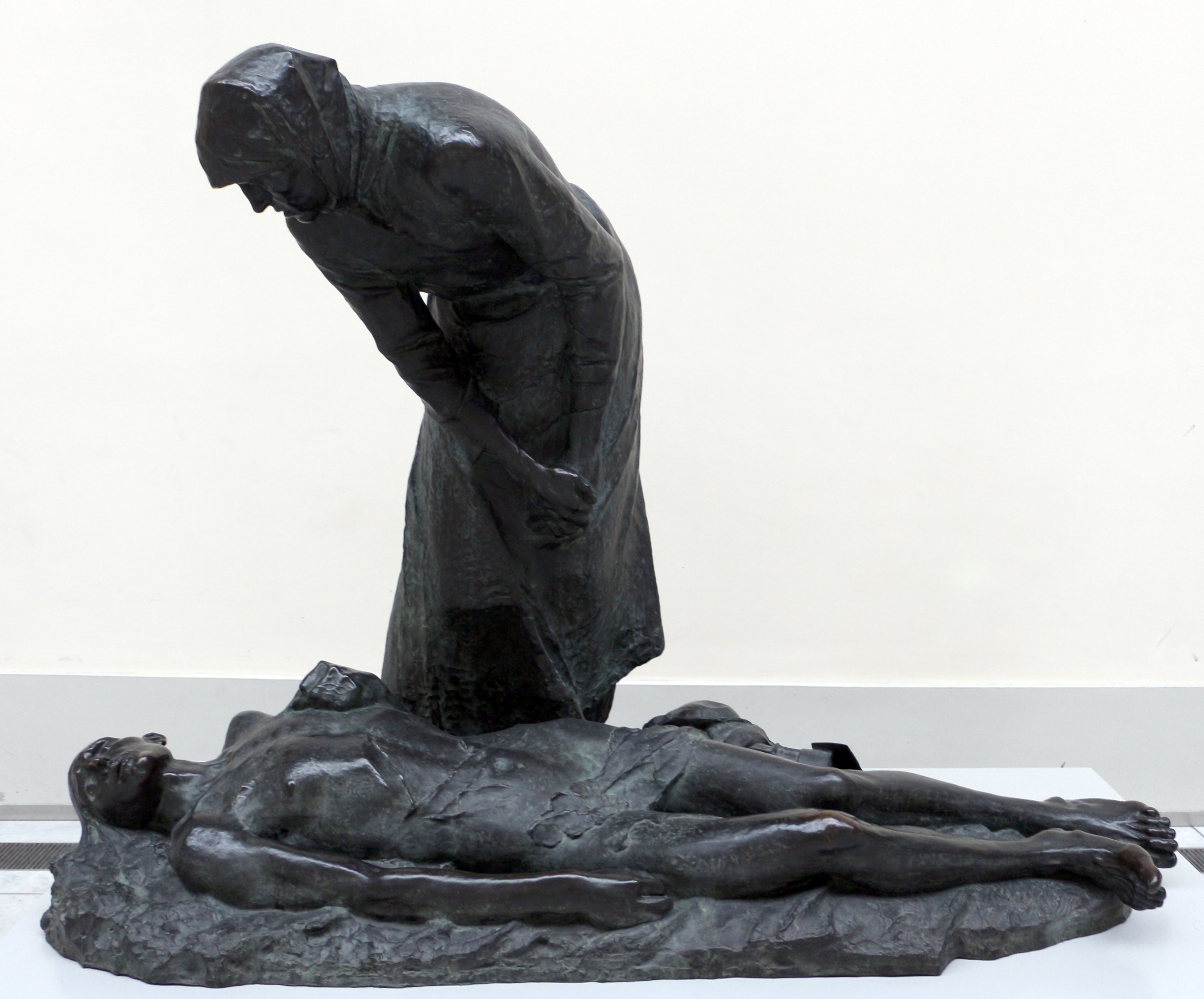
Firedamp (1889) by Constantin Meunier depicts the aftermath of a mining disaster

Maturation of bituminous coal at medium and low volatile subrank is accompanied by peak methane generation. This makes these bituminous coals "gassy" and precautions must be taken against methane explosions.

Bituminous coal was once extensively used for home heating in the US. However, bituminous coal is a relatively dirty fuel. The reduction in the use of bituminous coal between 1945 and 1960 is estimated to have saved at least 1,923 lives of all ages and 310 infant lives per winter month. Bituminous coal quality is improved with floatation methods, which increase the fraction of vitrinite to yield a cleaner-burning product.

The bioconversion of bituminous coal to methane is being actively researched as a clean coal technology.

== See also ==
- Coal analysis
- Georges Creek Valley
- Greenhouse gas emissions#Carbon dioxide (CO2)
- List of rock types
- Maceral
- Coking factory
