= Hilt's law =

Geological term

Hilt's law is a geological law that states the deeper the coal, the higher its rank (grade). The law holds true if the thermal gradient is entirely vertical, but metamorphism may cause lateral changes of rank, irrespective of depth. Increasing depth of burial results in a decrease in the oxygen content of the coals. The phenomenon was observed by professor Carl Hilt (1873).

== See also ==
- Coal assay

== Bibliography ==
- Coal Geology by Larry Thomas, , # ISBN 0-471-48531-4, # ISBN 978-0-471-48531-5
