= Sporinite =

Sporinite is a kind of exinite maceral found in coal formed from spores and pollen. It is a Type II kerogen.
