= Cutinite =

Natural mineral

Cutinite is a liptinite maceral formed from terrestrial plant cuticles, and often found in coal deposits. It is classified as a Type II kerogen.
