= Liptinite =

Finely-ground and macerated remains found in coal deposits

In coal geology, liptinite is the finely-ground and macerated remains found in coal deposits. It replaced the term exinite as one of the four categories of kerogen. Liptinites were originally formed by spores, pollen, dinoflagellate cysts, leaf cuticles, and plant resins and waxes.

Marie Stopes, a paleobotanist, introduced the term exinite in 1935 to describe the microscopic constituent of coal, rich in volatiles and relatively rich in hydrogen, that is represented by the exines of spores (their chemically resistant outer wall). C.A. Seyler in 1932, however, used the term with its present meaning, designating the following group of macerals: sporinite, cutinite, alginite (telalginite and lamalginite), resinite (fossil resins).

Macerals (from the verb macerare, the same Latin source as 'macerate') are to coal as minerals are to rock. The term was coined by M. C. Stopes in 1935, who wrote:

"The concept behind the word ‘macerals’ is that the complex of biological units represented by a forest tree which crashed into a watery swamp and there partly decomposed and was macerated in the process of coal formation, did not in that process become uniform throughout but still retains delimited regions optically differing under the microscope, which may or may not have different chemical formulae and properties. These organic units, composing the coal mass, I propose to call macerals, and they are the descriptive equivalent of the inorganic units composing most rock masses and universally called minerals."

The macerals grouped under the term exinite are not necessarily entirely composed of exines, but appear to have similar technical properties. However, little information is so far available on the technological behavior of pure exinite.

== Etymology ==
The term liptinite was introduced by Ammosov in 1956 and replaces the term exinite (a chemically and mechanically resistant substance present in the tough outer wall (exine) that preserves the structure of pollen grains). It derives from the ancient Greek term λειπτοσ (leiptos), meaning 'to leave behind', 'to remain', and 'what subsists' because it is robust and well preserved.

== See also ==
- Basin modelling
- Coal
- Exinite (ancient term for liptinite)
- Funginite
- Vitrinite
- Fossil fuels
- Geology
