= Neomariopteris =

Neomariopteris Temporal range: Permian and Triassic Lower 299–247.2 Ma

Scientific classification
- Kingdom: Plantae
- Division: Pteridophyta
- Genus: Neomariopteris P.K. Maithy

Species
- N. barakarensis; N. hughesii; N. lobifolia; N. polymorpha

Genus of plants

Neomariopteris is an extinct genus of plants dating from the Permian and Triassic Lower. Vascularized seedless plants (ferns) and reproduction by spores. They leaf type fronds. They lived in locales humid and swampy.

== Location ==
In Brazil, the fossil of species indefinite of the genus Neomariopteris, was located on outcrop Morro Papaléo in the city of Mariana Pimentel. They are in the geopark Paleorrota in Rio Bonito Formation and date from Sakmarian at Permian.
