= Maceral =

Dehydrogenated plant fragments found in coal or oil shale

A maceral is a component, organic in origin, of coal or oil shale. The term 'maceral' in reference to coal is analogous to the use of the term 'mineral' in reference to igneous or metamorphic rocks. Examples of macerals are inertinite, vitrinite, and liptinite.

== Etymology ==
In 1935, Marie Carmichael Stopes, a paleobotanist, coined the term maceral as follows:

I now propose the new word "Maceral" (from the Latin macerare, to macerate) as a distinctive and comprehensive word tallying with the word "mineral". Its derivation from the Latin word to "macerate" appears to make it peculiarly applicable to coal, for whatever the original nature of the coals, they now all consist of the macerated fragments of vegetation, accumulated under water.

== Inertinite ==
Inertinite is considered to be the equivalent of charcoal and degraded plant material. It is highly oxidised in nature and may be said to be burnt. A large portion of South Africa's coal reserves consists of inertinite.

== Vitrinite ==
Vitrinite is a shiny, glass-like material that is considered to be composed of cellular plant material such as roots, bark, plant stems and tree trunks. Vitrinite macerals, when observed under the microscope, show a boxlike, cellular structure, often with oblong voids and cavities that are likely the remains of plant stems. This has a high calorific value (24-28 MJ/kg) and a high volatile matter content (24-30%). It often occurs interbanded or interlaminated with inertinite and can be recognised as bright bands.

== Liptinite ==
Liptinite macerals are considered to be produced from decayed leaf matter, spores, pollen and algal matter. Resins and plant waxes can also be part of liptinite macerals. Liptinite macerals tend to retain their original plant form, i.e., they resemble plant fossils. These are hydrogen-rich and have the highest calorific values of all coal macerals.

Macerals of liptinite are sporinite, cutinite, resinite, alginite (telalginite and lamalginite), liptodetrinite, fluorinite, and bituminite.

== Nature of macerals ==
Macerals are considered to be dehydrogenated plant fragments. Evidence for this includes remnant pollen spores, fossilised leaves, remnant cellular structure and similar. In rare cases, maceral and fossilised pollen can be found in terrestrial sedimentary rocks.

Maceral maturity can be estimated by vitrinite reflectance. This gives information on the carbon, hydrogen and nitrogen composition of the coal, and determines the type of coal: lignite, bituminous coal, or anthracite.

Macerals found in kerogen source rocks are often observed under the microscope to determine the kerogen maturity of the sedimentary formations. This is a vital component of oil and gas exploration.

Macerals are observed under the petrographic microscope under reflected light. Coal fragments must be extremely highly polished down to less than half a micrometre before they can be observed under the microscope.

== See also ==
- Basin modelling
- Coalbed methane
- Funginite (maceral)
