= Kerogen =

Solid organic matter in sedimentary rocks

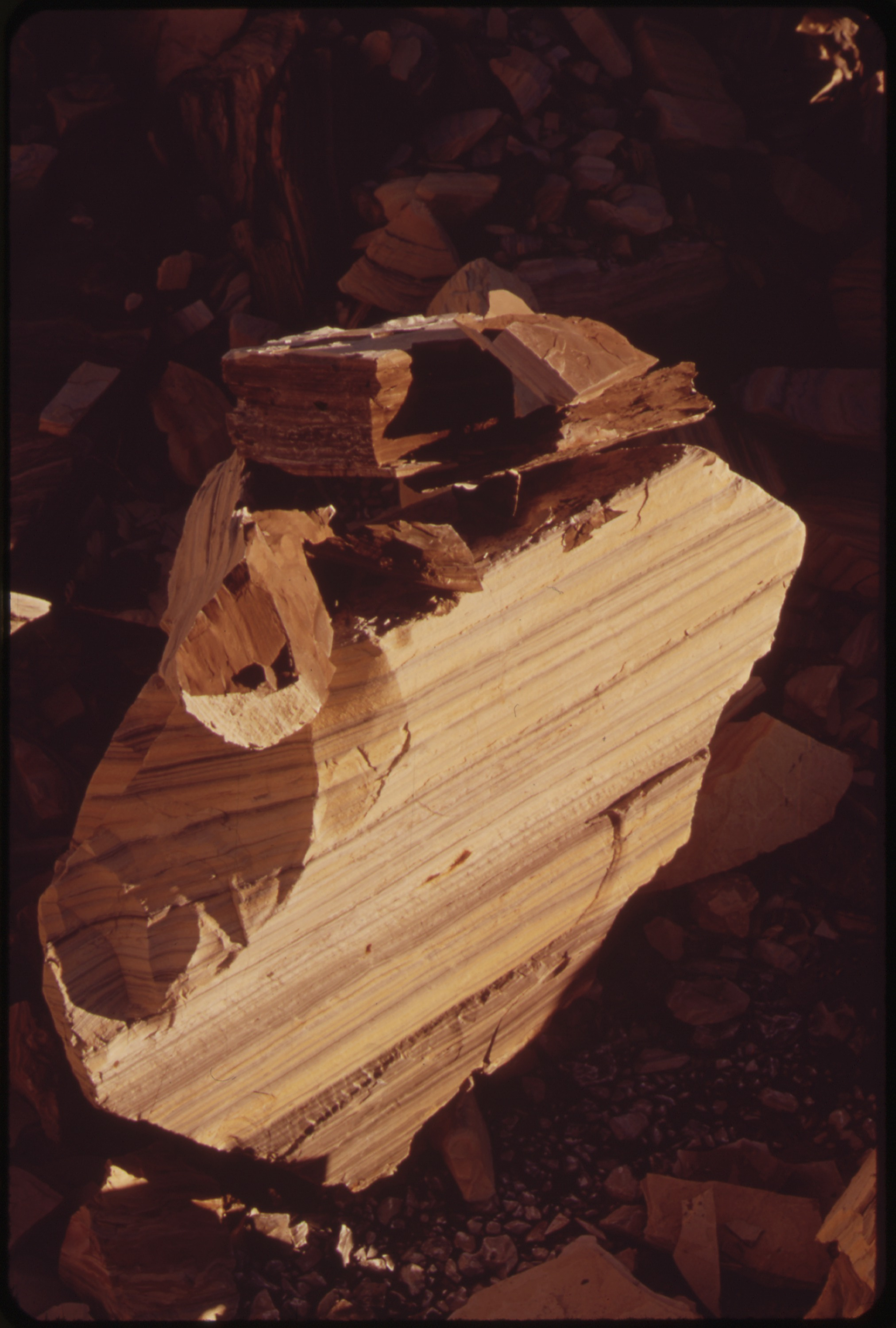
Kerogen can be found in oil shale

Kerogen is solid, insoluble organic matter in sedimentary rocks. It consists of a variety of organic materials, including dead plants, algae, and other microorganisms, that have been compressed and heated by geological processes. All the kerogen on earth is estimated to contain 10^{16} tons of carbon. This makes it the most abundant source of organic compounds on earth, exceeding the total organic content of living matter 10,000-fold.

The type of kerogen present in a particular rock formation depends on the type of organic material that was originally present. Kerogen can be classified by these origins: lacustrine (e.g., algal), marine (e.g., planktonic), and terrestrial (e.g., pollen and spores). The type of kerogen also depends on the degree of heat and pressure it has been subjected to, and the length of time the geological processes ran. This results in a complex mixture of organic compounds residing in sedimentary rocks which serve as the precursors for the formation of hydrocarbons such as oil and gas. In short, kerogen amounts to fossilized organic matter that has been buried and subjected to high temperatures and pressures over millions of years, resulting in various chemical reactions and transformations.

Kerogen is insoluble in normal organic solvents and it does not have a specific chemical formula. Upon heating, kerogen converts in part to liquid and gaseous hydrocarbons. Petroleum and natural gas form from kerogen. The name kerogen was introduced by the Scottish organic chemist Alexander Crum Brown in 1906, derived from the Greek words for wax and origin (Greek: κηρός 'wax' and -gen, γένεσις 'origin').

The increased production of hydrocarbons from shale has motivated a revival of research into the composition, structure, and properties of kerogen. Many studies have documented dramatic and systematic changes in kerogen composition across the range of thermal maturity relevant to the oil and gas industry. Analyses of kerogen are generally performed on samples prepared by acid demineralization with critical point drying, which isolates kerogen from the rock matrix without altering its chemical composition or microstructure.

== Formation ==
Kerogen is formed during sedimentary diagenesis from the degradation of living matter. The original organic matter can comprise lacustrine and marine algae and plankton and terrestrial higher-order plants. During diagenesis, large biopolymers from, e.g., proteins, lipids, and carbohydrates in the original organic matter, decompose partially or completely. This breakdown process can be viewed as the reverse of photosynthesis. These resulting units can then polycondense to form geopolymers. The formation of geopolymers in this way accounts for the large molecular weights and diverse chemical compositions associated with kerogen. The smallest units are the fulvic acids, the medium units are the humic acids, and the largest units are the humins. This polymerization usually happens alongside the formation and/or sedimentation of one or more mineral components resulting in a sedimentary rock like oil shale.

When kerogen is contemporaneously deposited with geologic material, subsequent sedimentation and progressive burial or overburden provide elevated pressures and temperatures owing to lithostatic and geothermal gradients in the Earth's crust. Resulting changes in the burial temperatures and pressures lead to further changes in kerogen composition, including the losses of hydrogen, oxygen, nitrogen, sulfur, and their associated functional groups, along with subsequent isomerization and aromatization. Such changes are indicative of the thermal maturity state of kerogen. Aromatization allows for molecular stacking in sheets, which in turn drives changes in physical characteristics of kerogen, such as increasing molecular density, vitrinite reflectance, and spore coloration (yellow to orange to brown to black with increasing depth/thermal maturity).

During the process of thermal maturation, kerogen breaks down in high-temperature pyrolysis reactions to form lower-molecular-weight products including bitumen, oil, and gas. The extent of thermal maturation controls the nature of the product, with lower thermal maturities yielding mainly bitumen/oil and higher thermal maturities yielding gas. These generated species are partially expelled from the kerogen-rich source rock and in some cases can charge into a reservoir rock.

Kerogen takes on additional importance in unconventional resources, particularly shale. In these formations, oil and gas are produced directly from the kerogen-rich source rock (i.e. the source rock is also the reservoir rock). Much of the porosity in these shales is found to be hosted within the kerogen, rather than between the mineral grains that occur in conventional reservoir rocks. Thus, kerogen controls much of the storage and transport of oil and gas in shale.

Another possible method of formation is that vanabin-containing organisms cleave the core out of chlorin-based compounds such as the magnesium in chlorophyll and replace it with their vanadium center in order to attach and harvest energy via light-harvesting complexes. It is theorized that the bacteria contained in worm castings, Rhodopseudomonas palustris, do this during its photoautotrophism mode of metabolism. Over time colonies of light harvesting bacteria solidify, forming kerogen .

== Composition ==
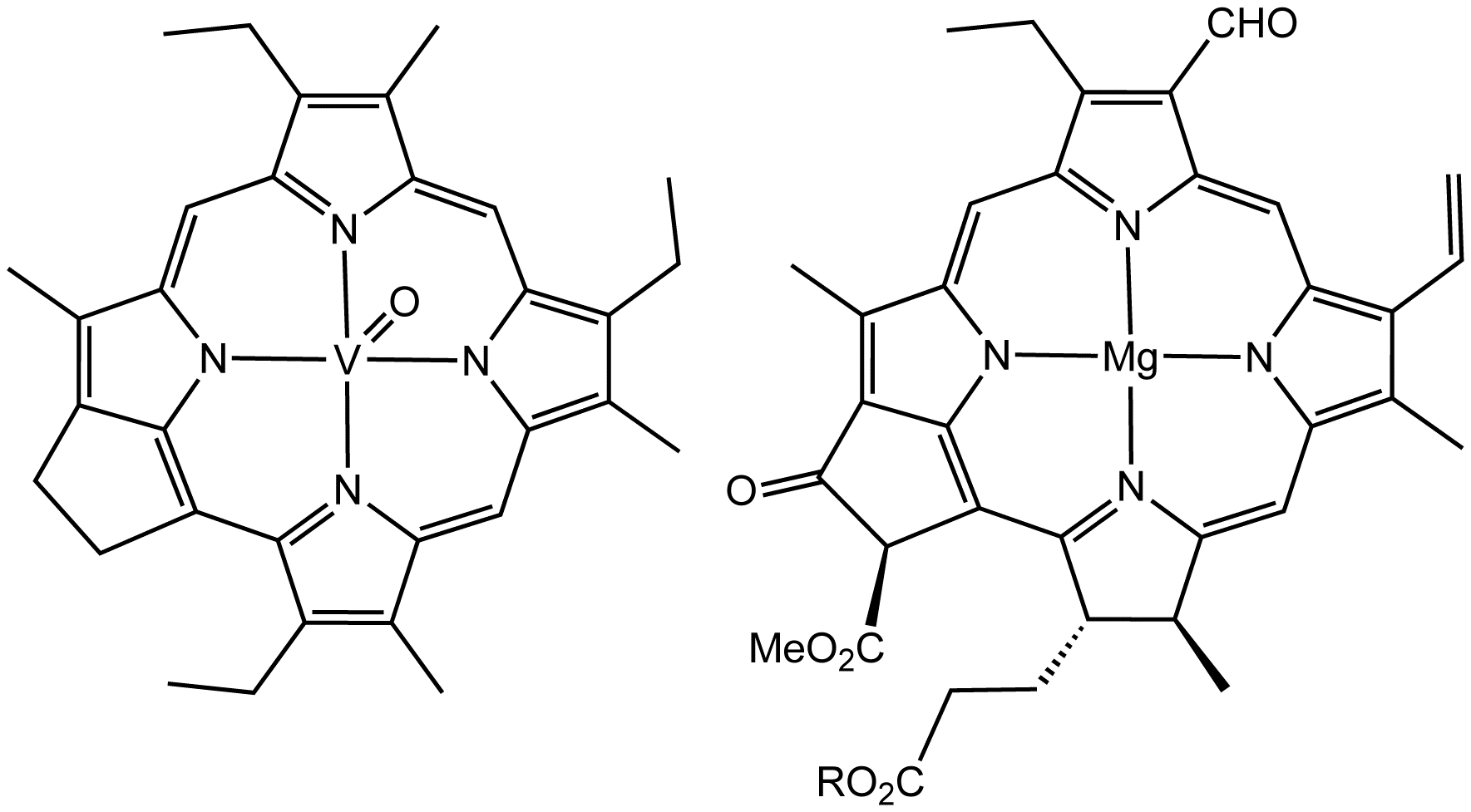
Structure of a vanadium porphyrin compound (left) extracted from petroleum by Alfred E. Treibs, father of organic geochemistry. The close structural similarity of this molecule and chlorophyll a (right) helped establish that petroleum was derived from plants.

Kerogen is a complex mixture of organic chemical compounds that make up the most abundant fraction of organic matter in sedimentary rocks. As kerogen is a mixture of organic materials, it is not defined by a single chemical formula. Its chemical composition varies substantially between and even within sedimentary formations. For example, kerogen from the Green River Formation oil shale deposit of western North America contains elements in the proportions carbon 215 : hydrogen 330 : oxygen 12 : nitrogen 5 : sulfur 1.

Kerogen is insoluble in normal organic solvents in part because of the high molecular weight of its component compounds. The soluble portion is known as bitumen. When heated to the right temperatures in the earth's crust, (oil window c. 50–150 °C, gas window c. 150–200 °C, both depending on how quickly the source rock is heated) some types of kerogen release crude oil or natural gas, collectively known as hydrocarbons (fossil fuels). When such kerogens are present in high concentration in rocks such as organic-rich mudrock shale, they form possible source rocks. Shales that are rich in kerogen but have not been heated to the temperatures required to generate hydrocarbons instead may form oil shale deposits.

The chemical composition of kerogen has been analyzed by several forms of solid state spectroscopy. These experiments typically measure the speciations (bonding environments) of different types of atoms in kerogen. One technique is ^{13}C NMR spectroscopy, which measures carbon speciation. NMR experiments have found that carbon in kerogen can range from almost entirely aliphatic (sp^{3} hybridized) to almost entirely aromatic (sp^{2} hybridized), with kerogens of higher thermal maturity typically having higher abundance of aromatic carbons. Another technique is Raman spectroscopy, which uses Raman scattering to identify specific vibrational modes and symmetries of molecular bonds. The first-order Raman spectra of kerogen comprises two principal peaks; a so-called G-band ("graphitic") attributed to in-plane vibrational modes of well-ordered sp^{2} carbon and a so-called D band ("disordered") from symmetric vibrational modes of sp^{2} carbon associated with lattice defects and discontinuities. The relative spectral position (Raman shift) and intensity of these carbon species is shown to correlate to thermal maturity, with kerogens of higher thermal maturity having higher abundance of graphitic/ordered aromatic carbons. Complementary and consistent results have been obtained with infrared (IR) spectroscopy, which show that kerogen has a higher fraction of aromatic carbons and shorter lengths of aliphatic chains at higher thermal maturities. These results can be explained by the preferential removal of aliphatic carbons by cracking reactions during pyrolysis, where the cracking typically occurs at weak C–C bonds beta to aromatic rings and results in the replacement of a long aliphatic chain with a methyl group. At higher maturities, when all labile aliphatic carbons have already been removed—in other words, when the kerogen has no remaining oil-generation potential—further increase in aromaticity can occur from the conversion of aliphatic bonds (such as alicyclic rings) to aromatic bonds.

IR spectroscopy is sensitive to carbon-oxygen bonds such as quinones, ketones, and esters, so the technique can also be used to investigate oxygen speciation. It is found that the oxygen content of kerogen decreases during thermal maturation (as has also been observed by elemental analysis), with relatively little observable change in oxygen speciation. Similarly, sulfur speciation can be investigated with X-ray absorption near edge structure spectroscopy (XANES), which is sensitive to sulfur-containing functional groups such as sulfides, thiophenes, and sulfoxides. Sulfur content in kerogen generally decreases with thermal maturity, and sulfur speciation includes a mix of sulfides and thiophenes at low thermal maturities and is further enriched in thiophenes at high maturities.

Overall, changes in kerogen composition with respect to heteroatom chemistry occur predominantly at low thermal maturities (bitumen and oil windows), while changes with respect to carbon chemistry occur predominantly at high thermal maturities (oil and gas windows).

== Microstructure ==
The microstructure of kerogen also evolves during thermal maturation, as has been inferred by scanning electron microscopy (SEM) imaging showing the presence of abundant internal pore networks within the lattice of thermally mature kerogen. Analysis by gas sorption demonstrated that the internal specific surface area of kerogen increases by an order of magnitude (~ 40 to 400 m^{2}/g) during thermal maturation. X-ray and neutron diffraction studies have examined the spacing between carbon atoms in kerogen, revealing during thermal maturation a shortening of carbon-carbon distances in covalently bonded carbons (related to the transition from primarily aliphatic to primarily aromatic bonding) but a lengthening of carbon-carbon distances in carbons at greater bond separations (related to the formation of kerogen-hosted porosity). This evolution is attributed to the formation of kerogen-hosted pores left behind as segments of the kerogen molecule are cracked off during thermal maturation.

== Physical properties ==
Changes in composition and microstructure result in changes to the properties of kerogen. For example, the skeletal density of kerogen increases from approximately 1.1 g/ml at low thermal maturity to 1.7 g/ml at high thermal maturity. This evolution is consistent with the change in carbon speciation from predominantly aliphatic (similar to wax, density < 1 g/ml) to predominantly aromatic (similar to graphite, density > 2 g/ml) with increasing thermal maturity.

== Spatial heterogeneity ==
Additional studies have explored the spatial heterogeneity of kerogen at small length scales. Individual particles of kerogen arising from different inputs are identified and assigned as different macerals. This variation in starting material may lead to variations in composition between different kerogen particles, leading to spatial heterogeneity in kerogen composition at the micron-length scale. Heterogeneity between kerogen particles may also arise from local variations in catalysis of pyrolysis reactions due to the nature of the minerals surrounding different particles. Measurements performed using infrared nanospectroscopy and correlated with organic petrography have analyzed the evolution of the chemical composition and mechanical properties of individual macerals of kerogen with thermal maturation at the nanoscale. These results indicate that all macerals decrease in oxygen content and increase in aromaticity (decrease in aliphalicity), yielding an overall increase in structural stability and mechanical stiffness. The extent to which different types of macerals experience these changes can vary greatly, however, ranging from relatively small to fairly significant.

== Types ==
Labile kerogen breaks down to generate principally liquid hydrocarbons (i.e., oil), refractory kerogen breaks down to generate principally gaseous hydrocarbons, and inert kerogen generates no hydrocarbons but forms graphite.

In organic petrography, the different components of kerogen can be identified by microscopic inspection and are classified as macerals. This classification was developed originally for coal (a sedimentary rock that is rich in organic matter of terrestrial origin) but is now applied to the study of other kerogen-rich sedimentary deposits.

The Van Krevelen diagram is one method of classifying kerogen by "types", where kerogens form distinct groups when the ratios of hydrogen to carbon and oxygen to carbon are compared.

=== Type I: algal/sapropelic ===
Type I kerogens are characterized by high initial hydrogen-to-carbon (H/C) ratios and low initial oxygen-to-carbon (O/C) ratios. This kerogen is rich in lipid-derived material and is commonly, but not always, from algal organic matter in lacustrine (freshwater) environments. On a mass basis, rocks containing type I kerogen yield the largest quantity of hydrocarbons upon pyrolysis. Hence, from the theoretical view, shales containing type I kerogen are the most promising deposits in terms of conventional oil retorting.

- Hydrogen:carbon atomic ratio > 1.25
- Oxygen:carbon atomic ratio < 0.15
- Derived principally from lacustrine algae, deposited in anoxic lake sediments and rarely in marine environments
- Composed of alginite, amorphous organic matter, cyanobacteria, freshwater algae, and lesser of land plant resins
- Formed mainly from protein and lipid precursors
- Has few cyclic or aromatic structures
- Shows great tendency to readily produce liquid hydrocarbons (oil) under heating

=== Type II: planktonic ===
Type II kerogens are characterized by intermediate initial H/C ratios and intermediate initial O/C ratios. Type II kerogen is principally derived from marine organic materials, which are deposited in reducing sedimentary environments. The sulfur content of type II kerogen is generally higher than in other kerogen types, and sulfur is found in substantial amounts in the associated bitumen. Although pyrolysis of type II kerogen yields less oil than type I, the amount yielded is still sufficient for type II-bearing sedimentary deposits to be petroleum source rocks.

- Hydrogen:carbon atomic ratio < 1.25
- Oxygen:carbon atomic ratio 0.03–0.18
- Derived principally from marine plankton and algae
- Produces a mixture oil and gas under heating

=== Type II-S: sulfurous ===
Similar to type II but with high sulfur content.

=== Type III: humic ===
Type III kerogens are characterized by low initial H/C ratios and high initial O/C ratios. Type III kerogens are derived from terrestrial plant matter, specifically from precursor compounds including cellulose, lignin (a non-carbohydrate polymer formed from phenyl-propane units that binds the strings of cellulose together); terpenes and phenols. Coal is an organic-rich sedimentary rock that is composed predominantly of this kerogen type. On a mass basis, type III kerogens generate the lowest oil yield of principal kerogen types.

- Hydrogen:carbon atomic ratio < 1
- Oxygen:carbon atomic ratio 0.03–0.3
- Has low hydrogen content because of abundant aromatic carbon structures
- Derived from terrestrial (land) plants
- Tends to produce gas under heating (recent research has shown that type III kerogens can actually produce oil under extreme conditions), albeit exceptions exist in the form of oil-prone type III kerogen in lower delta plains

=== Type IV: inert/residual ===
Type IV kerogen comprises mostly inert organic matter in the form of polycyclic aromatic hydrocarbons. They have no potential to produce hydrocarbons.

- Hydrogen:carbon atomic ratio < 0.5

== Kerogen cycle ==
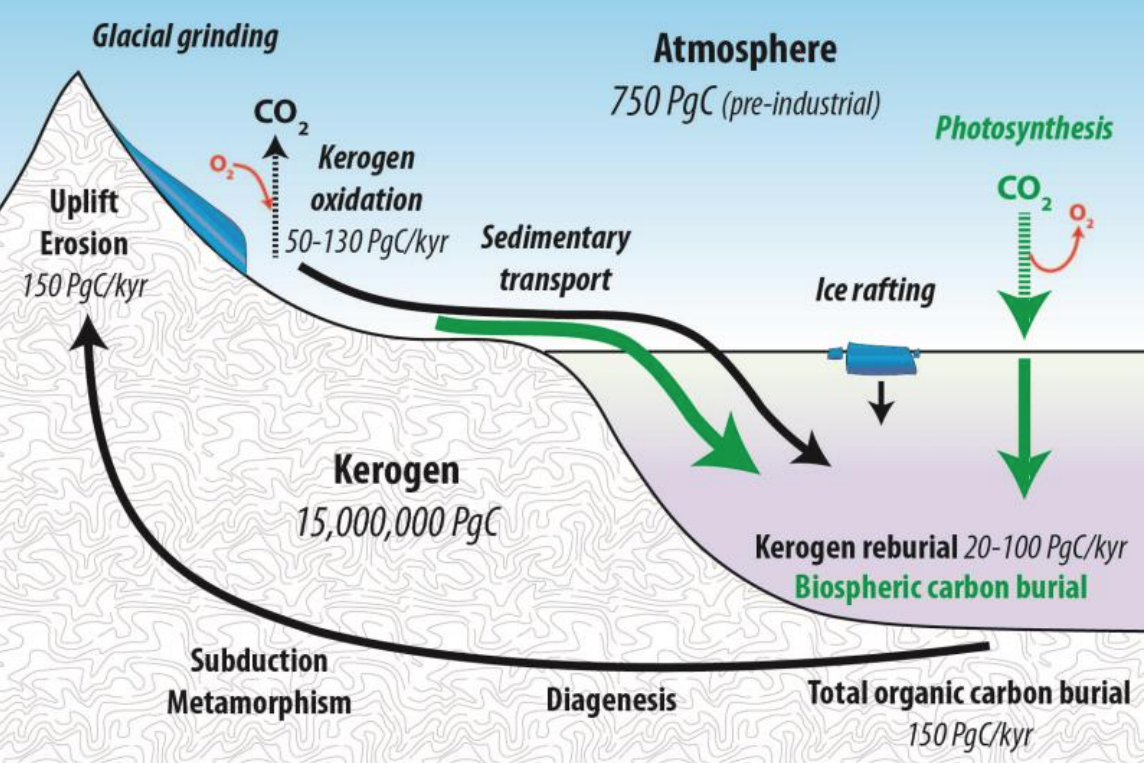
Kerogen cycle at the geological time scale. PgC: Petagram of carbon, 1 × E15 g = 1 × E9 × E6 g = 1 Gton of carbon. kyr = ky = ka = 1000 years.

The diagram on the right shows the organic carbon cycle with the flow of kerogen (black solid lines) and the flow of biospheric carbon (green solid lines), showing both the fixation of atmospheric CO_{2} by terrestrial and marine primary productivity. The combined flux of reworked kerogen and biospheric carbon into ocean sediments constitutes total organic carbon burial entering the endogenous kerogen pool.

== Extra-terrestrial ==
Carbonaceous chondrite meteorites contain kerogen-like components. Such material is thought to have formed the terrestrial planets. Kerogenous materials have been detected also in interstellar clouds and dust around stars.

The Curiosity rover has detected organic deposits similar to kerogen in mudstone samples in Gale Crater on Mars using a revised drilling technique. The presence of benzene and propane also indicates the possible presence of kerogen-like materials, from which hydrocarbons are derived.

== See also ==
- Asphaltene – Heavy organic molecular substances that are found in crude oil
- Oil shale geology – Branch of geology
- Petroleum geology – Field in geology
- Tholin – Class of molecules formed by ultraviolet irradiation of organic compounds

== Bibliography ==
- Helgeson, Harold C.; Richard, Laurent; McKenzie, William F.; Norton, Denis L.; Schmitt, Alexandra (2009). "A chemical and thermodynamic model of oil generation in hydrocarbon source rocks". Geochimica et Cosmochimica Acta. 73 (3): 594–695. Bibcode:2009GeCoA..73..594H. doi:10.1016/j.gca.2008.03.004.
- Marakushev, Sergey A.; Belonogova, Olga V. (2021). "Неорганическое происхождение углеродного вещества «нефтематеринских» пород" [An inorganic origin of the "oil-source" rocks carbon substance]. Георесурсы [Georesources]. 23 (3): 164–176. doi:10.18599/grs.2021.3.19.
