= Alginite =

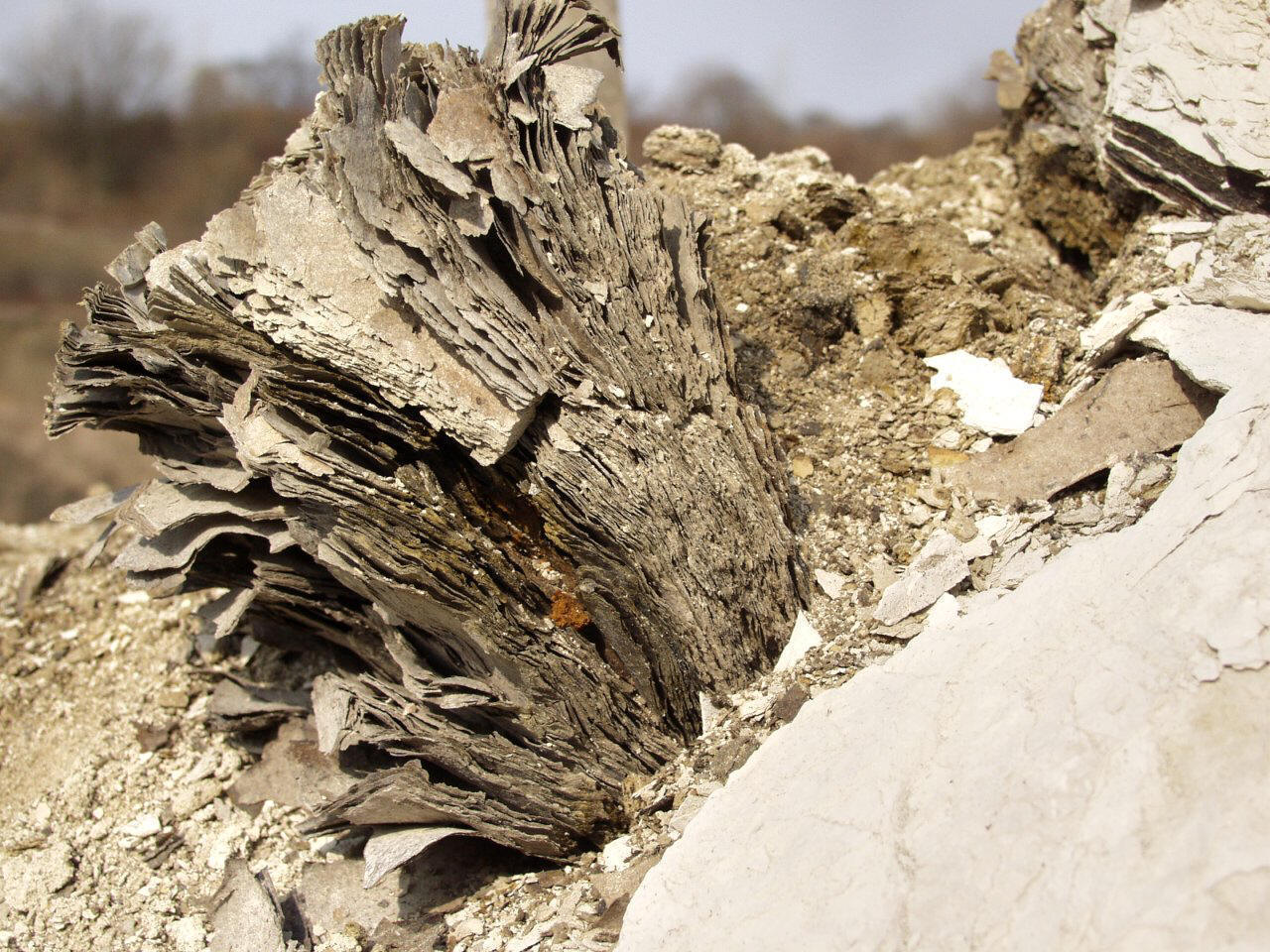
Alginite

Alginite is a component of some types of kerogen alongside amorphous organic matter. Alginite consists of organic-walled marine microfossils, distinct from inorganic (silica)-walled microfossils that comprise diatomaceous earth.

Alginite is a complex soil aggregate of algae based biomass fossil, clay, volcanic ash and calcium carbonate. This material contains a complete spectrum of minerals, biological, macro- and micro-organisms helping to turn lands fertile again in regions where soil has been severely degraded in the past.

At least two forms of alginite are distinguishable, "alginite A" (telalginite) and "alginite B" (lamalginite). The "A" form contains morphologically distinguishable microfossils while the "B" form is more amorphous and film-like.
