= Vitrinite =

Organic component of coal used to assess the thermal maturity of sedimentary rocks

Vitrinite is one of the primary components of coals and most sedimentary kerogens. Vitrinite is a type of maceral, meaning organic components of coal analogous to the "minerals" of rocks. Vitrinite has a shiny appearance resembling glass (vitreous). It is derived from the cell-wall material or woody tissue of the plants from which coal was formed. Chemically, it is composed of polymers, cellulose and lignin and forms diagenetically by the thermal alteration .

Vitrinite is common in sedimentary rocks that are rich in organic matter, such as shales and marls with a terrigenous origin, or some terrigenous content. Conversely, carbonates, evaporites and well-sorted sandstones have very low vitrinite contents. Vitrinite is absent in pre-Silurian rocks because land plants had not yet evolved.

Vitrinite reflectance (Ro%) is an important geochemical parameter used to assess and evaluate the thermal maturity of sedimentary rocks, particularly those rich in organic matter, such as shales. Ro% can be determined under oil immersion using a reflected light microscope in which the amount of light reflected is measured by a sensor, such as a photomultiplier tube, and is expressed as percent reflected from polished vitrinite. Vitrinite reflectance increases with greater burial depth and thermal exposure, roughly doubling every 10 °C, making it a reliable indicator of the maximum temperature a rock has experienced during its geological history. Ro% can indicate if and what types of hydrocarbon(s) could be formed but it cannot determine when the generation process started or how much there is.

== Vitrinite reflectance ==
The study of vitrinite reflectance (or VR) is a key method for identifying the maximum temperature history of sediments in sedimentary basins. The reflectance of vitrinite was first studied by coal explorationists seeking to diagnose the thermal maturity, or rank, of coal beds. More recently, its utility as a tool for the study of sedimentary organic matter metamorphism from kerogens to hydrocarbons has been increasingly exploited. The key attraction of vitrinite reflectance in this context is its sensitivity to temperature ranges that largely correspond to those of hydrocarbon generation (i.e. 60 to 120 °C). This means that, with a suitable calibration, vitrinite reflectance can be used as an indicator of maturity in hydrocarbon source rocks. Generally, the onset of oil generation is correlated with a reflectance of 0.5–0.6% and the termination of oil generation with a reflectance of 0.85–1.1%. The onset of gas generation ('gas window') is typically associated with values of 1.0–1.3% and terminates around 3.0%. However, these generation windows vary between source rocks with different kerogen types (vitrinite is typically abundant in 'Type III' kerogen-rich source rocks), so a conversion to 'transformation ratio' (TR) can be applied to create a kerogen-specific maturity parameter. The vitrinite reflectance value represents the highest temperature the vitrinite maceral (and its source rock) has experienced and is routinely used in 1D burial modelling to identify geological unconformities in sedimentary sections.

Typically, vitrinite reflectance data is presented in units of %Ro, the measured percentage of reflected light from a sample which is immersed in oil (%Ro = % reflectance in oil).

The lack of vitrinite macerals in marine shales with little terrestrial input often requires alternative maturity parameters instead of vitrinite reflectance such as heating the sample to determine the hydrocarbons present (Rock-Eval T_{max} in industry jargon), biomarker equivalences and other maceral reflectance parameters (e.g. liptinite reflectance).

== See also ==
- Basin modelling
- Coal
- Funginite
- Liptinite, formerly known as exinite
- Fossil fuels
- Geology
